= Psalm 8 =

Hebrew Bible psalm

- "O LORD, our Lord, how excellent is thy name in all the earth!"
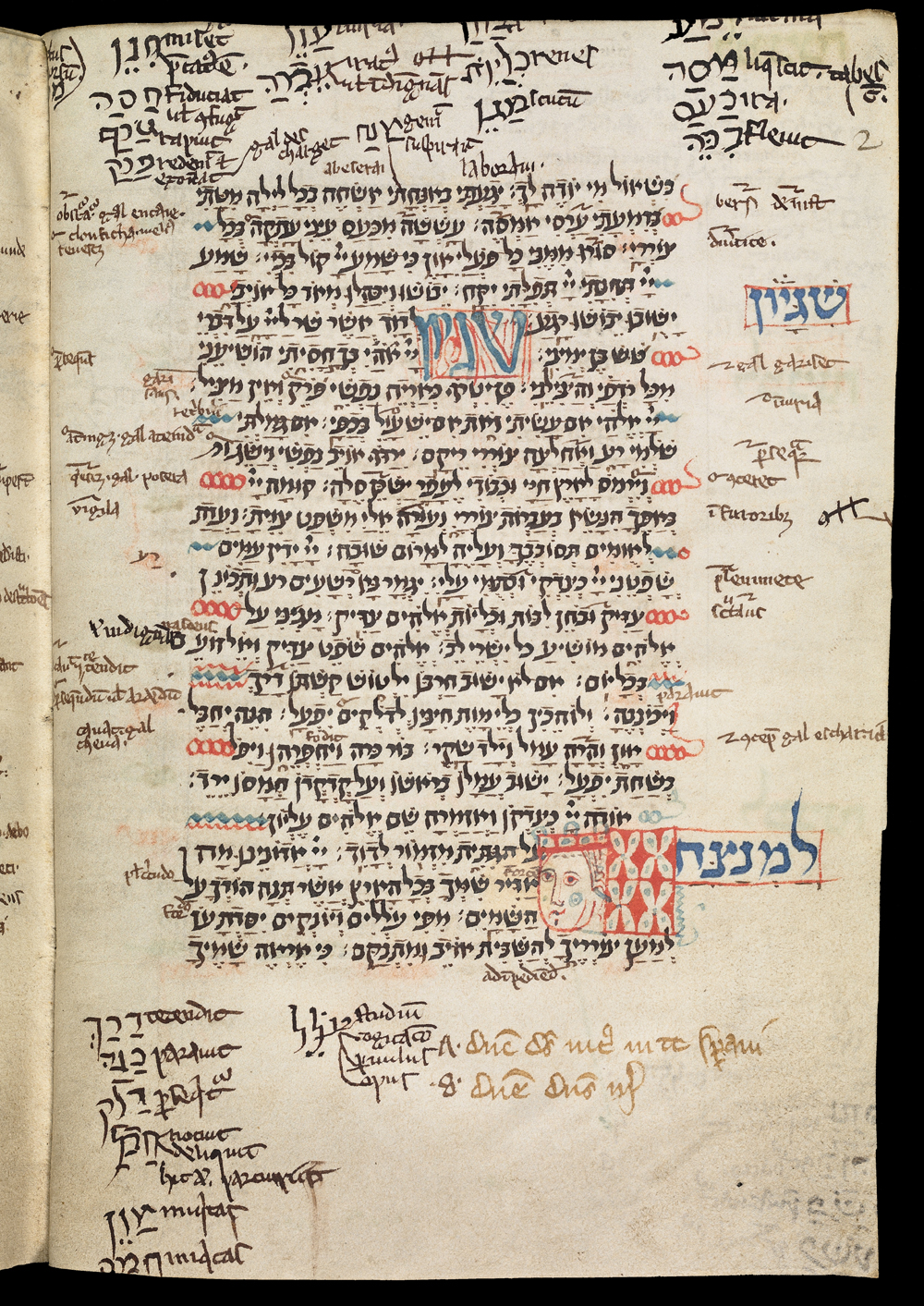
- Psalm 8 in a Hebrew Psalter from the 13th century, with annotations
- Other name: "Domine Dominus noster"
- Text: by David
- Language: Hebrew (original)

Psalm 8
- ← Psalm 7 Psalm 9 →
- Book: Book of Psalms
- Hebrew Bible part: Ketuvim
- Order in the Hebrew part: 1
- Category: Sifrei Emet
- Christian Bible part: Old Testament
- Order in the Christian part: 19

Psalm 8 is the eighth psalm of the Hebrew Bible's Book of Psalms, beginning and ending in English in the King James Version (KJV): "O LORD, our Lord, how excellent is thy name in all the earth!". In Latin, it is known as "Domine Dominus noster". Its authorship is traditionally assigned to King David. Like Psalms 81 and 84, this psalm opens with a direction to the chief musician to perform upon the gittith, which either refers to a musical instrument, a style of performance, or alludes to persons and places in biblical history.

Commentator Cyril Rodd describes this as a "well-known and greatly loved psalm ... usually classified as a hymn". It forms a regular part of Jewish, Catholic, Lutheran, Anglican and other Protestant liturgies. It has often been set to music, and has inspired hymns such as "For the Beauty of the Earth" and "How Great Thou Art".

== Background and themes ==
Like Psalms 81 and 84, Psalm 8 opens with a direction to the chief musician to perform upon the gittit (Hebrew: גתית). The New King James Version calls it "the instrument of Gath". The Hebrew root gat (גת) refers to a winepress, indicating that these are joyful psalms. The word may also refer to the biblical city of Gath, where a similar song was sung or a musical instrument was created; or to a song of Obed-Edom the Gittite, in whose home the Ark of the Covenant rested for three months (II Samuel 6:11); or to a song over Goliath, who was from Gath.

Charles Spurgeon called this psalm "the song of the Astronomer", as gazing at the heavens (verse 3 in KJV) inspires the psalmist to meditate on God's creation and man's place in it. Spurgeon further interpreted the "babes and sucklings" to whom the Lord gives strength (verse 2 in KJV) as referring variously to man, David, Jesus, the apostles, and all "who fight under Christ's banner".

According to the Midrash Tehillim, verses 5 through 10 in the Hebrew contain questions that the angels asked God as God was creating the world, referring to the righteous men of Israel:

- "What is man that You are mindful of him"—referring to Abraham (see Genesis 19:29);
- "and the son of man that You remember him"—referring to Abraham's son Isaac, who was born as a result of God remembering Sarah (Genesis 21:1);
- "Yet You made him less only than God"—referring to Jacob, who was able to produce streaked, speckled, and spotted flocks (Genesis 30:39);
- "And have crowned him with glory and honor"—referring to Moses, whose face shone (Exodus 34:29);
- "You give him dominion over the work of Your hands"—referring to Joshua, who made the sun and moon stand still (Joshua 10:12-13);
- "You put all things beneath his feet"—referring to David, whose enemies fell before him (II Samuel 22:43);
- "Sheep and oxen, all of them"—referring to Solomon, who understood the language of beasts (I Kings 5:13);
- "and the beasts of the field"—referring to either Samson or Daniel;
- "the birds of the sky"—referring to Elijah, who navigates the world like a bird, and who also received food from the ravens (I Kings 17:6);
- "and the fish of the seas"—referring to Jonah, who dwelled in the belly of a fish (Jonah 2:1).
- "he traverses the ways of the seas"—referring to the Israelites who walked through the sea on dry land (Exodus 15:19).
- "O Lord, our Lord how glorious is Your name in all the earth"—thus the angels concluded, "Do what pleases You. Your glory is to sojourn with Your people and with Your children".

Psalm 8 manifests a prevailing theme of man in creation, serving as a precursor to a sequential arrangement of acrostic Psalms 9 and 10. O Palmer Robertson, in his work "The Flow of the Psalms", identifies three analogous instances of creation-themed acrostics in Book 1 of Psalms, specifically:

- Creation Psalm 8 preceding acrostic Psalm 9 and 10
- Creation Psalm 24 preceding acrostic Psalm 25
- Creation Psalm 33 preceding acrostic Psalm 34.

== Text ==
The following table shows the Hebrew text of the Psalm with vowels, alongside the Koine Greek text in the Septuagint and the English translation from the King James Version. Note that the meaning can slightly differ between these versions, as the Septuagint and the Masoretic Text come from different textual traditions. (Note: A 1917 translation directly from Hebrew to English by the Jewish Publication Society can be found here or here, and an 1844 translation directly from the Septuagint by L. C. L. Brenton can be found here. Both translations are in the public domain.)

| # | Hebrew | English | Greek |
|---|---|---|---|
| (Note: In the Jewish verse numbering, the ascription of this psalm is verse 1, and the rest of the psalm begins from verse 2. However, the Christian verse numbering does not count the ascription as a separate verse.) | לַמְנַצֵּ֥חַ עַֽל־הַגִּתִּ֗ית מִזְמ֥וֹר לְדָוִֽד׃ | (To the chief Musician upon Gittith, A Psalm of David.) | Εἰς τὸ τέλος, ὑπὲρ τῶν ληνῶν· ψαλμὸς τῷ Δαυΐδ. - |
| 1 | יְהֹוָ֤ה אֲדֹנֵ֗ינוּ מָֽה־אַדִּ֣יר שִׁ֭מְךָ בְּכׇל־הָאָ֑רֶץ אֲשֶׁ֥ר תְּנָ֥ה ה֝וֹדְךָ֗ עַל־הַשָּׁמָֽיִם׃ | O LORD, our Lord, how excellent is thy name in all the earth! who hast set thy glory above the heavens. | ΚΥΡΙΕ ὁ Κύριος ἡμῶν, ὡς θαυμαστὸν τὸ ὄνομά σου ἐν πάσῃ τῇ γῇ· ὅτι ἐπήρθη ἡ μεγαλοπρέπειά σου ὑπεράνω τῶν οὐρανῶν. |
| 2 | מִפִּ֤י עוֹלְלִ֨ים ׀ וְֽיֹנְקִים֮ יִסַּ֢דְתָּ֫ עֹ֥ז לְמַ֥עַן צוֹרְרֶ֑יךָ לְהַשְׁבִּ֥ית א֝וֹיֵ֗ב וּמִתְנַקֵּֽם׃ | Out of the mouth of babes and sucklings hast thou ordained strength because of thine enemies, that thou mightest still the enemy and the avenger. | ἐκ στόματος νηπίων καὶ θηλαζόντων κατηρτίσω αἶνον ἕνεκα τῶν ἐχθρῶν σου τοῦ καταλῦσαι ἐχθρὸν καὶ ἐκδικητήν. |
| 3 | כִּֽי־אֶרְאֶ֣ה שָׁ֭מֶיךָ מַעֲשֵׂ֣ה אֶצְבְּעֹתֶ֑יךָ יָרֵ֥חַ וְ֝כוֹכָבִ֗ים אֲשֶׁ֣ר כּוֹנָֽנְתָּה׃ | When I consider thy heavens, the work of thy fingers, the moon and the stars, which thou hast ordained; | ὅτι ὄψομαι τοὺς οὐρανούς, ἔργα τῶν δακτύλων σου, σελήνην καὶ ἀστέρας, ἃ σὺ ἐθεμελίωσας· |
| 4 | מָה־אֱנ֥וֹשׁ כִּֽי־תִזְכְּרֶ֑נּוּ וּבֶן־אָ֝דָ֗ם כִּ֣י תִפְקְדֶֽנּוּ׃ | What is man, that thou art mindful of him? and the son of man, that thou visitest him? | τί ἐστιν ἄνθρωπος, ὅτι μιμνῄσκῃ αὐτοῦ; ἢ υἱὸς ἀνθρώπου, ὅτι ἐπισκέπτῃ αὐτόν; |
| 5 | וַתְּחַסְּרֵ֣הוּ מְּ֭עַט מֵאֱלֹהִ֑ים וְכָב֖וֹד וְהָדָ֣ר תְּעַטְּרֵֽהוּ׃ | For thou hast made him a little lower than the angels, and hast crowned him with glory and honour. | ἠλάττωσας αὐτὸν βραχύ τι παρ᾿ ἀγγέλους, δόξῃ καὶ τιμῇ ἐστεφάνωσας αὐτόν, |
| 6 | תַּ֭מְשִׁילֵהוּ בְּמַעֲשֵׂ֣י יָדֶ֑יךָ כֹּ֝֗ל שַׁ֣תָּה תַֽחַת־רַגְלָֽיו׃ | Thou madest him to have dominion over the works of thy hands; thou hast put all things under his feet: | καὶ κατέστησας αὐτὸν ἐπὶ τὰ ἔργα τῶν χειρῶν σου· πάντα ὑπέταξας ὑποκάτω τῶν ποδῶν αὐτοῦ, |
| 7 | צֹנֶ֣ה וַאֲלָפִ֣ים כֻּלָּ֑ם וְ֝גַ֗ם בַּהֲמ֥וֹת שָׂדָֽי׃ | All sheep and oxen, yea, and the beasts of the field; | πρόβατα, καὶ βόας ἁπάσας, ἔτι δὲ καὶ τὰ κτήνη τοῦ πεδίου, |
| 8 | צִפּ֣וֹר שָׁ֭מַיִם וּדְגֵ֣י הַיָּ֑ם עֹ֝בֵ֗ר אׇרְח֥וֹת יַמִּֽים׃ | The fowl of the air, and the fish of the sea, and whatsoever passeth through the paths of the seas. | τὰ πετεινὰ τοῦ οὐρανοῦ καὶ τοὺς ἰχθύας τῆς θαλάσσης, τὰ διαπορευόμενα τρίβους θαλασσῶν. |
| 9 | יְהֹוָ֥ה אֲדֹנֵ֑ינוּ מָה־אַדִּ֥יר שִׁ֝מְךָ֗ בְּכׇל־הָאָֽרֶץ׃ | O LORD our Lord, how excellent is thy name in all the earth! | Κύριε ὁ Κύριος ἡμῶν, ὡς θαυμαστὸν τὸ ὄνομά σου ἐν πάσῃ τῇ γῇ! |

== Uses ==
=== Judaism ===
Psalm 8 is said during Yom Kippur Katan. In the Gra siddur, Psalm 8 is the Song of the Day for Simchat Torah in the Diaspora. In the Siddur Avodas Yisrael, this psalm is said after Aleinu during the weekday evening prayer.

The first half of verse 2 (in the Hebrew) is recited by Ashkenazim during the Kedushah of Mussaf on Jewish holidays. This verse also appears in the Hoshanot on Sukkot.

Verse 10 (in the Hebrew) appears as the corresponding verse for the second mention of the name "Adonai" in the Priestly Blessing.

=== Christianity ===
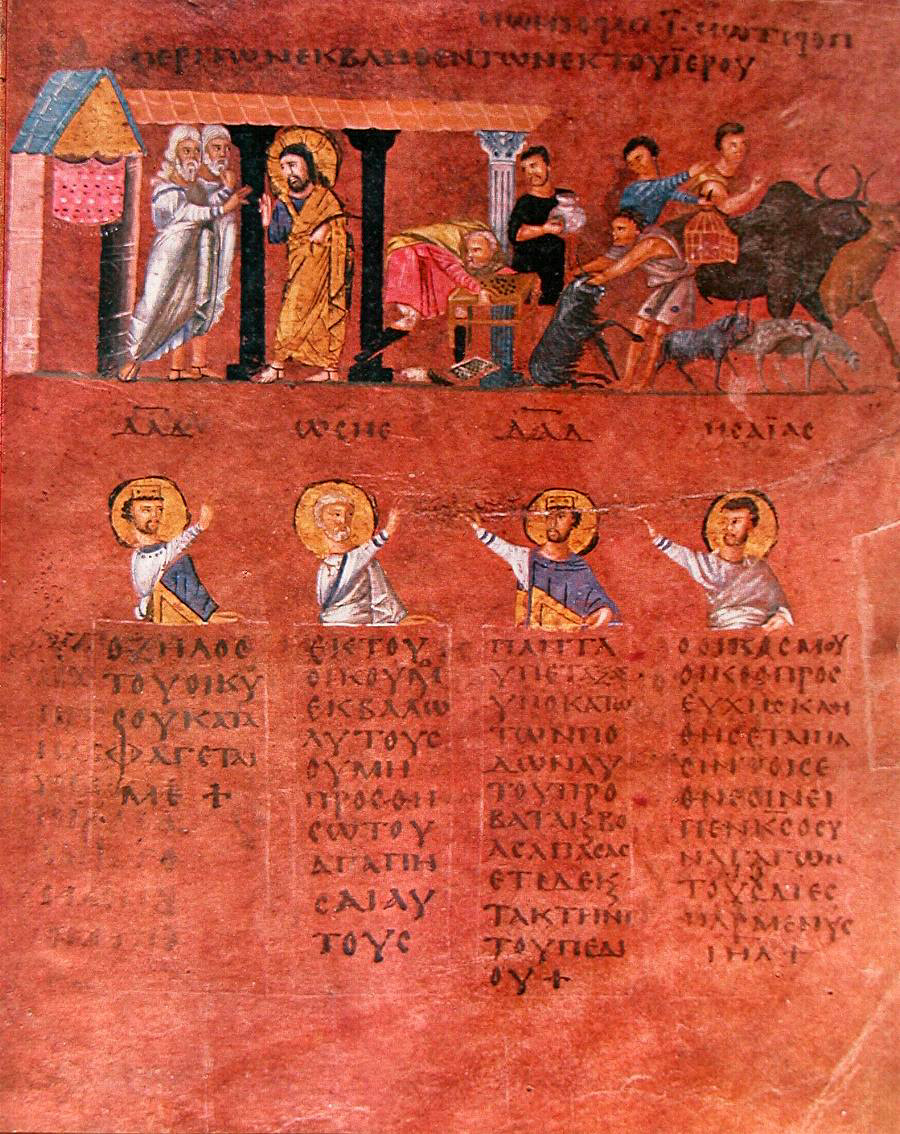
The cleansing of the temple, from the Rossano Gospels, 6th century. The verses cited below are Psalm 69:9, Hosea 9:15, Psalm 8:6–7, and Isaiah 56:7–8

==== New Testament ====
Some verses of Psalm 8 are referenced in the New Testament:

- Verse 2 is quoted by Jesus in Matthew 21:16 in reference to children praising him in the temple.
- Verses 4-6 are quoted in Hebrews 2:6–8 in reference to Jesus' incarnation.
- Verse 6 is quoted in 1 Corinthians 15:27 and Ephesians 1:22.

==== Catholic Church ====
According to the Rule of Saint Benedict, Psalm 8 is to be sung or recited by monks and nuns on Tuesday at the office of prime.

In the Roman Rite the psalm is recited twice a month as part of the Liturgy of the Hours, at Lauds on Saturday of weeks two and four. Additionally, it is also frequently used as the responsorial psalm at Mass: on Trinity Sunday, in the Easter Octave, on the first Tuesday of Ordinary Time, the 5th Tuesday of Ordinary Time, and on the 28th Saturday in Ordinary Time.

Pope Paul VI cited this psalm in his message on the Apollo 11 goodwill disk.

=== Coptic Orthodox Church ===
In the Agpeya, the Coptic Church's book of hours, this psalm is prayed in the office of Prime. It is also in the prayer of the Veil, which is generally prayed only by monks.

==== Book of Common Prayer ====
In the Church of England's Book of Common Prayer, Psalm 8 is appointed to be read on the evening of the first day of the month, as well as at Mattins on Ascension Day.

== Musical settings ==
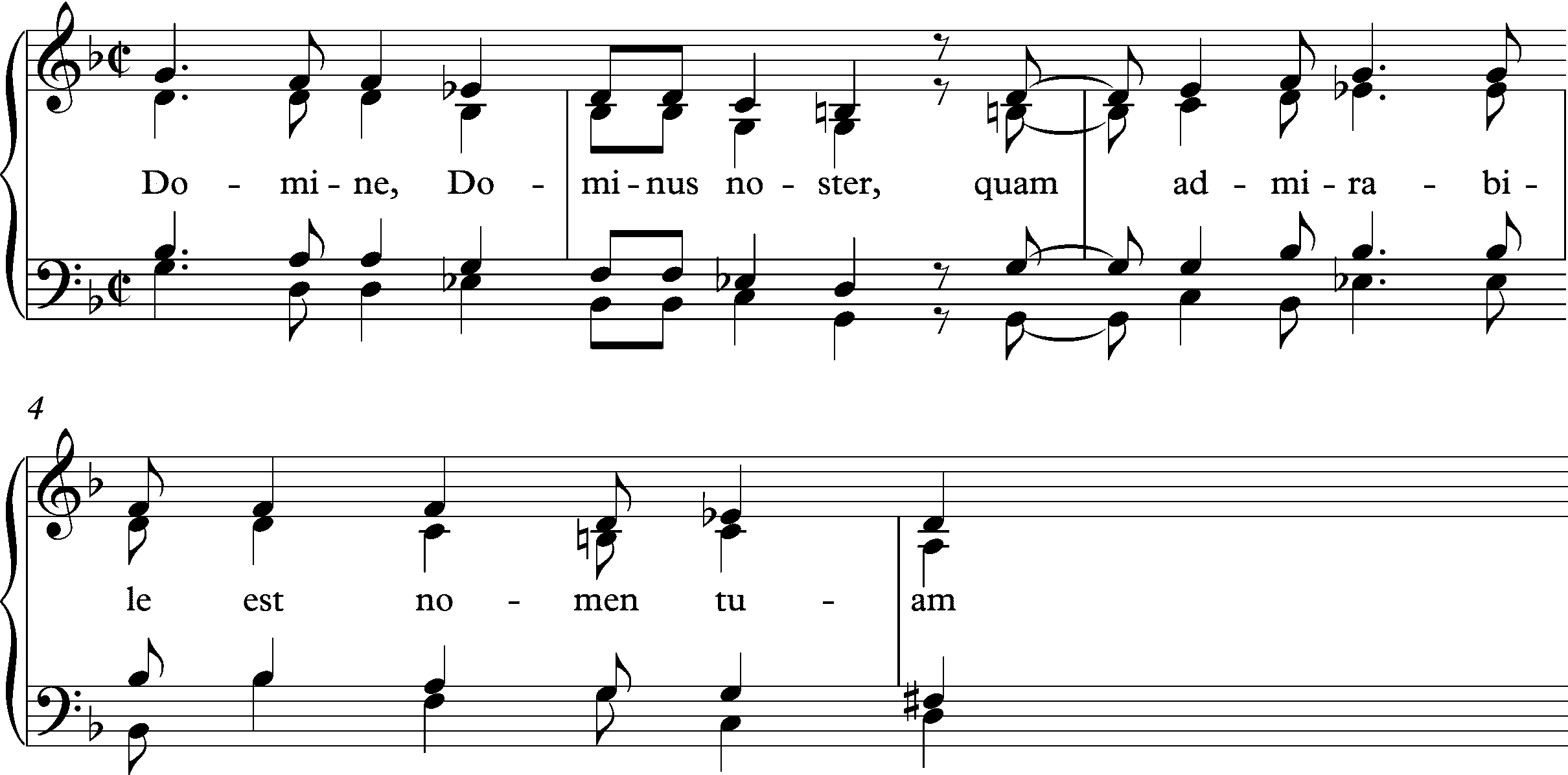
Giovanni Gabrieli, "Domine, Dominus noster"

Psalm 8 inspired hymn lyrics such as Folliott Sandford Pierpoint's "For the Beauty of the Earth" which first appeared in 1864 and "How Great Thou Art", based on a Swedish poem written by Carl Boberg in 1885.

Heinrich Schütz wrote a setting of a paraphrase in German, "Mit Dank wir sollen loben", SWV 104, for the Becker Psalter, published first in 1628.Michel Richard Delalande, composer of King Louis XIV, wrote an extended Latin motet setting this psalm, which was performed at the Royal Chapel of Versailles for royal offices. Marc-Antoine Charpentier compose around 1670s one "Domine Deus noster" for 3 voices, 2 treble instruments, and continuo, H.163.

Gospel singer Richard Smallwood set a version to music in 1990. In 2019, Seth Pinnock & A New Thing recorded a song entitled Psalms 8 which is featured as the first track on the Album: "Seth Pinnock & A New Thing Live".

== Literary references ==
The question "What is man?" from Psalm 8 may have inspired the reflection "What a piece of work is a man" in Shakespeare's Hamlet. Peter Moore contends that Shakespeare was inspired by a paraphrase of Psalm 8 composed by Henry Howard, Earl of Surrey, as he awaited execution in the Tower of London in late 1546 or early 1547. The question also appears as the title of Mark Twain's essay What Is Man?, published anonymously in 1906. The title of a 1974 science fiction short story by American writer Isaac Asimov, ". . . That Thou Art Mindful of Him", is also taken from Psalm 8.

== Historical uses ==
During his return to Earth from the first human landing on the Moon, astronaut Buzz Aldrin recited verses 4–5. Pope Paul VI quote from Psalm 8 in the Apollo 11 goodwill messages.

== Illuminated manuscripts ==
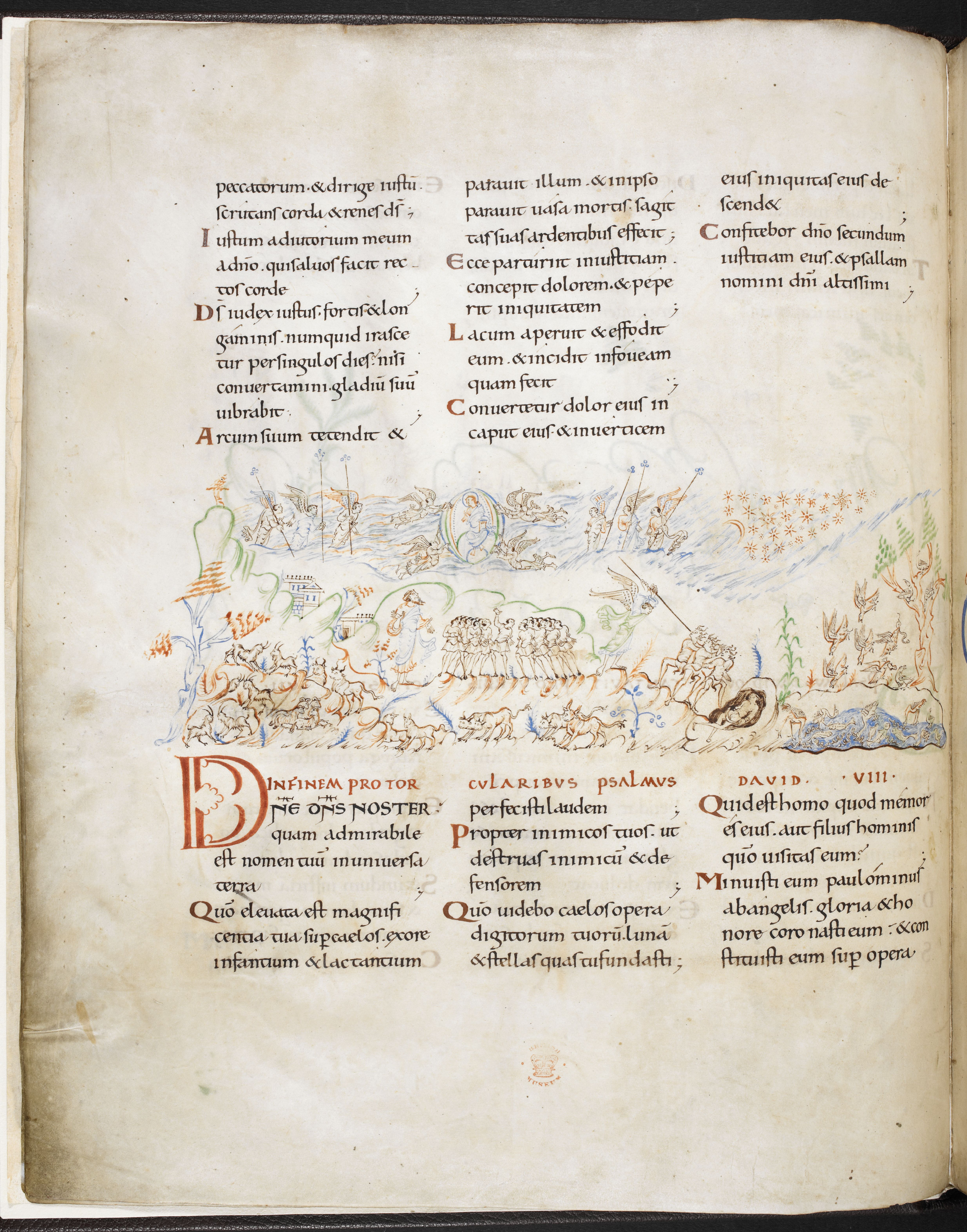
In Harley Psalter

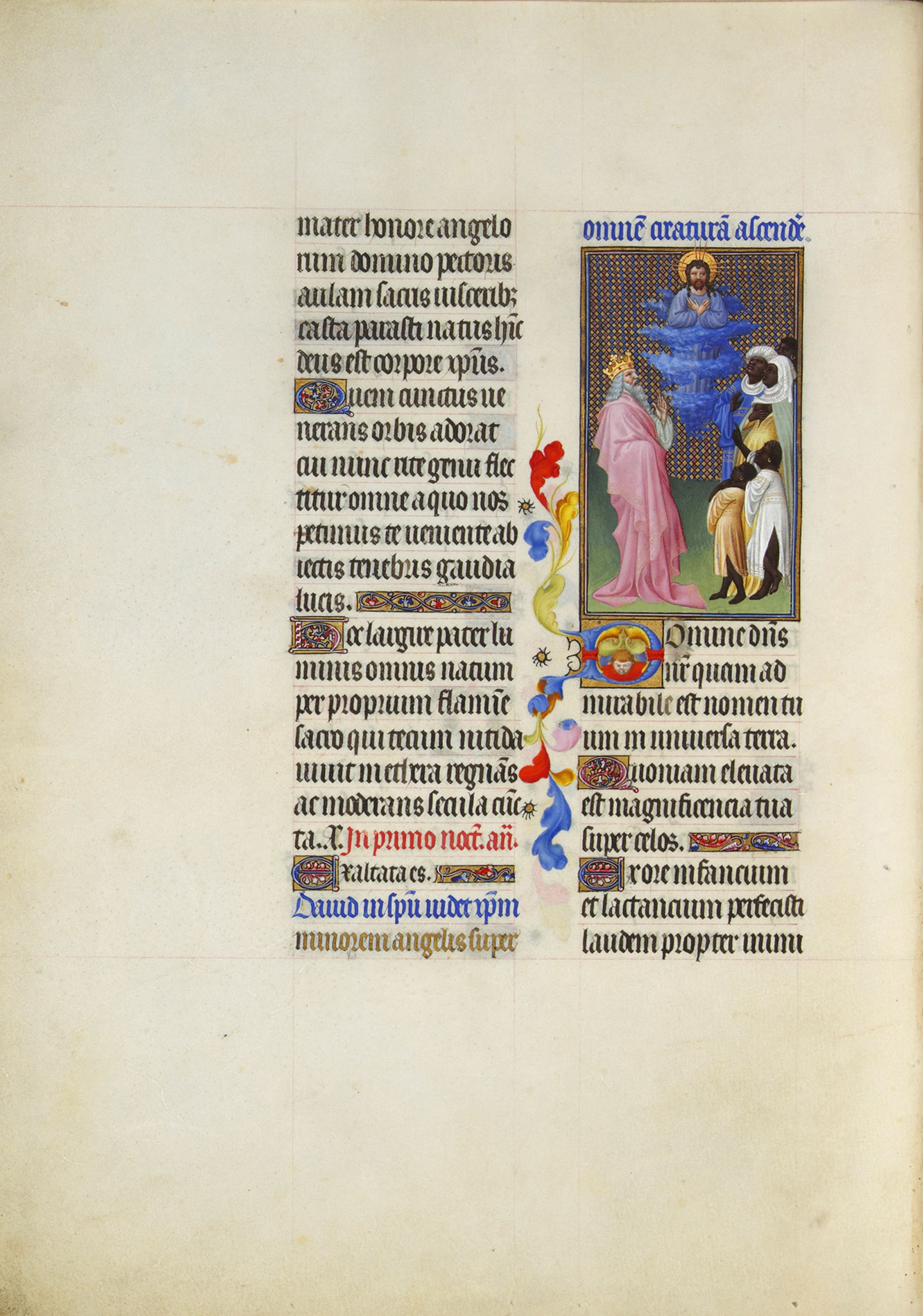
In Très Riches Heures du Duc de Berry, with miniature of King David seeing Christ elevated above all other beings

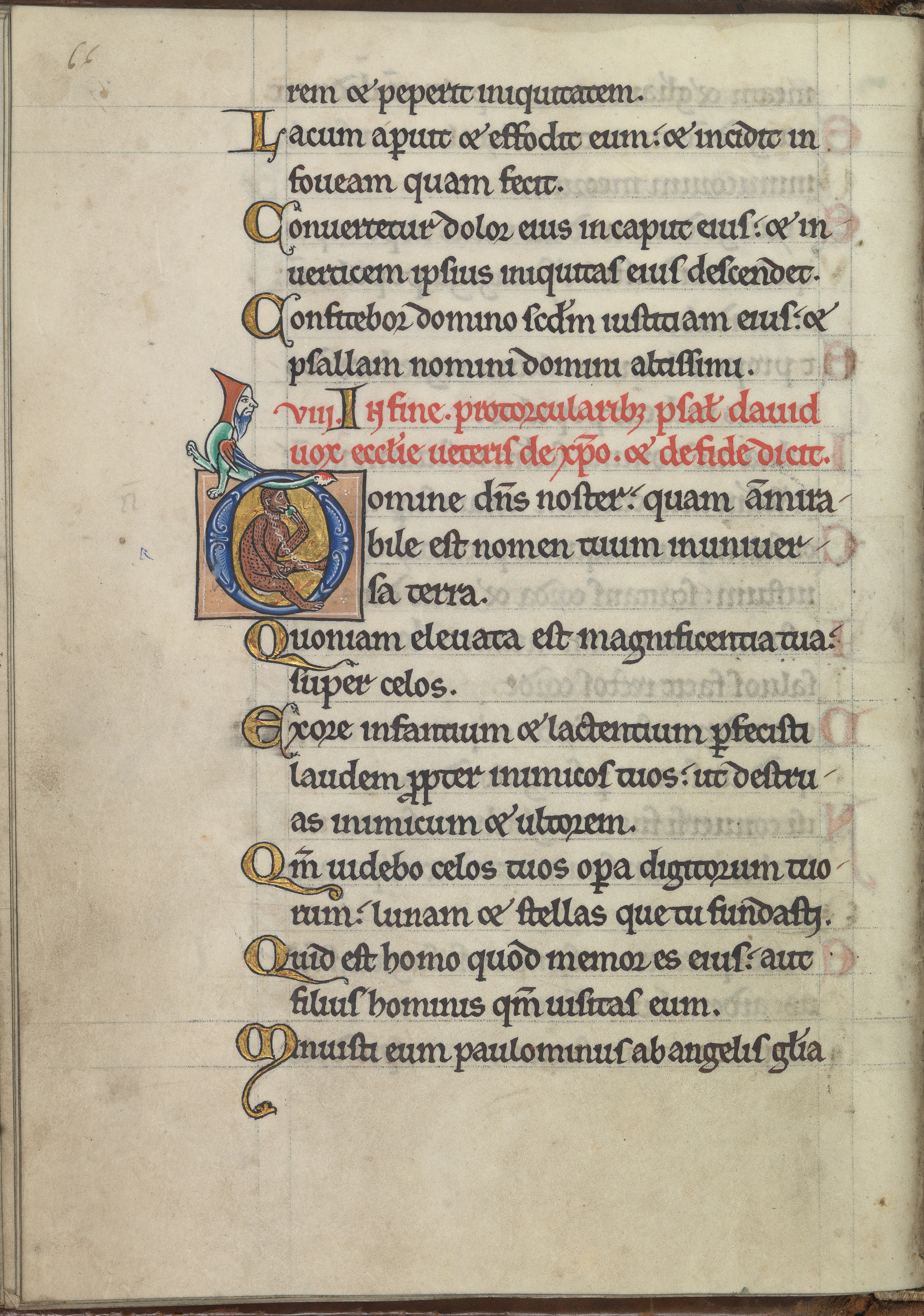
In the Psalter of
Eleanor of Aquitaine

== Sources ==
- Nahin, Paul J. (2014). Holy Sci-Fi!: Where Science Fiction and Religion Intersect. Springer Science & Business Media. p. 86. ISBN 978-1493906185.
- Scherman, Rabbi Nosson (1985). The Complete ArtScroll Machzor – Rosh Hashanah. Mesorah Publications, Ltd. ISBN 0-89906-676-3.
- Scherman, Rabbi Nosson (1986). The Complete ArtScroll Siddur (2nd ed.). Mesorah Publications, Ltd. ISBN 0-89906-650-X.
- Wright, Terry R. (2016). The Genesis of Fiction: Modern Novelists as Biblical Interpreters. Routledge. ISBN 978-1317030768.
