= Psalm 82 =

Biblical psalm

- "God standeth in the congregation of the mighty"
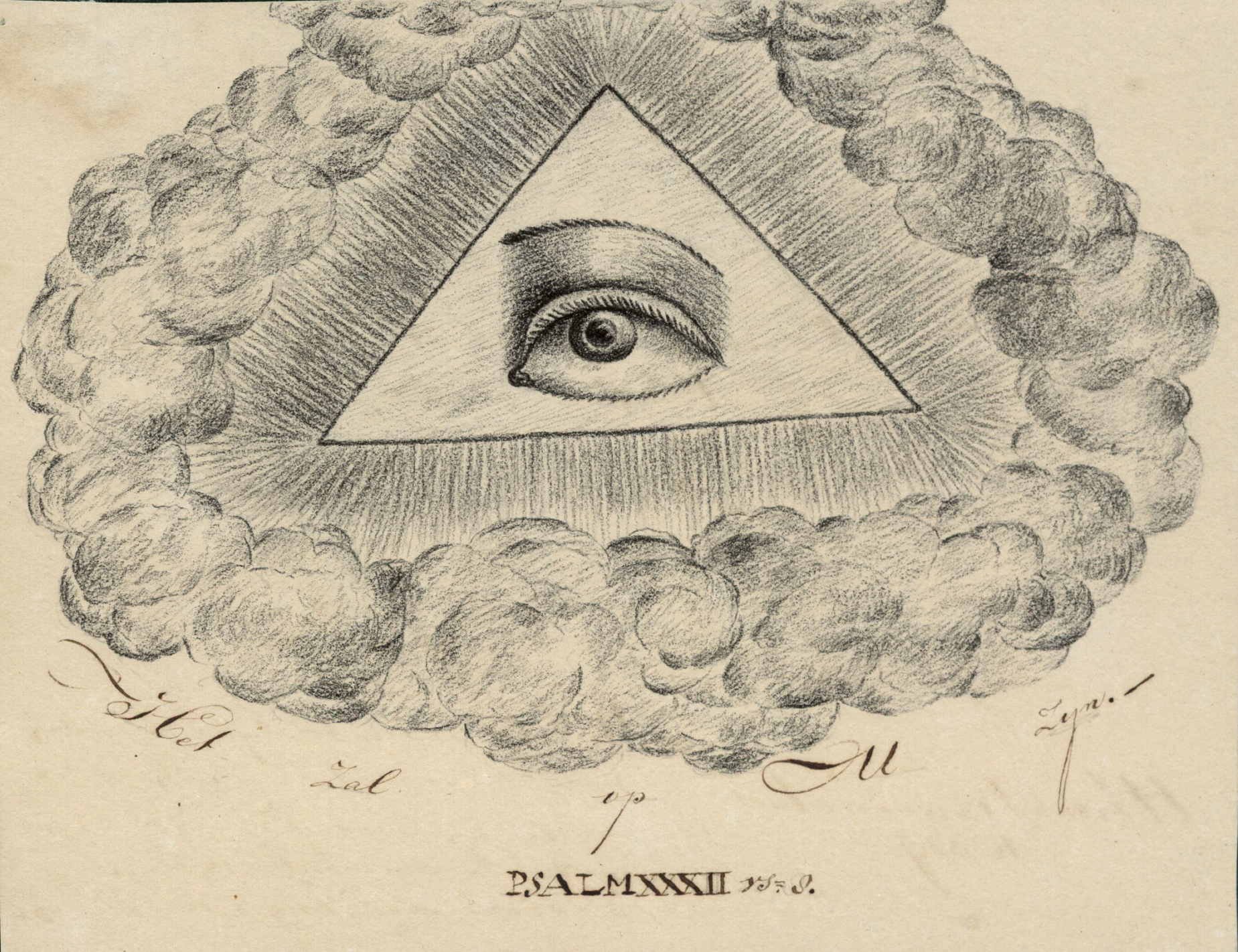
- Drawing for Psalm 82 in an album amicorum by Petronella Moens
- Other name: Psalm 81; "Deus stetit in synagoga deorum"
- Text: A psalm of Asaph
- Language: Hebrew (original)

Psalm 82
- ← Psalm 81 Psalm 83 →
- Book: Book of Psalms
- Hebrew Bible part: Ketuvim
- Order in the Hebrew part: 1
- Category: Sifrei Emet
- Christian Bible part: Old Testament
- Order in the Christian part: 19

Psalm 82 is the 82nd psalm of the Book of Psalms, beginning in English in the King James Version: "God standeth in the congregation of the mighty; he judgeth among the gods.". In the slightly different numbering system used in the Greek Septuagint and Latin Vulgate translations of the Bible, this psalm is Psalm 81. In Latin, it is known as "Deus stetit in synagoga deorum". It is one of the 12 Psalms of Asaph. The New King James Version describes it as "a plea for justice"; Alexander Kirkpatrick sees it as "a vision of God as the Judge of judges".

The psalm forms a regular part of Jewish, Catholic, Lutheran, Anglican and other Protestant liturgies. It has been set to music.

== Contextual interpretation ==
This psalm originates in the context of the ancient Hebrews, and their Ancient Near Eastern environment. Kirkpatrick observes how it "sets forth, in a highly poetical and imaginative form, the responsibility of earthly judges to the Supreme Judge." The final verse of the Psalm, verse 8, has God in the future tense "inheriting the nations", where elsewhere in the psalms, "the Son" inherited the nations in Psalm 2, and the believing community inherits the nations in Psalms 25 and 37.

== Uses ==
=== New Testament ===
Jesus quotes verse 6 in John 10:34: "I said, 'You are gods.'" Jesus uses this text to assert that he is not blaspheming when he calls himself the Son of God. The second part of verse 6, "All of you are sons of the Most High", does not appear in the text quoted by John. Quoting Bishop Westcott, Kirkpatrick says of this text: "The fact that it was possible for men so to represent God as to be called gods or divine was a foreshadowing of the Incarnation. 'There lay already in the Law the germ of the truth which Christ announced, the union of God and man.'"

Jesus alludes directly to Psalm 82, where the elohim (gods) receive the word of God in the form of judgment and condemnation. Against his accusers, Jesus was appealing to the precedent already established in the Torah, which referred to God's holy ones, or his divine council, as "gods" (elohim). In the Church of England's Book of Common Prayer, this psalm is appointed to be read in the evening of the 16th day of the month.

=== Judaism ===
- Psalm 82 is the psalm of the day in the Shir Shel Yom on Tuesday.
- It is recited on Hoshana Rabbah.
- Verse 1 is part of Mishnah Tamid 7:4 and is found in Pirkei Avot Chapter 3, no. 7.

=== Eastern Orthodox Church ===
In the Eastern Orthodox Church, Psalm 81 (Psalm 82 in the Masoretic Text) is part of the eleventh Kathisma division of the Psalter, read at Matins on Wednesday mornings, as well as on Tuesdays and Thursdays during Lent, at Matins and the Sixth Hour, respectively.

The Psalm is sung before the Gospel reading at the Vesperal Divine Liturgy of Holy Saturday, with verse 8 sung as a refrain. This is accompanied by the priest scattering flower petals and laurel leaves, representing the point at which the wicked and fallen angels have sentence pronounced against them during the Harrowing of Hell.

=== Musical settings ===
Heinrich Schütz set Psalm 82 in a metred version in German, "Singet mit Freuden unserm Gott", SWV 179, as part of the Becker Psalter, first published in 1628.

Norma Wendelburg composed a choral setting in English, "Arise, O God, to Judge the Earth" for mixed choir and optional organ in 1973.

== Scholarly Interpretations ==
The Psalm refers to both El and Yahweh in contexts where they are both traditionally translated as "God." While many scholars accept this fusion as intentional, others such as Mark S. Smith contend that the names reflect distinct entities presiding in the council, and that the psalm reflects an earlier Yahwist tradition which distinguished between the Canaanite high god and the head of the Israelite pantheon. The psalm is generally taken as evidence of the Ancient Israelite evolution through Henotheism into Monotheism. According to J. Edward Wright, the imagery of Psalm 82 is not far from a polytheistic context.

Michael S. Heiser argues against the notion that the plural elohim in Psalm 82 reflects an evolution from a polytheistic pantheon, or a distinction between El and Yahweh. Reviewing the passage alongside what he terms the "Deuteronomy 32 worldview," Heiser posits that it functions as a divine courtroom scene reacting directly to the Tower of Babel incident. According to this view, the Most High (Elyon), divided and disinherited the nations at Babel, placing them under the supervision of lesser, and created celestial beings (the Bene Ha-Elohim, or "Sons of God"), while claiming Israel as his personal allotment. Rather than tracing a historical shift to monotheism, Heiser argues the text depicts Israel's sovereign Creator God stripping these subordinate cosmic rulers of their immortality for abusing their power in accepting human worship. This framework preserves a spiritual hierarchy, and is argued to be consistent with ancient Israelite monolatry.

== Text ==
The following table shows the Hebrew text of the Psalm with vowels, alongside the Koine Greek text in the Septuagint and the English translation from the King James Version. Note that the meaning can slightly differ between these versions, as the Septuagint and the Masoretic Text come from different textual traditions. (Note: A 1917 translation directly from Hebrew to English by the Jewish Publication Society can be found here or here, and an 1844 translation directly from the Septuagint by L. C. L. Brenton can be found here. Both translations are in the public domain.) In the Septuagint, this psalm is numbered Psalm 81.

#	Hebrew	English	Greek
1	מִזְמ֗וֹר לְאָ֫סָ֥ף אֱֽלֹהִ֗ים נִצָּ֥ב בַּעֲדַת־אֵ֑ל בְּקֶ֖רֶב אֱלֹהִ֣ים יִשְׁפֹּֽט׃	(A Psalm of Asaph.) God standeth in the congregation of the mighty; he judgeth among the gods.	Ψαλμὸς τῷ ᾿Ασάφ. - Ο ΘΕΟΣ ἔστη ἐν συναγωγῇ θεῶν, ἐν μέσῳ δὲ θεοὺς διακρινεῖ.
2	עַד־מָתַ֥י תִּשְׁפְּטוּ־עָ֑וֶל וּפְנֵ֥י רְ֝שָׁעִ֗ים תִּשְׂאוּ־סֶֽלָה׃	How long will ye judge unjustly, and accept the persons of the wicked? Selah.	ἕως πότε κρίνετε ἀδικίαν καὶ πρόσωπα ἁμαρτωλῶν λαμβάνετε; (διάψαλμα).
3	שִׁפְטוּ־דַ֥ל וְיָת֑וֹם עָנִ֖י וָרָ֣שׁ הַצְדִּֽיקוּ׃	Defend the poor and fatherless: do justice to the afflicted and needy.	κρίνατε ὀρφανῷ καὶ πτωχῷ, ταπεινὸν καὶ πένητα δικαιώσατε·
4	פַּלְּטוּ־דַ֥ל וְאֶבְי֑וֹן מִיַּ֖ד רְשָׁעִ֣ים הַצִּֽילוּ׃	Deliver the poor and needy: rid them out of the hand of the wicked.	ἐξέλεσθε πένητα καὶ πτωχόν, ἐκ χειρὸς ἁμαρτωλοῦ ῥύσασθε αὐτόν.
5	לֹ֤א יָדְע֨וּ ׀ וְלֹ֥א יָבִ֗ינוּ בַּחֲשֵׁכָ֥ה יִתְהַלָּ֑כוּ יִ֝מּ֗וֹטוּ כׇּל־מ֥וֹסְדֵי אָֽרֶץ׃	They know not, neither will they understand; they walk on in darkness: all the foundations of the earth are out of course.	οὐκ ἔγνωσαν οὐδὲ συνῆκαν, ἐν σκότει διαπορεύονται· σαλευθήσονται πάντα τὰ θεμέλια τῆς γῆς.
6	אֲֽנִי־אָ֭מַרְתִּי אֱלֹהִ֣ים אַתֶּ֑ם וּבְנֵ֖י עֶלְי֣וֹן כֻּלְּכֶֽם׃	I have said, Ye are gods; and all of you are children of the most High.	ἐγὼ εἶπα· θεοί ἐστε καὶ υἱοὶ ῾Υψίστου πάντες·
7	אָ֭כֵן כְּאָדָ֣ם תְּמוּת֑וּן וּכְאַחַ֖ד הַשָּׂרִ֣ים תִּפֹּֽלוּ׃	But ye shall die like men, and fall like one of the princes.	ὑμεῖς δὲ ὡς ἄνθρωποι ἀποθνήσκετε καὶ ὡς εἷς τῶν ἀρχόντων πίπτετε.
8	קוּמָ֣ה אֱ֭לֹהִים שׇׁפְטָ֣ה הָאָ֑רֶץ כִּֽי־אַתָּ֥ה תִ֝נְחַ֗ל בְּכׇל־הַגּוֹיִֽם׃	Arise, O God, judge the earth: for thou shalt inherit all nations.	ἀνάστα, ὁ Θεός, κρίνων τὴν γῆν, ὅτι σὺ κατακληρονομήσεις ἐν πᾶσι τοῖς ἔθνεσι.

== See also ==
- Territorial spirit

== Bibliography ==
- Heiser, Michael (2015). The Unseen Realm: Recovering the Supernatural Worldview of the Bible (Kindle edition). Billingham, WA 98225, USA: Lexham Press. ISBN 978-1-57-799556-2.
