= Gitit =

Gitit may refer to:

- Gitit, Bik'at HaYarden, Israeli settlement on the West Bank
- Gittith, a Biblical musical designation
