= Psalm 79 =

Biblical psalm

- "O God, the heathen are come into thine inheritance"
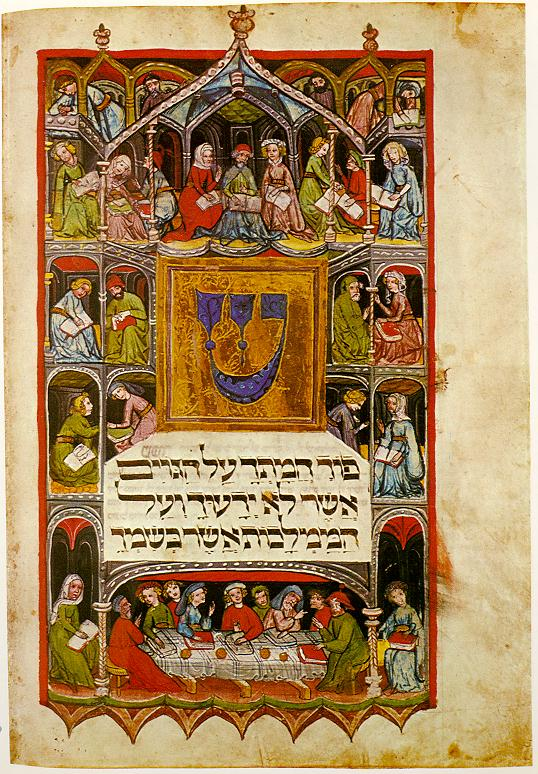
- Psalm 79:6 in Darmstädter Haggadah, a manuscript copied around 1430 in square Ashkenazic script. Illustrations by Israel b. Meir of Heidelberg.
- Other name: Psalmus 78; "Deus venerunt gentes in hereditatem tuam"
- Language: Hebrew (original)

Psalm 79
- ← Psalm 78 Psalm 80 →
- Book: Book of Psalms
- Hebrew Bible part: Ketuvim
- Order in the Hebrew part: 1
- Category: Sifrei Emet
- Christian Bible part: Old Testament
- Order in the Christian part: 19

Psalm 79 is the 79th psalm of the Book of Psalms, beginning in English in the King James Version: "O God, the heathen are come into thine inheritance". In the slightly different numbering system used in the Greek Septuagint and Latin Vulgate translations of the Bible, this psalm is Psalm 78. In Latin, it is known as "Deus venerunt gentes in hereditatem tuam". It is one of the 12 Psalms of Asaph. The New American Bible (Revised Edition) calls it "a prayer for Jerusalem".

The psalm forms a regular part of Jewish, Catholic, Lutheran, Anglican and other Protestant liturgies. It has been set to music, including works by William Byrd in Latin, Heinrich Schütz in German, and Artemy Vedel in Ukrainian.

== Context ==
The psalm has been described as a communal lament complaining that the nations have defiled the Temple in Jerusalem and murdered the holy people, leaving their corpses unburied (verses 1–4). The occasion is perhaps the destruction of Jerusalem by the Babylonian army in 587 BC. Others suggest a different era; Rudinger, Wilhelm de Wette, and others suggest that the reference in the psalm is to the later persecutions under Antiochus IV Epiphanes in the era of the Maccabean Revolt where Jerusalem was attacked and looted twice.

=== Mention in 1 Maccabees ===
The book 1 Maccabees directly quotes the Psalm in chapter 7, comparing the death of the Hasideans to the faithful ones slain near Jerusalem with none to bury them. It suggests a curious possibility for the author of the Psalm: if the Greek text is read shorn of context, it seems to imply that High Priest Alcimus wrote the Psalm. This is surprising in context, however, as 1 Maccabees considers Alcimus an evil villain who was responsible for the deaths of the Hasideans in the first place. Was it suggesting Alcimus was conflicted and that he mourned for those who died? Additionally, 1 Maccabees was probably written in Hebrew originally, so the Greek version that survived was a translation. There is no scholarly consensus on what the author meant: whether this was unclear phrasing or a translation hiccup, and it merely was the narrator noting the events were "as was written [in the Psalm]"; if Alcimus was quoting a Psalm already in existence; or if the author of 1 Maccabees truly meant that Alcimus was indeed the author of Psalm 79. Most translations generally err on the side of assuming the narrator was who was quoting the Psalm and making the comparison.

== Uses ==
=== Judaism ===
- This psalm is recited on the Seventeenth of Tammuz in some traditions.
- Verse 8 is a part of the final paragraph of Tachanun.
- Verse 9 is the final verse of the regular Tachanun, and is also a part of the long Tachanun recited on Mondays and Thursdays.
- Verse 10 is part of Av Harachamim.
- Verse 13 is part of Baruch Hashem L'Olam during Maariv. Part of Verse 13 is part of the Modim blessing of the Amidah.

=== Book of Common Prayer ===
In the Church of England's Book of Common Prayer, this psalm is appointed to be read on the morning of the sixteenth day of the month.

== Musical settings ==
William Byrd set Psalm 79 in Latin, Deus, venerunt gentes, T 25, as a motet for five voices. Heinrich Schütz set the psalm in a metred version in German, "Ach Herr, es ist der Heiden Herr", SWV 176, as part of the Becker Psalter, first published in 1628. Artemy Vedel composed a choral concerto based on the psalm, Bozhe, priidosha iazytsy v dostoianie Tvoe.

== Text ==
The following table shows the Hebrew text of the Psalm with vowels, alongside the Koine Greek text in the Septuagint and the English translation from the King James Version. Note that the meaning can slightly differ between these versions, as the Septuagint and the Masoretic Text come from different textual traditions. (Note: A 1917 translation directly from Hebrew to English by the Jewish Publication Society can be found here or here, and an 1844 translation directly from the Septuagint by L. C. L. Brenton can be found here. Both translations are in the public domain.) In the Septuagint, this psalm is numbered Psalm 78.

#	Hebrew	English	Greek
1	מִזְמ֗וֹר לְאָ֫סָ֥ף אֱֽלֹהִ֡ים בָּ֤אוּ גוֹיִ֨ם ׀ בְּֽנַחֲלָתֶ֗ךָ טִ֭מְּאוּ אֶת־הֵיכַ֣ל קׇדְשֶׁ֑ךָ שָׂ֖מוּ אֶת־יְרוּשָׁלַ֣͏ִם לְעִיִּֽים׃	(A Psalm of Asaph.) O God, the heathen are come into thine inheritance; thy holy temple have they defiled; they have laid Jerusalem on heaps.	Ψαλμὸς τῷ ᾿Ασάφ. - Ο ΘΕΟΣ, ἤλθοσαν ἔθνη εἰς τὴν κληρονομίαν σου, ἐμίαναν τὸν ναὸν τὸν ἅγιόν σου, ἔθεντο ῾Ιερουσαλὴμ ὡς ὀπωροφυλάκιον.
2	נָתְנ֡וּ אֶת־נִבְלַ֬ת עֲבָדֶ֗יךָ מַ֭אֲכָל לְע֣וֹף הַשָּׁמָ֑יִם בְּשַׂ֥ר חֲ֝סִידֶ֗יךָ לְחַיְתוֹ־אָֽרֶץ׃	The dead bodies of thy servants have they given to be meat unto the fowls of the heaven, the flesh of thy saints unto the beasts of the earth.	ἔθεντο τὰ θνησιμαῖα τῶν δούλων σου βρώματα τοῖς πετεινοῖς τοῦ οὐρανοῦ, τὰς σάρκας τῶν ὁσίων σου τοῖς θηρίοις τῆς γῆς·
3	שָׁפְכ֬וּ דָמָ֨ם ׀ כַּמַּ֗יִם סְֽבִ֘יב֤וֹת יְֽרוּשָׁלָ֗͏ִם וְאֵ֣ין קוֹבֵֽר׃	Their blood have they shed like water round about Jerusalem; and there was none to bury them.	ἐξέχεαν τὸ αἷμα αὐτῶν ὡσεὶ ὕδωρ κύκλῳ ῾Ιερουσαλήμ, καὶ οὐκ ἦν ὁ θάπτων.
4	הָיִ֣ינוּ חֶ֭רְפָּה לִשְׁכֵנֵ֑ינוּ לַ֥עַג וָ֝קֶ֗לֶס לִסְבִיבוֹתֵֽינוּ׃	We are become a reproach to our neighbours, a scorn and derision to them that are round about us.	ἐγενήθημεν ὄνειδος τοῖς γείτοσιν ἡμῶν, μυκτηρισμὸς καὶ χλευασμὸς τοῖς κύκλῳ ἡμῶν.
5	עַד־מָ֣ה יְ֭הֹוָה תֶּאֱנַ֣ף לָנֶ֑צַח תִּבְעַ֥ר כְּמוֹ־אֵ֝֗שׁ קִנְאָתֶֽךָ׃	How long, LORD? wilt thou be angry for ever? shall thy jealousy burn like fire?	ἕως πότε, Κύριε, ὀργισθήσῃ εἰς τέλος, ἐκκαυθήσεται ὡς πῦρ ὁ ζῆλός σου;
6	שְׁפֹ֤ךְ חֲמָתְךָ֗ אֶֽל־הַגּוֹיִם֮ אֲשֶׁ֢ר לֹא־יְדָ֫ע֥וּךָ וְעַ֥ל מַמְלָכ֑וֹת אֲשֶׁ֥ר בְּ֝שִׁמְךָ֗ לֹ֣א קָרָֽאוּ׃	Pour out thy wrath upon the heathen that have not known thee, and upon the kingdoms that have not called upon thy name.	ἔκχεον τὴν ὀργήν σου ἐπὶ τὰ ἔθνη τὰ μὴ γινώσκοντά σε καὶ ἐπὶ βασιλείας, αἳ τὸ ὄνομά σου οὐκ ἐπεκαλέσαντο,
7	כִּ֭י אָכַ֣ל אֶֽת־יַעֲקֹ֑ב וְֽאֶת־נָוֵ֥הוּ הֵשַֽׁמּוּ׃	For they have devoured Jacob, and laid waste his dwelling place.	ὅτι κατέφαγον τὸν ᾿Ιακώβ, καὶ τὸν τόπον αὐτοῦ ἠρήμωσαν.
8	אַֽל־תִּזְכׇּר־לָנוּ֮ עֲוֺנֹ֢ת רִאשֹׁ֫נִ֥ים מַ֭הֵר יְקַדְּמ֣וּנוּ רַחֲמֶ֑יךָ כִּ֖י דַלּ֣וֹנוּ מְאֹֽד׃	O remember not against us former iniquities: let thy tender mercies speedily prevent us: for we are brought very low.	μὴ μνησθῇς ἡμῶν ἀνομιῶν ἀρχαίων· ταχὺ προκαταλαβέτωσαν ἡμᾶς οἱ οἰκτιρμοί σου, Κύριε, ὅτι ἐπτωχεύσαμεν σφόδρα.
9	עׇזְרֵ֤נוּ ׀ אֱלֹ֘הֵ֤י יִשְׁעֵ֗נוּ עַֽל־דְּבַ֥ר כְּבֽוֹד־שְׁמֶ֑ךָ וְהַצִּילֵ֥נוּ וְכַפֵּ֥ר עַל־חַ֝טֹּאתֵ֗ינוּ לְמַ֣עַן שְׁמֶֽךָ׃	Help us, O God of our salvation, for the glory of thy name: and deliver us, and purge away our sins, for thy name's sake.	βοήθησον ἡμῖν, ὁ Θεός, ὁ σωτὴρ ἡμῶν· ἕνεκεν τῆς δόξης τοῦ ὀνόματός σου, Κύριε, ῥῦσαι ἡμᾶς καὶ ἱλάσθητι ταῖς ἁμαρτίαις ἡμῶν ἕνεκα τοῦ ὀνόματός σου,
10	לָ֤מָּה ׀ יֹאמְר֣וּ הַגּוֹיִם֮ אַיֵּ֢ה אֱֽלֹהֵ֫יהֶ֥ם יִוָּדַ֣ע (בגיים) [בַּגּוֹיִ֣ם] לְעֵינֵ֑ינוּ נִ֝קְמַ֗ת דַּֽם־עֲבָדֶ֥יךָ הַשָּׁפֽוּךְ׃	Wherefore should the heathen say, Where is their God? let him be known among the heathen in our sight by the revenging of the blood of thy servants which is shed.	μή ποτε εἴπωσι τὰ ἔθνη· ποῦ ἔστιν ὁ Θεὸς αὐτῶν; καὶ γνωσθήτω ἐν τοῖς ἔθνεσιν ἐνώπιον τῶν ὀφθαλμῶν ἡμῶν ἡ ἐκδίκησις τοῦ αἵματος τῶν δούλων σου τοῦ ἐκκεχυμένου.
11	תָּ֤ב֣וֹא לְפָנֶיךָ֮ אֶנְקַ֢ת אָ֫סִ֥יר כְּגֹ֥דֶל זְרוֹעֲךָ֑ ה֝וֹתֵ֗ר בְּנֵ֣י תְמוּתָֽה׃	Let the sighing of the prisoner come before thee; according to the greatness of thy power preserve thou those that are appointed to die;	εἰσελθέτω ἐνώπιόν σου ὁ στεναγμὸς τῶν πεπεδημένων, κατὰ τὴν μεγαλωσύνην τοῦ βραχίονός σου περιποίησαι τοὺς υἱοὺς τῶν τεθανατωμένων.
12	וְהָ֘שֵׁ֤ב לִשְׁכֵנֵ֣ינוּ שִׁ֭בְעָתַיִם אֶל־חֵיקָ֑ם חֶרְפָּ֘תָ֤ם אֲשֶׁ֖ר חֵרְפ֣וּךָ אֲדֹנָֽי׃	And render unto our neighbours sevenfold into their bosom their reproach, wherewith they have reproached thee, O Lord.	ἀπόδος τοῖς γείτοσιν ἡμῶν ἑπταπλασίονα εἰς τὸν κόλπον αὐτῶν τὸν ὀνειδισμὸν αὐτῶν, ὃν ὠνείδισάν σε, Κύριε.
13	וַאֲנַ֤חְנוּ עַמְּךָ֨ ׀ וְצֹ֥אן מַרְעִיתֶךָ֮ נ֤וֹדֶ֥ה לְּךָ֗ לְע֫וֹלָ֥ם לְד֥וֹר וָדֹ֑ר נְ֝סַפֵּ֗ר תְּהִלָּתֶֽךָ׃	So we thy people and sheep of thy pasture will give thee thanks for ever: we will shew forth thy praise to all generations.	ἡμεῖς δὲ λαός σου καὶ πρόβατα νομῆς σου ἀνθομολογησόμεθά σοι εἰς τὸν αἰῶνα, εἰς γενεὰν καὶ γενεὰν ἐξαγγελοῦμεν τὴν αἴνεσίν σου.
