= Psalm 80 =

80th psalm in the biblical Book of Psalms

- "Give ear, O Shepherd of Israel"
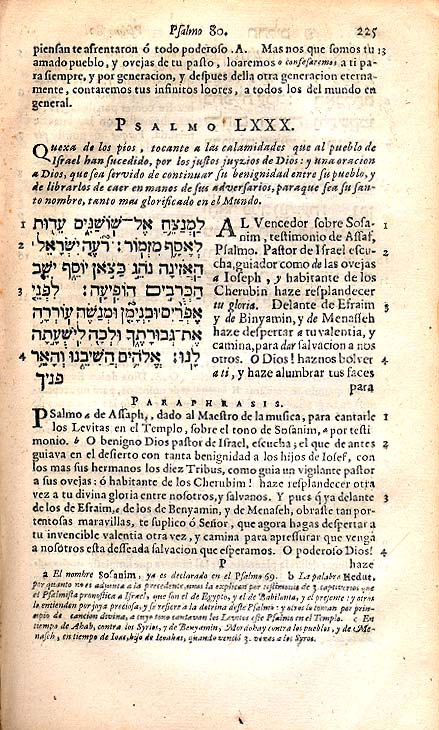
- Psalm 80 from Las alabancas de santidad, a Spanish translation of the Books of Psalms by Rabbi Judah Leon Templo (d. 1675), Amsterdam 1671.
- Other name: Psalm 79; "Qui regis Israel intende"
- Language: Hebrew (original)

Psalm 80
- ← Psalm 79 Psalm 81 →
- Book: Book of Psalms
- Hebrew Bible part: Ketuvim
- Order in the Hebrew part: 1
- Category: Sifrei Emet
- Christian Bible part: Old Testament
- Order in the Christian part: 19

Psalm 80 is the 80th psalm of the Book of Psalms, beginning in English in the King James Version: "Give ear, O Shepherd of Israel, thou that leadest Joseph like a flock". In the slightly different numbering system used in the Greek Septuagint and Latin Vulgate translations of the Bible, this psalm is Psalm 79. In Latin, it is known as "Qui regis Israel intende". It is one of the 12 Psalms of Asaph. The New American Bible (Revised Edition) calls it "a prayer for Jerusalem". The Jerusalem Bible describes it as "a prayer for the restoration of Israel".

The psalm forms a regular part of Jewish, Catholic, Lutheran, Anglican and other Protestant liturgies. It has been set to music, by composers including John Bennet and Heinrich Schütz, and notably Albert Roussel who composed an extended setting in English for tenor, choir and orchestra, completed in 1928.

== Commentary ==
This psalm is classified as a 'communal lament'. Northern Israel is its main concern, so it may come from the period towards the end of the northern kingdom, although the Jerusalem Bible suggest that "it could apply equally well ... to Judah after the sack of Jerusalem in 586 BC".

Some links have been traced to Isaiah, with a 'similar image of a vineyard whose wall God breaks down' (Isaiah 5:1–7), also to Jeremiah and Ezekiel, who both refer to YHWH as shepherd, although the exact phrase 'Shepherd of Israel' is unique in this psalm.

The existence of a refrain (verses 3, 7, 19) is unusual, and the first two mark off the first two parts of the psalm, with the rest of the psalm forming a final section. The division is as follows:

1. Verses 1–2: a call to God for help (refrain in verse 3)
2. Verses 4–6: an urgent plea and complaint at God's treatment of his people (refrain in verse 7)
3. Verses 8–13: a description of God's past care of Israel (with the figure of the vine alluding to the Exodus and conquest, and the present distress)
4. Verses 14–17: a renewal of petition with a vow to return to God in verse 18, and a repetition of the refrain in verse 19.

=== Verse 17 ===
Let Your hand be upon the man of Your right hand,
Upon the son of man whom You made strong for Yourself.

This verse probably alludes to Zerubbabel, who returned to Jerusalem in the first wave of liberated exiles under the decree of Cyrus the Great in 538 BC.

== Uses ==
=== Judaism ===
- This psalm is recited on the third day of Passover in some traditions, and on the second day of Sukkot in some traditions.

=== Christianity ===
- This psalm is recited some days during Lent, as part of Lauds (Morning Prayer) of the Divine Office.
- In the Church of England's Book of Common Prayer, this psalm is appointed to be read on the morning of the 16th day of the month.

=== Musical settings ===
John Bennet contributed Psalm 80 in English, Thou heard that Israel dost keepe, among a few others, to the 1621 collection The Whole Booke of Psalmes. Heinrich Schütz set the psalm in a metred version in German, "Du Hirt Israel, höre uns", SWV 177, as part of the Becker Psalter, first published in 1628.

Albert Roussel composed an extended setting in English for tenor, choir and orchestra, Psaume LXXX, completed in 1928 and first performed the following year. Alan Hovhaness made an unpublished setting of this psalm in 1953 titled Shepherd of Israel for tenor, recorder (or flute), trumpet ad lib. & string quartet (or orchestra). Emil Naumann composed a choral work setting the psalm in German, Du Hirte Israels, höre, published in Berlin in 2003.

== Text ==
The following table shows the Hebrew text of the Psalm with vowels, alongside the Koine Greek text in the Septuagint and the English translation from the King James Version. Note that the meaning can slightly differ between these versions, as the Septuagint and the Masoretic Text come from different textual traditions. (Note: A 1917 translation directly from Hebrew to English by the Jewish Publication Society can be found here or here, and an 1844 translation directly from the Septuagint by L. C. L. Brenton can be found here. Both translations are in the public domain.) In the Septuagint, this psalm is numbered Psalm 79.

#	Hebrew	English	Greek
(Note: In the Jewish verse numbering, the ascription of this psalm is verse 1, and the rest of the psalm begins from verse 2. However, the Christian verse numbering does not count the ascription.)	לַמְנַצֵּ֥חַ אֶל־שֹׁשַׁנִּ֑ים עֵד֖וּת לְאָסָ֣ף מִזְמֽוֹר׃	(To the chief Musician upon Shoshannimeduth, (Note: Shoshannim Eduth, meaning "Lilies of Testimony", may have been the name of a particular tune or style.) A Psalm of Asaph.)	Εἰς τὸ τέλος, ὑπὲρ τῶν ἀλλοιωθησομένων· μαρτύριον τῷ ᾿Ασάφ, ψαλμὸς ὑπὲρ τοῦ ᾿Ασσυρίου. -
1	רֹ֘עֵ֤ה יִשְׂרָאֵ֨ל ׀ הַאֲזִ֗ינָה נֹהֵ֣ג כַּצֹּ֣אן יוֹסֵ֑ף יֹשֵׁ֖ב הַכְּרוּבִ֣ים הוֹפִֽיעָה׃	Give ear, O Shepherd of Israel, thou that leadest Joseph like a flock; thou that dwellest between the cherubims, shine forth.	Ο ΠΟΙΜΑΙΝΩΝ τὸν ᾿Ισραήλ, πρόσχες, ὁ ὁδηγῶν ὡσεὶ πρόβατα τὸν ᾿Ιωσήφ. ὁ καθήμενος ἐπὶ τῶν Χερουβίμ, ἐμφάνηθι.
2	לִפְנֵ֤י אֶפְרַ֨יִם ׀ וּבִנְיָ֘מִ֤ן וּמְנַשֶּׁ֗ה עוֹרְרָ֥ה אֶת־גְּבוּרָתֶ֑ךָ וּלְכָ֖ה לִישֻׁעָ֣תָה לָּֽנוּ׃	Before Ephraim and Benjamin and Manasseh stir up thy strength, and come and save us.	ἐναντίον ᾿Εφραὶμ καὶ Βενιαμὶν καὶ Μανασσῆ ἐξέγειρον τὴν δυναστείαν σου καὶ ἐλθὲ εἰς τὸ σῶσαι ἡμᾶς.
3	אֱלֹהִ֥ים הֲשִׁיבֵ֑נוּ וְהָאֵ֥ר פָּ֝נֶ֗יךָ וְנִוָּשֵֽׁעָה׃	Turn us again, O God, and cause thy face to shine; and we shall be saved.	ὁ Θεός, ἐπίστρεψον ἡμᾶς καὶ ἐπίφανον τὸ πρόσωπόν σου καὶ σωθησόμεθα.
4	יְהֹוָ֣ה אֱלֹהִ֣ים צְבָא֑וֹת עַד־מָתַ֥י עָ֝שַׁ֗נְתָּ בִּתְפִלַּ֥ת עַמֶּֽךָ׃	O LORD God of hosts, how long wilt thou be angry against the prayer of thy people?	Κύριε ὁ Θεὸς τῶν δυνάμεων, ἕως πότε ὀργίζῃ ἐπὶ τὴν προσευχὴν τῶν δούλων σου;
5	הֶ֭אֱכַלְתָּם לֶ֣חֶם דִּמְעָ֑ה וַ֝תַּשְׁקֵ֗מוֹ בִּדְמָע֥וֹת שָׁלִֽישׁ׃	Thou feedest them with the bread of tears; and givest them tears to drink in great measure.	ψωμιεῖς ἡμᾶς ἄρτον δακρύων; καὶ ποτιεῖς ἡμᾶς ἐν δάκρυσιν ἐν μέτρῳ;
6	תְּשִׂימֵ֣נוּ מָ֭דוֹן לִשְׁכֵנֵ֑ינוּ וְ֝אֹיְבֵ֗ינוּ יִלְעֲגוּ־לָֽמוֹ׃	Thou makest us a strife unto our neighbours: and our enemies laugh among themselves.	ἔθου ἡμᾶς εἰς ἀντιλογίαν τοῖς γείτοσιν ἡμῶν, καὶ οἱ ἐχθροὶ ἡμῶν ἐμυκτήρισαν ἡμᾶς.
7	אֱלֹהִ֣ים צְבָא֣וֹת הֲשִׁיבֵ֑נוּ וְהָאֵ֥ר פָּ֝נֶ֗יךָ וְנִוָּשֵֽׁעָה׃	Turn us again, O God of hosts, and cause thy face to shine; and we shall be saved.	Κύριε ὁ Θεὸς τῶν δυνάμεων, ἐπίστρεψον ἡμᾶς καὶ ἐπίφανον τὸ πρόσωπόν σου, καὶ σωθησόμεθα. (διάψαλμα).
8	גֶּ֭פֶן מִמִּצְרַ֣יִם תַּסִּ֑יעַ תְּגָרֵ֥שׁ גּ֝וֹיִ֗ם וַתִּטָּעֶֽהָ׃	Thou hast brought a vine out of Egypt: thou hast cast out the heathen, and planted it.	ἄμπελον ἐξ Αἰγύπτου μετῇρας, ἐξέβαλες ἔθνη καὶ κατεφύτευσας αὐτήν·
9	פִּנִּ֥יתָ לְפָנֶ֑יהָ וַתַּשְׁרֵ֥שׁ שׇׁ֝רָשֶׁ֗יהָ וַתְּמַלֵּא־אָֽרֶץ׃	Thou preparedst room before it, and didst cause it to take deep root, and it filled the land.	ὡδοποίησας ἔμπροσθεν αὐτῆς καὶ κατεφύτευσας τὰς ῥίζας αὐτῆς, καὶ ἐπλήρωσε τὴν γῆν.
10	כָּסּ֣וּ הָרִ֣ים צִלָּ֑הּ וַ֝עֲנָפֶ֗יהָ אַֽרְזֵי־אֵֽל׃	The hills were covered with the shadow of it, and the boughs thereof were like the goodly cedars.	ἐκάλυψεν ὄρη ἡ σκιὰ αὐτῆς καὶ αἱ ἀναδενδράδες αὐτῆς τὰς κέδρους τοῦ Θεοῦ·
11	תְּשַׁלַּ֣ח קְצִירֶ֣הָ עַד־יָ֑ם וְאֶל־נָ֝הָ֗ר יוֹנְקוֹתֶֽיהָ׃	She sent out her boughs unto the sea, and her branches unto the river.	ἐξέτεινε τὰ κλήματα αὐτῆς ἕως θαλάσσης καὶ ἕως ποταμῶν τὰς παραφυάδας αὐτῆς.
12	לָ֭מָּה פָּרַ֣צְתָּ גְדֵרֶ֑יהָ וְ֝אָר֗וּהָ כׇּל־עֹ֥בְרֵי דָֽרֶךְ׃	Why hast thou then broken down her hedges, so that all they which pass by the way do pluck her?	ἱνατί καθεῖλες τὸν φραγμὸν αὐτῆς καὶ τρυγῶσιν αὐτὴν πάντες οἱ παραπορευόμενοι τὴν ὁδόν;
13	יְכַרְסְמֶ֣נָּֽה חֲזִ֣יר מִיָּ֑עַר וְזִ֖יז שָׂדַ֣י יִרְעֶֽנָּה׃	The boar out of the wood doth waste it, and the wild beast of the field doth devour it.	ἐλυμήνατο αὐτὴν ὗς ἐκ δρυμοῦ, καὶ μονιὸς ἄγριος κατενεμήσατο αὐτήν.
14	אֱלֹהִ֣ים צְבָאוֹת֮ שֽׁ֫וּב־נָ֥א הַבֵּ֣ט מִשָּׁמַ֣יִם וּרְאֵ֑ה וּ֝פְקֹ֗ד גֶּ֣פֶן זֹֽאת׃	Return, we beseech thee, O God of hosts: look down from heaven, and behold, and visit this vine;	ὁ Θεὸς τῶν δυνάμεων, ἐπίστρεψον δή, καὶ ἐπίβλεψον ἐξ οὐρανοῦ καὶ ἴδε καὶ ἐπίσκεψαι τὴν ἄμπελον ταύτην
15	וְ֭כַנָּה אֲשֶׁר־נָטְעָ֣ה יְמִינֶ֑ךָ וְעַל־בֵּ֝֗ן אִמַּ֥צְתָּה לָּֽךְ׃	And the vineyard which thy right hand hath planted, and the branch that thou madest strong for thyself.	καὶ κατάρτισαι αὐτήν, ἣν ἐφύτευσεν ἡ δεξιά σου, καὶ ἐπὶ υἱὸν ἀνθρώπου, ὃν ἐκραταίωσας σεαυτῷ.
16	שְׂרֻפָ֣ה בָאֵ֣שׁ כְּסוּחָ֑ה מִגַּעֲרַ֖ת פָּנֶ֣יךָ יֹאבֵֽדוּ׃	It is burned with fire, it is cut down: they perish at the rebuke of thy countenance.	ἐμπεπυρισμένη πυρὶ καὶ ἀνεσκαμμένη· ἀπὸ ἐπιτιμήσεως τοῦ προσώπου σου ἀπολοῦνται.
17	תְּֽהִי־יָ֭דְךָ עַל־אִ֣ישׁ יְמִינֶ֑ךָ עַל־בֶּן־אָ֝דָ֗ם אִמַּ֥צְתָּ לָּֽךְ׃	Let thy hand be upon the man of thy right hand, upon the son of man whom thou madest strong for thyself.	γενηθήτω ἡ χείρ σου ἐπ᾿ ἄνδρα δεξιᾶς σου καὶ ἐπὶ υἱὸν ἀνθρώπου, ὃν ἐκραταίωσας σεαυτῷ·
18	וְלֹֽא־נָס֥וֹג מִמֶּ֑ךָּ תְּ֝חַיֵּ֗נוּ וּבְשִׁמְךָ֥ נִקְרָֽא׃	So will not we go back from thee: quicken us, and we will call upon thy name.	καὶ οὐ μὴ ἀποστῶμεν ἀπὸ σοῦ, ζωώσεις ἡμᾶς, καὶ τὸ ὄνομά σου ἐπικαλεσόμεθα.
19	יְ֘הֹוָ֤ה אֱלֹהִ֣ים צְבָא֣וֹת הֲשִׁיבֵ֑נוּ הָאֵ֥ר פָּ֝נֶ֗יךָ וְנִוָּשֵֽׁעָה׃	Turn us again, O LORD God of hosts, cause thy face to shine; and we shall be saved.	Κύριε, ὁ Θεὸς τῶν δυνάμεων, ἐπίστρεψον ἡμᾶς καὶ ἐπίφανον τὸ πρόσωπόν σου, καὶ σωθησόμεθα.
