= Psalm 81 =

81st psalm of the book of psalms

- "Sing aloud unto God our strength"
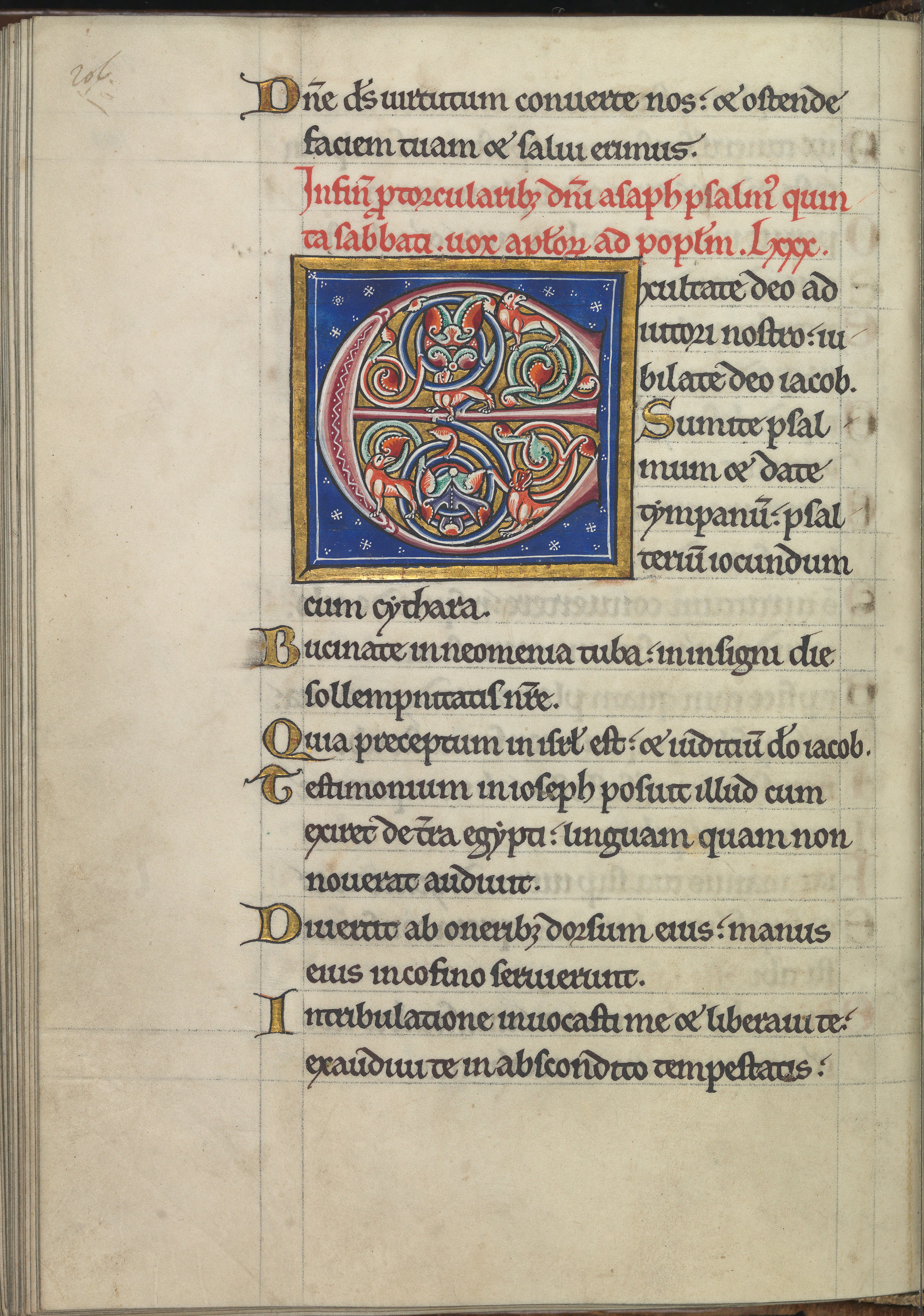
- Psalm 81 (Psalm 80 in Vulgate) from Psalter of Eleanor of Aquitaine (ca. 1185) - KB 76 F 13, folium 103v
- Other name: Psalm 80; "Exultate deo adiutori nostro"
- Text: A Psalm of Asaph
- Language: Hebrew (original)

Psalm 81
- ← Psalm 80 Psalm 82 →
- Book: Book of Psalms
- Hebrew Bible part: Ketuvim
- Order in the Hebrew part: 1
- Category: Sifrei Emet
- Christian Bible part: Old Testament
- Order in the Christian part: 19

Psalm 81 is the 81st psalm of the Book of Psalms, beginning in English in the King James Version: "Sing aloud unto God our strength". In the slightly different numbering system used in the Greek Septuagint and Latin Vulgate translations of the Bible, this psalm is Psalm 80. In Latin, it is known as "Exultate deo adiutori nostro". It is one of the 12 Psalms of Asaph. Its themes relate to celebration and repentance. In the New King James Version its sub-title is "An Appeal for Israel's Repentance".

The psalm forms a regular part of Jewish, Catholic, Lutheran, Anglican and other Protestant liturgies. It has been set to music.

== Commentary ==
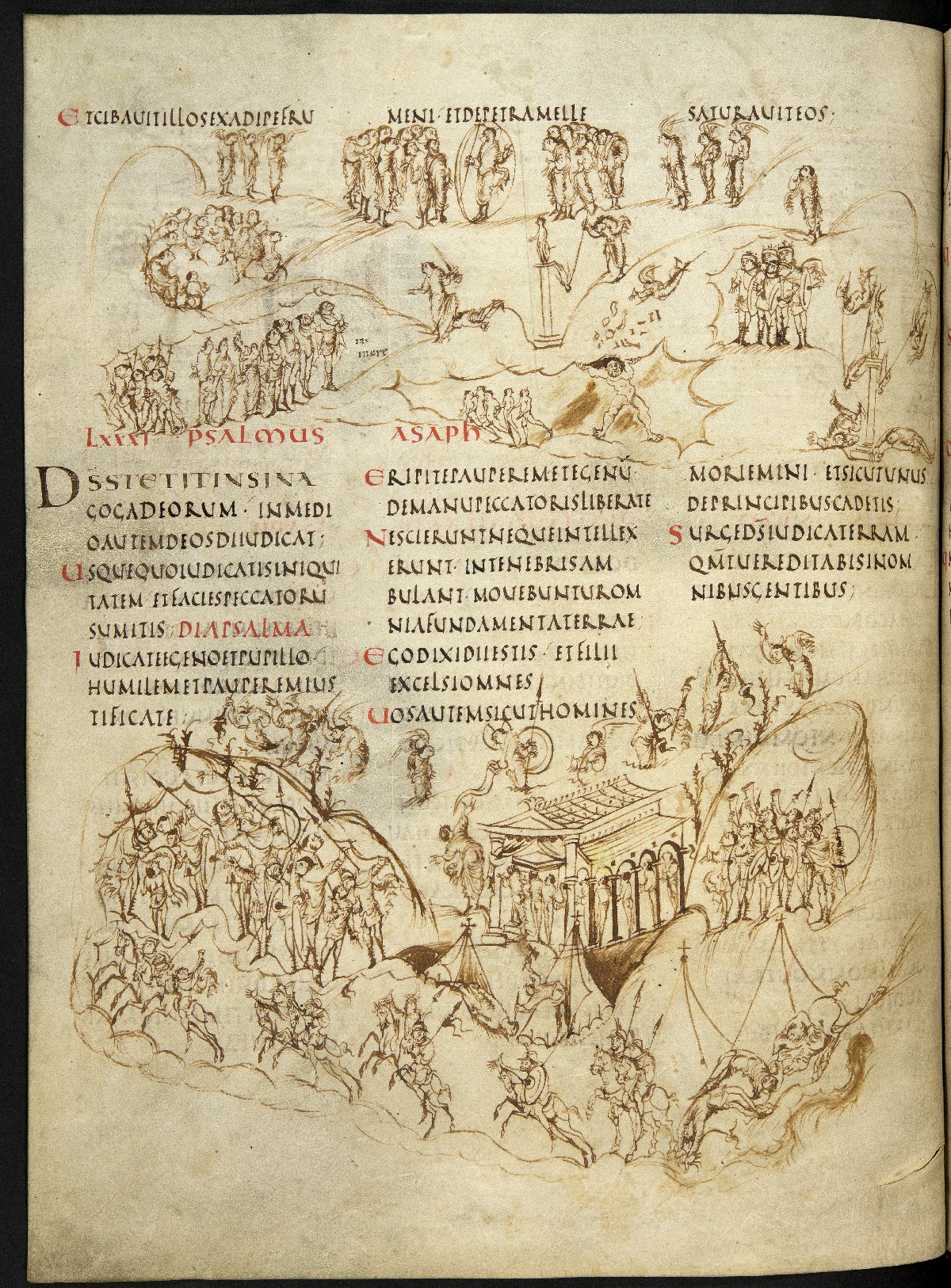
Start of Psalm 81, from the Utrecht Psalter, c. 800, Utrecht University Library

The reference to the new moon and full moon as well as the blowing of the trumpet in verse 3 may reflect the celebration of New Year and Tabernacles. The teaching of verses 9 and 10 is similar to the beginning of the Decalogue, although 'the words for "strange" god and "foreign" god are different from the "other gods" in Exodus 20 and Deuteronomy 5, with the verb "brought [you] up" and the order of the phrases reversed.

The beginning of the psalm is like a hymn (verses 1–5b), which is followed by an oracle (verses 5c–16). In particular, verses 6-10 describe 'God's deliverance of his people from Egypt', whereas verses 11-16 recall the past disobedience of the people and promise to give victory over their enemies if they obey God.

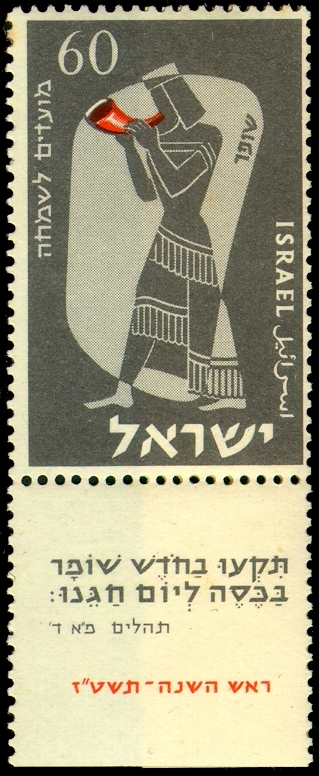
Joyous Festivals 5716 stamp - 60 mil - Ram's horn with the inscription on tab of verse 81:4 (in Hebrew).

== Significance ==
W. Robert Godfrey, made a case that the poetic center of the Psalter being the middle book (book 3 of 5), middle Psalm (8 of 17) and even point to the middle verses of this Psalm (Psalm 81:8,9 with "if only my people would listen").

== Uses ==
=== Judaism ===
- The psalm is recited in its entirety in the Shir Shel Yom of Thursday.
- It is recited on Rosh Hashanah in some traditions.
- It is recited on the sixth day of Sukkot in some traditions.
- Verse 2 is part of Mishnah Tamid 7:4.
- Verse 3 is part of the blessings before the Shema on the second day of Rosh Hashanah.
- Verses 4-5 are part of the daytime Kiddush on Rosh Hashanah.
- Verse 5 is found in the Mussaf Amidah on Rosh Hashanah.
- Verse 11 is the seventh verse of Hoshia Et Amecha in Pesukei Dezimra.

=== Book of Common Prayer ===
In the Church of England's Book of Common Prayer, this psalm is appointed to be read on the morning of the sixteenth day of the month.

=== Musical settings ===
Heinrich Schütz set Psalm 81 in a metred version in German, "Singet mit Freuden unserm Gott", SWV 178, as part of the Becker Psalter, first published in 1628. George Frideric Handel composed a movement of his Occasional Oratorio, HWV 62, setting verses 1 and 2 c. 1745.

William Walton's 1931 cantata Belshazzar's Feast takes text from the psalm. In 1964, Herman Berlinski used the psalm in English, Sing joyfully, for four-part choir, organ and obbligato trumpet, combining it with texts from the High Holiday Prayerbook). Verses 1-4 were set by Adrian Batten in a sacred anthem entitled "O sing joyfully". Verse 1 was set by Alan Hovhaness for his motet Opus 68 Sing Aloud.

Ofer Ben-Amots set the psalm in Hebrew for mixed choir and metal percussion in 1989. A 2022 song by New Zealand singer Brooke Ligertwood, "Honey in the Rock", is based on verse 16. An al-female a cappella group, Sweet Honey in the Rock, founded in 1973, takes its name from the same verse.

== Text ==
The following table shows the Hebrew text of the Psalm with vowels, alongside the Koine Greek text in the Septuagint and the English translation from the King James Version. Note that the meaning can slightly differ between these versions, as the Septuagint and the Masoretic Text come from different textual traditions. (Note: A 1917 translation directly from Hebrew to English by the Jewish Publication Society can be found here or here, and an 1844 translation directly from the Septuagint by L. C. L. Brenton can be found here. Both translations are in the public domain.) In the Septuagint, this psalm is numbered Psalm 80.

| # | Hebrew | English | Greek |
|---|---|---|---|
| (Note: In the Jewish verse numbering, the ascription of this psalm is verse 1, and the rest of the psalm begins from verse 2. However, the Christian verse numbering does not count the ascription.) | לַמְנַצֵּ֬חַ ׀ עַֽל־הַגִּתִּ֬ית לְאָסָֽף׃ | (To the chief Musician upon Gittith, A Psalm of Asaph.) | Εἰς τὸ τέλος, ὑπὲρ τῶν ληνῶν· ψαλμὸς τῷ ᾿Ασάφ. - |
| 1 | הַ֭רְנִינוּ לֵאלֹהִ֣ים עוּזֵּ֑נוּ הָ֝רִ֗יעוּ לֵאלֹהֵ֥י יַעֲקֹֽב׃ | Sing aloud unto God our strength: make a joyful noise unto the God of Jacob. | ΑΓΑΛΛΙΑΣΘΕ τῷ Θεῷ τῷ βοηθῷ ἡμῶν, ἀλαλάξατε τῷ Θεῷ ᾿Ιακώβ· |
| 2 | שְֽׂאוּ־זִ֭מְרָה וּתְנוּ־תֹ֑ף כִּנּ֖וֹר נָעִ֣ים עִם־נָֽבֶל׃ | Take a psalm, and bring hither the timbrel, the pleasant harp with the psaltery. | λάβετε ψαλμὸν καὶ δότε τύμπανον, ψαλτήριον τερπνὸν μετὰ κιθάρας· |
| 3 | תִּקְע֣וּ בַחֹ֣דֶשׁ שׁוֹפָ֑ר בַּ֝כֵּ֗סֶה לְי֣וֹם חַגֵּֽנוּ׃ | Blow up the trumpet in the new moon, in the time appointed, on our solemn feast day. | σαλπίσατε ἐν νεομηνίᾳ σάλπιγγι, ἐν εὐσήμῳ ἡμέρᾳ ἑορτῆς ὑμῶν· |
| 4 | כִּ֤י חֹ֣ק לְיִשְׂרָאֵ֣ל ה֑וּא מִ֝שְׁפָּ֗ט לֵאלֹהֵ֥י יַעֲקֹֽב׃ | For this was a statute for Israel, and a law of the God of Jacob. | ὅτι πρόσταγμα τῷ ᾿Ισραήλ ἐστι καὶ κρῖμα τῷ Θεῷ ᾿Ιακώβ. |
| 5 | עֵד֤וּת ׀ בִּיה֘וֹסֵ֤ף שָׂמ֗וֹ בְּ֭צֵאתוֹ עַל־אֶ֣רֶץ מִצְרָ֑יִם שְׂפַ֖ת לֹא־יָדַ֣עְתִּי אֶשְׁמָֽע׃ | This he ordained in Joseph for a testimony, when he went out through the land of Egypt: where I heard a language that I understood not. | μαρτύριον ἐν τῷ ᾿Ιωσὴφ ἔθετο αὐτὸν ἐν τῷ ἐξελθεῖν αὐτὸν ἐκ γῆς Αἰγύπτου· γλῶσσαν, ἣν οὐκ ἔγνω, ἤκουσεν· |
| 6 | הֲסִיר֣וֹתִי מִסֵּ֣בֶל שִׁכְמ֑וֹ כַּ֝פָּ֗יו מִדּ֥וּד תַּעֲבֹֽרְנָה׃ | I removed his shoulder from the burden: his hands were delivered from the pots. | ἀπέστησεν ἀπὸ ἄρσεων τὸν νῶτον αὐτοῦ, αἱ χεῖρες αὐτοῦ ἐν τῷ κοφίνῳ ἐδούλευσαν. |
| 7 | בַּצָּרָ֥ה קָרָ֗אתָ וָאֲחַ֫לְּצֶ֥ךָּ אֶ֭עֶנְךָ בְּסֵ֣תֶר רַ֑עַם אֶבְחׇנְךָ֨ עַל־מֵ֖י מְרִיבָ֣ה סֶֽלָה׃ | Thou calledst in trouble, and I delivered thee; I answered thee in the secret place of thunder: I proved thee at the waters of Meribah. Selah. | ἐν θλίψει ἐπεκαλέσω με, καὶ ἐρρυσάμην σε· ἐπήκουσά σου ἐν ἀποκρύφῳ καταιγίδος, ἐδοκίμασά σε ἐπὶ ὕδατος ἀντιλογίας. (διάψαλμα). |
| 8 | שְׁמַ֣ע עַ֭מִּי וְאָעִ֣ידָה בָּ֑ךְ יִ֝שְׂרָאֵ֗ל אִם־תִּֽשְׁמַֽע־לִֽי׃ | Hear, O my people, and I will testify unto thee: O Israel, if thou wilt hearken unto me; | ἄκουσον, λαός μου, καὶ διαμαρτύρομαί σοι, ᾿Ισραήλ, ἐὰν ἀκούσῃς μου, |
| 9 | לֹא־יִהְיֶ֣ה בְ֭ךָ אֵ֣ל זָ֑ר וְלֹ֥א תִ֝שְׁתַּחֲוֶ֗ה לְאֵ֣ל נֵכָֽר׃ | There shall no strange god be in thee; neither shalt thou worship any strange god. | οὐκ ἔσται ἐν σοὶ Θεὸς πρόσφατος, οὐδὲ προσκυνήσεις Θεῷ ἀλλοτρίῳ· |
| 10 | אָֽנֹכִ֨י ׀ יְ֘הֹוָ֤ה אֱלֹהֶ֗יךָ הַֽ֭מַּעַלְךָ מֵאֶ֣רֶץ מִצְרָ֑יִם הַרְחֶב־פִּ֝֗יךָ וַאֲמַלְאֵֽהוּ׃ | I am the LORD thy God, which brought thee out of the land of Egypt: open thy mouth wide, and I will fill it. | ἐγὼ γάρ εἰμι Κύριος ὁ Θεός σου ὁ ἀναγαγών σε ἐκ γῆς Αἰγύπτου· πλάτυνον τὸ στόμα σου, καὶ πληρώσω αὐτό. |
| 11 | וְלֹֽא־שָׁמַ֣ע עַמִּ֣י לְקוֹלִ֑י וְ֝יִשְׂרָאֵ֗ל לֹא־אָ֥בָה לִֽי׃ | But my people would not hearken to my voice; and Israel would none of me. | καὶ οὐκ ἤκουσεν ὁ λαός μου τῆς φωνῆς μου, καὶ ᾿Ισραὴλ οὐ προσέσχε μοι· |
| 12 | וָ֭אֲשַׁלְּחֵהוּ בִּשְׁרִיר֣וּת לִבָּ֑ם יֵ֝לְכ֗וּ בְּֽמוֹעֲצ֖וֹתֵיהֶֽם׃ | So I gave them up unto their own hearts' lust: and they walked in their own counsels. | καὶ ἐξαπέστειλα αὐτοὺς κατὰ τὰ ἐπιτηδεύματα τῶν καρδιῶν αὐτῶν, πορεύσονται ἐν τοῖς ἐπιτηδεύμασιν αὐτῶν. |
| 13 | וּ עַ֭מִּי שֹׁמֵ֣עַֽ לִ֑י יִ֝שְׂרָאֵ֗ל בִּדְרָכַ֥י יְהַלֵּֽכוּ׃ | Oh that my people had hearkened unto me, and Israel had walked in my ways! | εἰ ὁ λαός μου ἤκουσέ μου, ᾿Ισραὴλ ταῖς ὁδοῖς μου εἰ ἐπορεύθη, |
| 14 | כִּ֭מְעַט אוֹיְבֵיהֶ֣ם אַכְנִ֑יעַ וְעַ֥ל צָ֝רֵיהֶ֗ם אָשִׁ֥יב יָדִֽי׃ | I should soon have subdued their enemies, and turned my hand against their adversaries. | ἐν τῷ μηδενὶ ἂν τοὺς ἐχθροὺς αὐτῶν ἐταπείνωσα καὶ ἐπὶ τοὺς θλίβοντας αὐτοὺς ἐπέβαλον ἂν τὴν χεῖρά μου. |
| 15 | מְשַׂנְאֵ֣י יְ֭הֹוָה יְכַחֲשׁוּ־ל֑וֹ וִיהִ֖י עִתָּ֣ם לְעוֹלָֽם׃ | The haters of the LORD should have submitted themselves unto him: but their time should have endured for ever. | οἱ ἐχθροὶ Κυρίου ἐψεύσαντο αὐτῷ, καὶ ἔσται ὁ καιρὸς αὐτῶν εἰς τὸν αἰῶνα. |
| 16 | וַֽ֭יַּאֲכִילֵהוּ מֵחֵ֣לֶב חִטָּ֑ה וּ֝מִצּ֗וּר דְּבַ֣שׁ אַשְׂבִּיעֶֽךָ׃ | He should have fed them also with the finest of the wheat: and with honey out of the rock should I have satisfied thee. | καὶ ἐψώμισεν αὐτοὺς ἐκ στέατος πυροῦ καὶ ἐκ πέτρας μέλι ἐχόρτασεν αὐτούς. |
