= Petronella Moens =

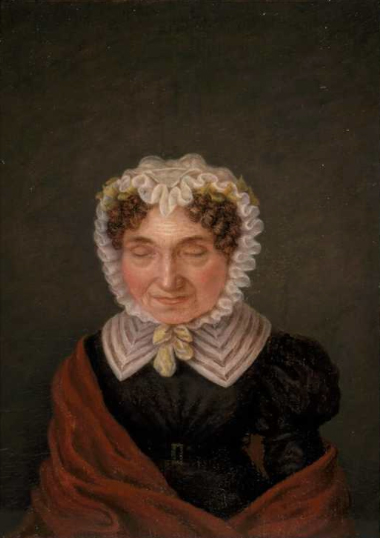
- Portrait of Petronella Moens (1820/1824) by Margaretha Cornelia Boellaard
- Born: 16 November 1762; Kûbaard
- Died: 4 January 1843 (aged 80); Utrecht
- Occupation: Writer

Petronella Moens (16 November 1762 – 4 January 1843) was a blind Dutch writer, editor, and feminist. She managed a paper in 1788–1797, in which she spoke for political issues such as slavery and women suffrage.

== Biography ==
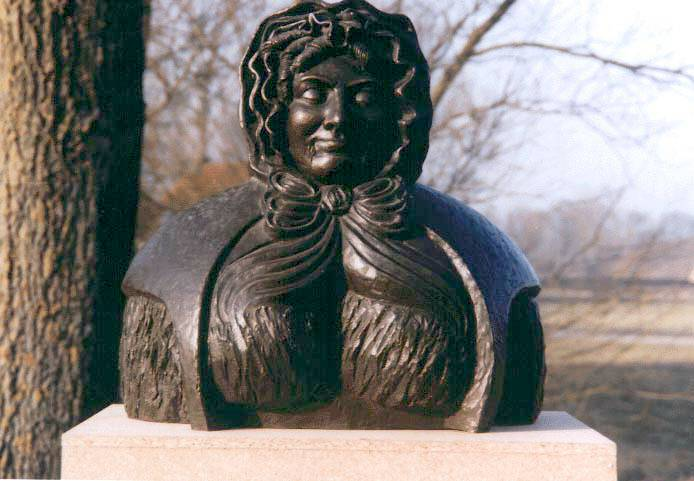
Bust of Moens in Aardenburg

Petronella Moens was born on 16 November 1762 in Kûbaard, the Netherlands, the third child of Petrus Moens, a pastor, and Maria Lycklama à Nijeholt and grew up in Ossendrecht and Aardenburg. Moens's mother died in 1769 while giving birth to her sister Baukje. That same year, Moens contracted smallpox while staying in IJzendijke and was struck blind. Despite her disability, she would write dozens of poems and books, such as Songbook for the Churches and its 432 songs. In 1785, she received a gold medal from the Amsteldamsch Dicht- en Letterlievend Genootschap for her poem De waare christian and would by the end of her life possess ten such awards.

== See also ==
- List of women printers and publishers before 1800
