= Shir shel yom =

Jewish prayer of a chapter of Psalms

Shir Shel Yom (שִׁיר שֶׁל יוֹם), meaning "'song' [i.e. Psalm] of [the] day [of the week]" consists of one psalm recited daily at the end of the Jewish morning prayer services known as shacharit; in the Italian rite they are recited also at Mincha and before Birkat Hamazon. Each day of the week possesses a distinct psalm that is referred to by its Hebrew name as the shir shel yom and each day's shir shel yom is a different paragraph of Psalms.

Although fundamentally similar to the Levite's song that was sung at the Holy Temple in Jerusalem in ancient times, there are some differences between the two.

== Songs for the days of the week ==
- Sunday: Psalm 24
- Monday: Psalm 48.
- Tuesday: Psalm 82.
- Wednesday: Psalm 94, followed (in many communities) by the first or first three verses of Psalm 95.
- Thursday: Psalm 81.
- Friday: Psalm 93.
- Saturday: Psalm 92.

== Rationale ==
Each day's shir shel yom was chosen for its ties to that day's significance in the week of Creation, as explained by the Baraita that quotes Rabbi Yehuda in the name of Rabbi Akiva:

- On Sunday, Psalm 24 ("For God is the land and its fullness...") is recited, in reference to the first day of Creation, on which God acquired the universe, bequeathed it to mankind and ruled over His world by Himself.
- On Monday, Psalm 48 ("Great is God and much praised...") is recited, in reference to the second day of Creation, on which He separated the things that he made (the heavens from the earth) and reigned over them.
- On Tuesday, Psalm 82 ("God stands in the divine assembly...") is recited, in reference to the third day of Creation, on which He exposed the land with His wisdom, thus preparing the world for His assembly.
- On Wednesday, Psalm 94 ("Hashem is a God of vengeance...") is recited, in reference to the fourth day of Creation, on which He created the sun and the moon and how he will ultimately exact punishment from those who worship them.
- On Thursday, Psalm 81 ("Sing joyously to the God of our might...") is recited, in reference to the fifth day of Creation, on which He created the birds and the fish to give praise to his name.
- On Friday, Psalm 93 ("Hashem has reigned, he had donned grandeur...") is recited, in reference to the sixth day of Creation, on which He completed his work and reigned over his creations.
- On the Sabbath, Psalm 92 ("A song, a hymn for the Sabbath day") is recited, in reference to the seventh day of Creation, which is a day that is entirely Sabbath.

The Zohar provides an alternative rationale, linking the seven psalms to seven 1000-year periods. Contemporary scholar Dr Rachel Reich finds logic in the style of the Psalms: the psalm for the first day has "God" in its first (Hebrew) word, the psalm for the second day has "God" in its second word, and so on.

== Other days ==
On holidays, including Chol Hamoed and Rosh Chodesh, the Levites would replace the regular song with one appropriate to the day. However, it is customary to recite only the standard song after Shacharit. The exception being that followers of the Vilna Gaon, including most Nusach Ashkenaz communities in Jerusalem recite all of the special songs for special days instead of the regular Psalms. On Rosh Chodesh, however, most congregations who do not follow the practices of the Gaon recite the special song (Psalm 104) after the regular shir shel yom. Since in the times of the Temple, the song for the Sabbath would override any other song, many do not recite Psalm 104 if Rosh Chodesh falls out on the Sabbath, although many others do; the Vilna Gaon and others would recite each holiday instead of the regular weekday Psalm.
