= Gittith =

Biblical musical term

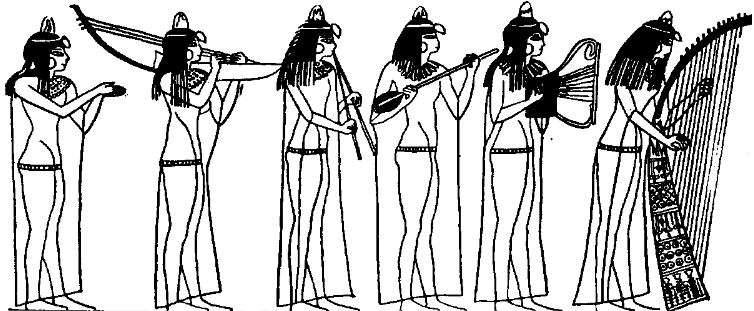
- An Ancient Egyptian band carrying several types of harps and lyres, instruments similar to what a gittith is proposed to be
- Classification: String instrument

Related instruments
- Lyre, Kinnor, Nevel (instrument)

A gittith (Hebrew: גתית) is a musical term of uncertain meaning found in the Bible, most likely referring to a type of musical instrument.

== Mention in the Bible ==
The term "gittith" is used only three times in the Bible: at the beginnings of Psalm 8, Psalm 81, and Psalm 84. These psalms open with "למנצח על-הגיתית" (“for the Leader, upon the gittith”), a direction to the chief musician. Further elaboration or explanation of the meaning of the word is not given.

== Later exegesis ==
Rashi cites Menahem ben Saruq in his claim that a gittith is a type of musical instrument. He then connects the term gittith to the city of Gath, meaning that a gittith would have been made by a Gittite, or a person from Gath. In 1 Samuel 21, David stays with Achish, king of Gath, and could be understood to have taken back with him a musical instrument from Gath.

Ibn Ezra makes a similar connection, explaining a gittith to be an instrument made for the Levite descendents of Obed-Edom, who was a Gittite. However, he also explains that the Psalms opening with למנצח על-הגיתית (“for the Leader, upon the gittith”) are meant to be sung to a tune of a then-popular song opening with the words "the Gittite boasts" (הגתית מתפארת).

Strong's Concordance lists 'gittith' as its 1665th entry, defining it as a Gittite harp. Brown–Driver–Briggs translates 'gittith' directly to mean a type of lyre.

=== Link to winepresses in Christian and Jewish sources ===
The Septuagint translates על-הגיתית (“upon the gittith”) as hyper ton lenon, or “for/on the winepresses”, based on the Hebrew גת (‘winepress’). It is possible that this translation comes from the replacement of גתית with גתות, which would indeed be the normative plural of גת. Ibn Ezra rejects this notion explicitly, referring to it as מהבלים (emptiness, vapidity). Most likely independent of the Septuagint, much rabbinical commentary in Midrash Tehillim also interprets gittith to refer to winepresses.

The 19th-century German rabbi Samson Raphael Hirsch also held this interpretation, and viewed the act of treading grapes to reflect the idea of divine afflictions as an aid to moral development, as similar pressure and destruction is needed to extract the juice from the grapes. He goes on to link this to the content of the three psalms using the introduction על-הגיתית, maintaining that all three of the psalms with this introduction are related to the concept of ennoblement in response to catastrophe.

== Modern interpretations ==
It has been suggested in several Bible translations that psalms starting with the same designations (here, על-הגיתית) were intended to have similar tunes. However, this has been claimed to be made less probable by the lack of similarity in the meters of the psalms starting with על-הגיתית, as Psalms 8 and 81 differ markedly in their meters.

Artist and academic Moshe Frumin created reconstructions of several Biblical instruments, including a gittith, which were displayed at the Sherwin Miller Museum of Jewish Art in Tulsa, Oklahoma.

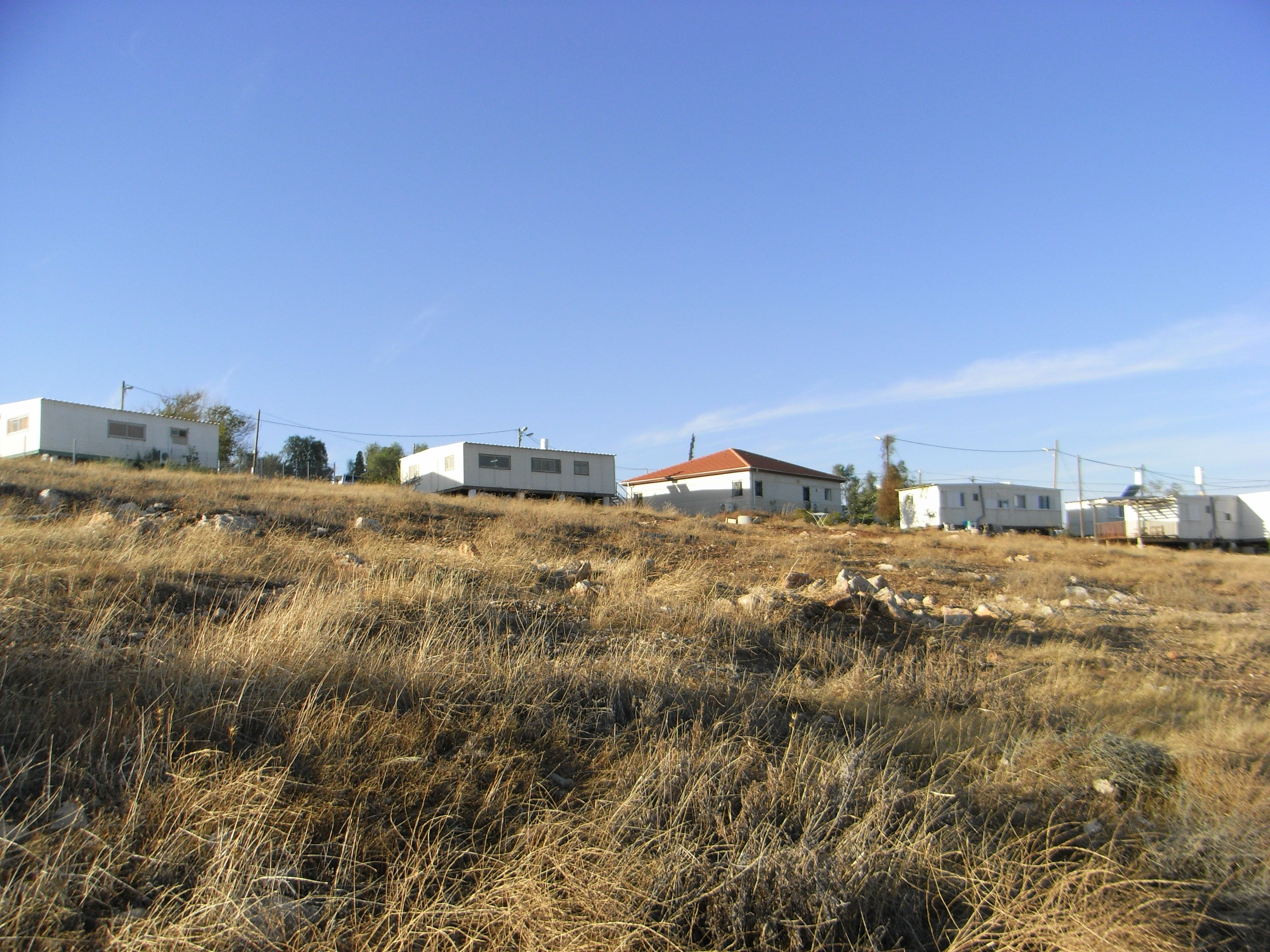
Moshav Gitit

== Other usage ==
The moshav of Gitit, established in 1972, was named after the gittith due to the shape of the area, which was considered to resemble that of the musical instrument.

The word Gittit has also gained some usage as an Israeli girls’ name.

== See also ==
- History of religious Jewish music
- History of music in the biblical period
- Kinnor
