= Gitit (Israeli settlement) =

Israeli settlement in the West Bank

Gitit: גִּתִּית, גיתית (Hebrew)
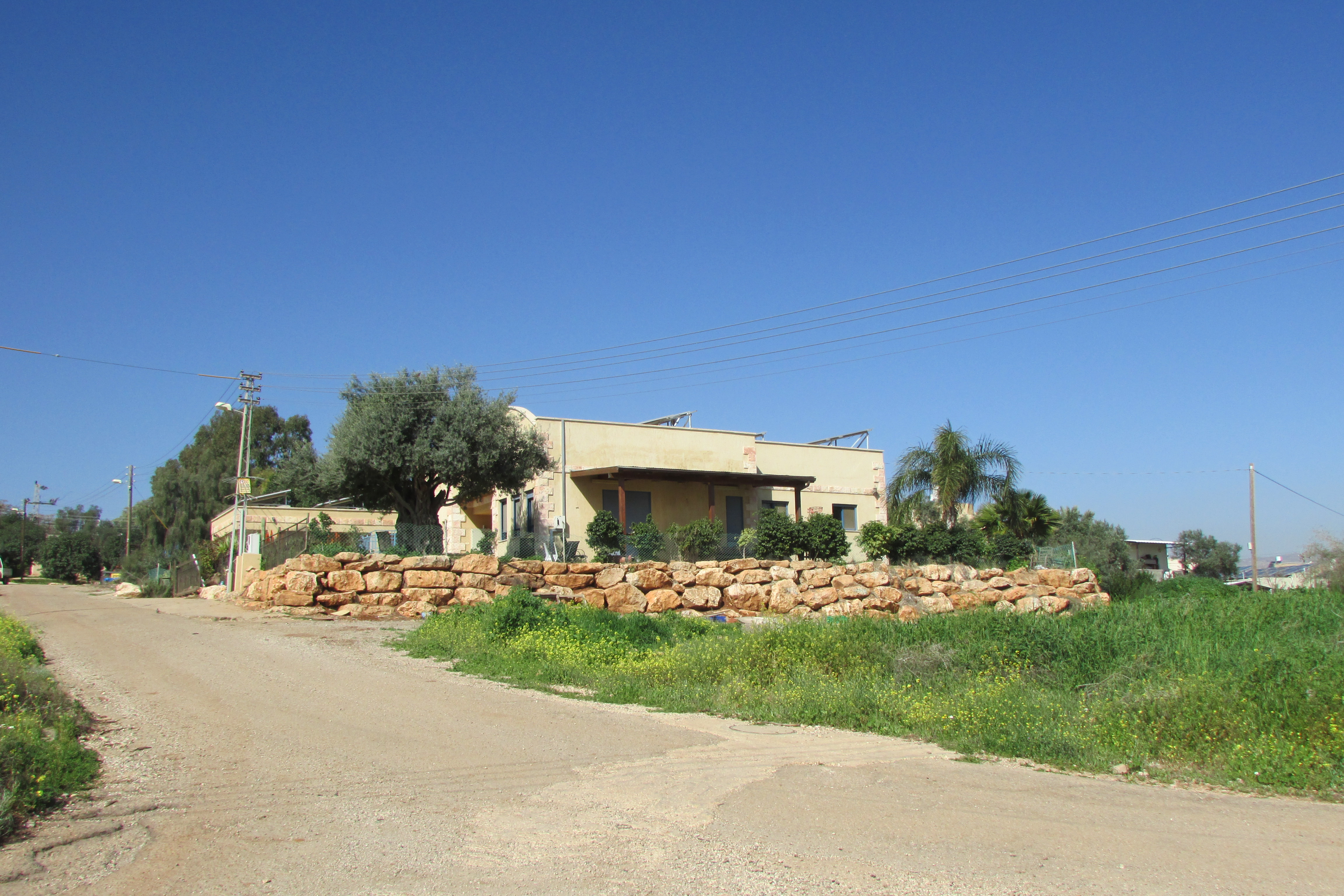

- Location within the Northern West Bank
- Coordinates: 32°6′3.82″N 35°23′45.59″E
- Country: Israel
- District: Judea and Samaria Area
- Council: Bik'at HaYarden
- Region: West Bank
- Affiliation: Mishkei Herut Beitar
- Founded: 1972
- Founder: Nahal
- Population (2024): 600
- Website: www.gittit.co.il

Gitit (Hebrew: גִּתִּית) is an Israeli settlement in the West Bank, organized as a moshav. Located in the Jordan Valley with an area of 1,500 dunams (1.5 km^{2}; 0.58 sq mi), it falls under the jurisdiction of Bik'at HaYarden Regional Council. In 2024 it had a population of 600.

The international community considers Israeli settlements in the West Bank illegal under international law, but the Israeli government disputes this.

== History ==
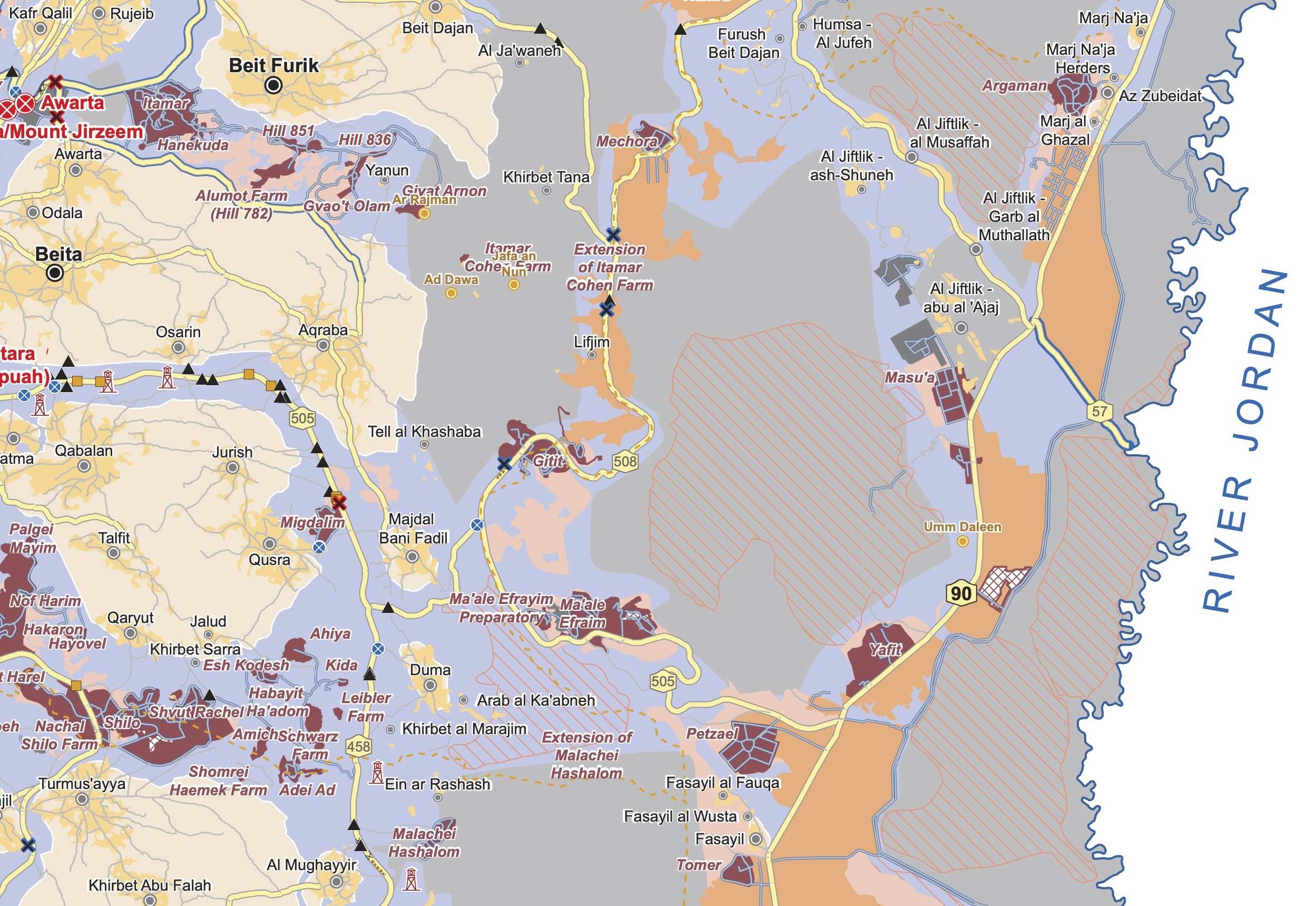
Gitit settlement in an OCHA oPt map, May 2023

According to ARIJ, Israel confiscated 514 dunams of land from the Palestinian village of Al-Jiftlik in order to construct Gitit in addition to 1,085 dunums from Aqraba for Gitit and Itamar.

After the decision to establish a settlement had been made, land was seized from Aqraba first by declaring a closed military area. When the Palestinian owners refused to vacate the area, their tools were sabotaged. Finally, a crop-duster was used to spray the area with poison, in a joint operation approved by the government of Golda Meir in April 1972, involving the IDF and the Jewish Agency. The village was then established in 1972 as a Nahal settlement. It is named for a musical instrument mentioned in the Bible with a similar shape as the area: f.e. Psalm 8:1.

In 1975 it became a civilian community affiliated with Mishkei Herut Beitar. In 1978 it became a moshav shitufi, but later reverted to moshav ovdim status.
