= Kûbaard =

Kûbaard Kubaard
- Village
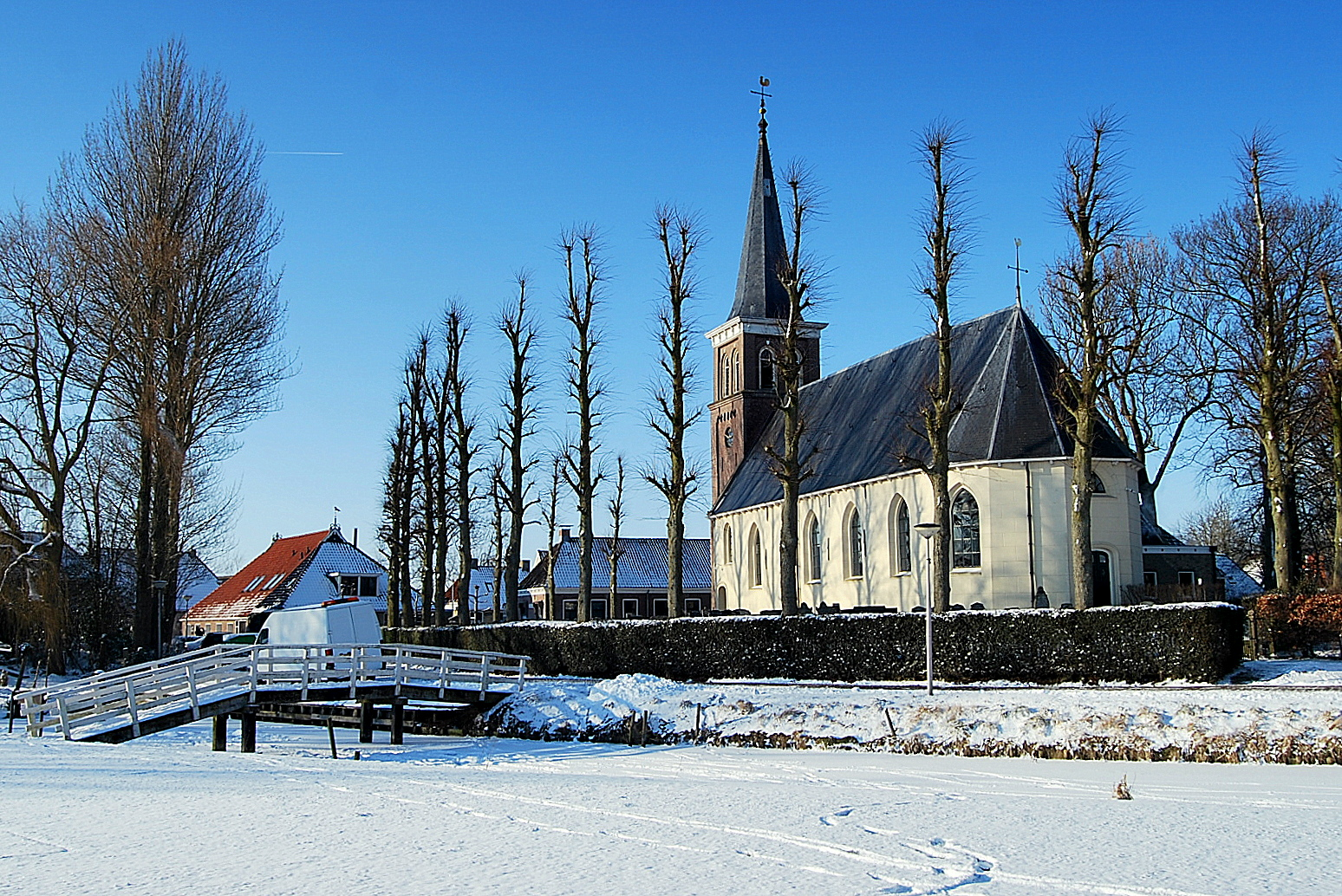
- View of Kûbaard in winter

- Flag Coat of arms

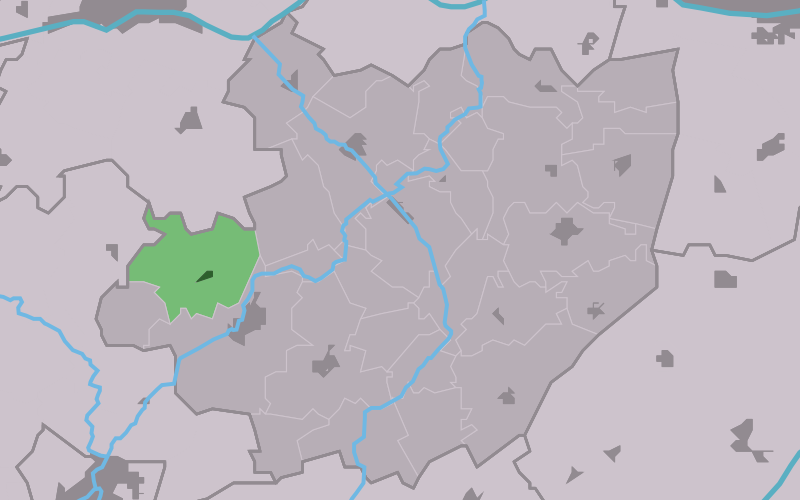
- Location in the former Littenseradiel municipality

- Location in the Netherlands Kûbaard (Netherlands)
- Country: Netherlands
- Province: Friesland
- Municipality: Súdwest-Fryslân

Area
  - Total: 0.38 km^{2} (0.15 sq mi)
- Elevation: 0.2 m (0.66 ft)

Population (2021)
  - Total: 165
  - Density: 430/km^{2} (1,100/sq mi)
- Time zone: UTC+1 (CET)
  - Summer (DST): UTC+2 (CEST)
- Postal code: 8732
- Dialing code: 0515

Kûbaard (Dutch: Kubaard) is a village located in the municipal Súdwest-Fryslân in the province of Friesland, the Netherlands. It had a population around 242 inhabitants in January 2017.

== History ==
The village was first mentioned in the second half of the 13th century as Cubawerth, and means "terp of Cuba (person)". Kûbaard is a terp (artificial dwelling mound). Later a dike which meanders through the landscape was built and still provides the main road to the village.

The church in Kubaard was built in 1644, but has elements from before 1200. The pipe organ was installed in 1856 by Willem Hardoff. Now electrified, it once was powered by foot power, providing air to the bellows to the individual pipes as required by the organist. Although the organ would be considered small by today's standards, it more than adequately fills the church. It was renovated in 2017 by the Dutch organ firm Bakker & Timmenga.

In the late 19th century, the Doleantie (schism in the Dutch Reformed church) lead to the formation of the Reformed Church. In 1890, a shed in a farm was transformed into a church, and was one of the smallest churches of the Netherlands. In 1966, the church closed and is now a residential home.

Kûbaard was home to 328 people in 1840. Before 2018, the village was part of the Littenseradiel municipality and before 1984 it belonged to Hennaarderadeel municipality.

== Gallery ==
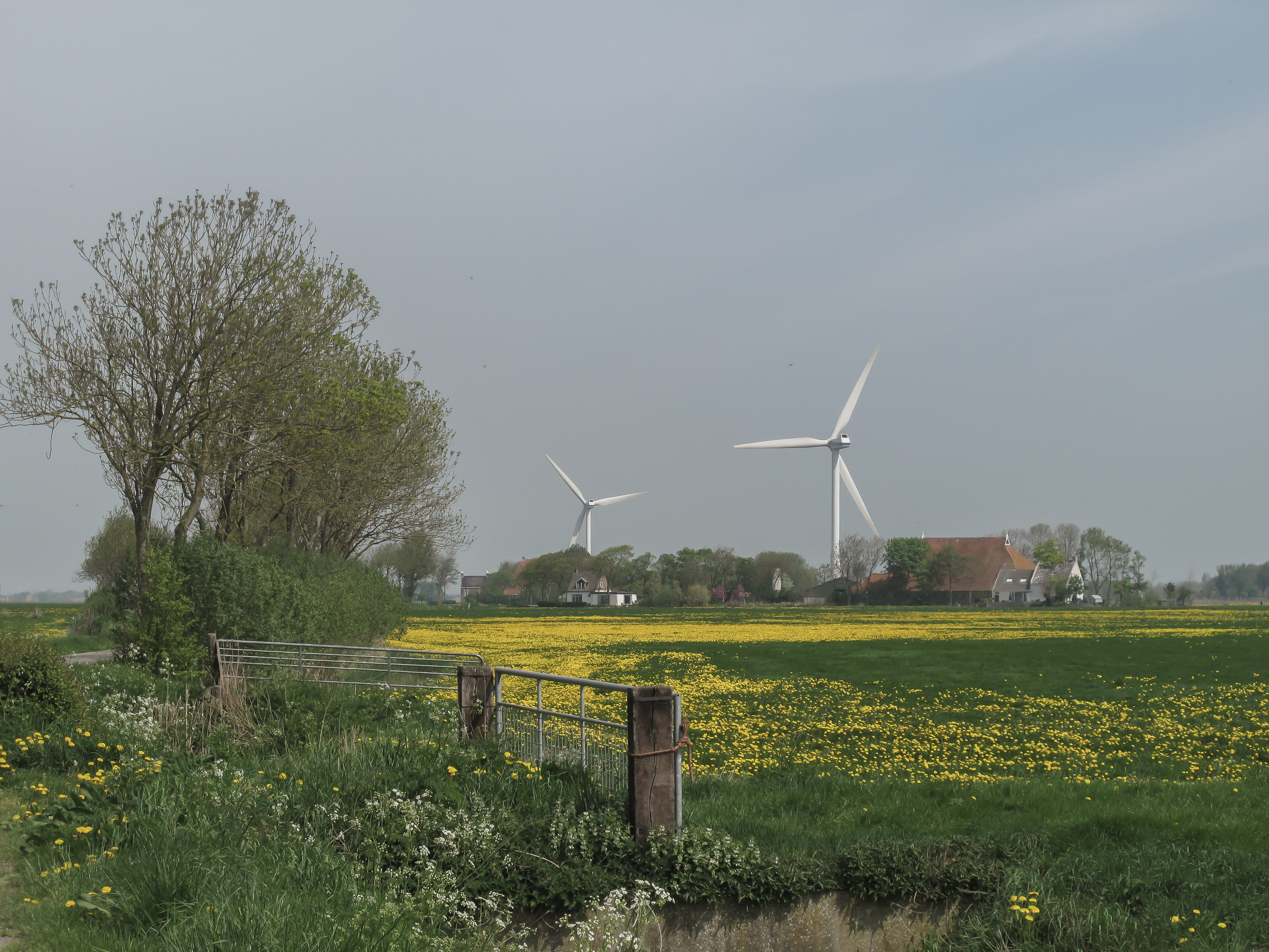
Panorama between Kûbaard and Spannum

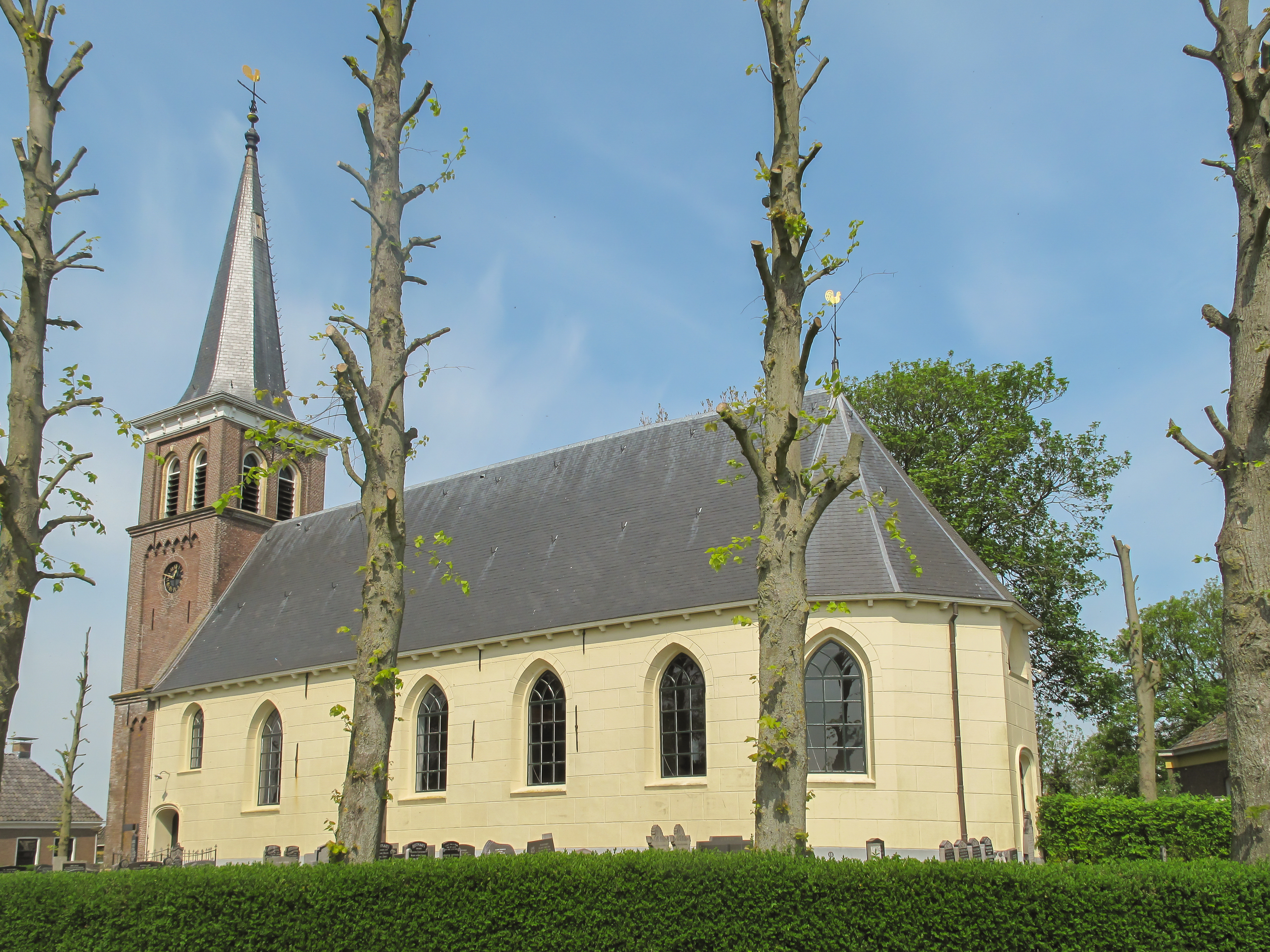
church Kûbaard

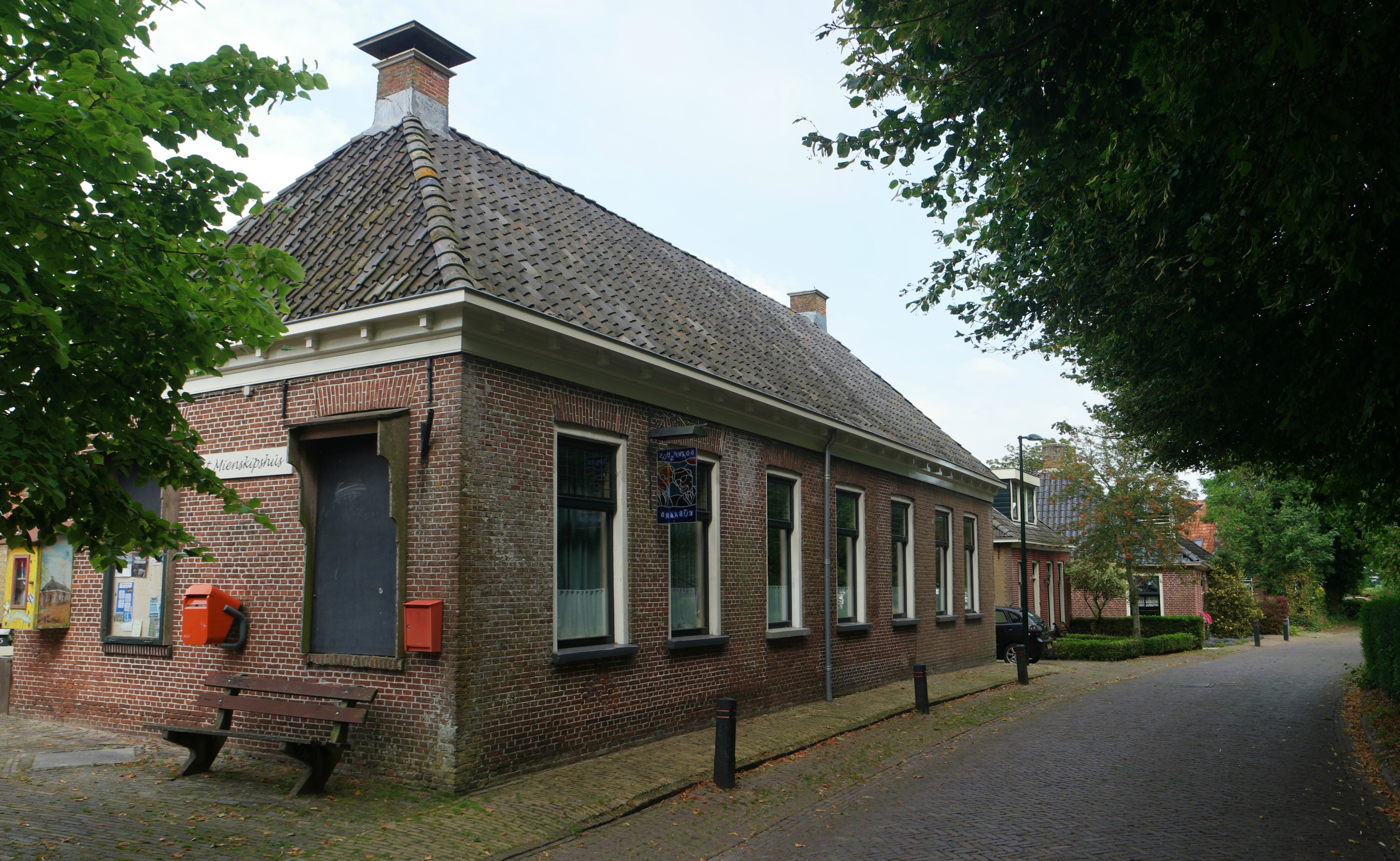
Community centre
