= Psalms of Asaph =

Twelve psalms in the Book of Psalms

The Psalms of Asaph (English: /ˈeɪ.sæf/ Ay-saf; Hebrew: אָסָף ’Āsāp̄, "Gather") are the twelve psalms numbered as 50 and 73–83 in the Masoretic Text, and as 49 and 72–82 in the Septuagint and the Vulgate. They are located in the Book of Psalms in the Hebrew Bible (which is also called the Old Testament). Scholars have determined that a psalm's attribution to Asaph can mean a variety of things. It could mean that the psalms were a part of a collection from the Asaphites, a name commonly used to identify temple singers. Another possibility is that the psalms were performed in the style or tradition of the guild bearing Asaph's name. Asaph is said to either be the author or the transcriber of these psalms. He may not have said these psalms but transcribed the words of David. No specific time period is known to be associated with these Psalms, but the record of destruction noted in Psalm 74 may indicate that these Psalms came from the post-exilic period.

== Identity of Asaph ==
In the Hebrew Bible, three men have the name of Asaph. Asaph is identified with the twelve Psalms and is said to be the son of Berechiah who is said to be an ancestor of the Asaphites. The Asaphites were one of the guilds of musicians in the First Temple. This information is clarified in the Books of Chronicles. In Chronicles, it is said that Asaph was a descendant of Gershon the son of Levi and he is identified as a member of the Levites. He is also known as one of the three Levites commissioned by David to be in charge of singing in the house of Yahweh (see below). In 1 Chronicles 6:16–32 David appoints a man named Heman as the main musician or singer and Asaph as Heman's right-hand assistant and the Merarites at his left hand. Asaph is also credited with performing at the dedication of Solomon's temple in 2 Chronicles 5:12.

As an officer within the Jerusalem religious system, Asaph would have participated in both the public and private side of that system. He served as an official for several years, starting with King David and serving King Solomon as well, if he is the same Asaph mentioned in 2 Chronicles 5:12. During his long term, Asaph saw the best and worst of other officials. His complaint against corruption among the rich and influential, recorded in Psalm 73 (MT) / Psalm 72 (LXX), might have been directed towards some of those officials. The words he used to describe the wicked come from the same lexicon of words used by officers of the cultic/sacrificial system.

== Context and meaning ==
Each psalm has a separate meaning and the psalms cannot be summarized as a whole. Across the twelve psalms exists a theme of the judgment from God and how the people of the Bible must follow the Law of God. According to Hermann Gunkel, there are many genres of Psalms including: Hymns, Communal Laments, Individual Laments, Individual Song of Thanksgiving, Wisdom Poems, Pilgrimage Songs and Liturgies. Several of the Psalms of Asaph are categorized as communal laments because they are concerned for the well being of a whole community of people. Communal laments encompass a description of some sort of severe destruction followed by a cry out to God for help and a reference to his great mercy of the past. The communal laments are different from the individual laments because of the use of "we" versus the use of "I." The psalms are filled with thanksgiving and praise towards God.

Many of these psalms forecast destruction or devastation in the future for their tribes but are balanced with God’s mercy and saving power for the people.

Some of the Psalms of Asaph are not labeled as only from Asaph but as "for the leader." Some interpret this to mean that they were written to be read by an oracle and proclaimed in front of a large audience, or simply that it was a cue to the lead singer or chief musician.

Another characteristic to these psalms is the use of the word "selah" which has been interpreted many ways. One way to interpret it is as a direction for the cantor or musician and another is to see it as a signal for a pause. The exact definition or derivation is not known; it occurs 71 times in 39 Psalms.

== Elohist psalms ==
This section of the book of Psalms is part of a section known as the Elohist psalms. Psalms 42–83 are referred to as Elohistic because the name "Yahweh" (which according to Jewish Orthodoxy is a corruption of the "unpronounceable" Name) is avoided and the term "Elohim" is used instead. The Elohistic psalms are divided into three subdivisions:

MT	LXX and Vulg.	
42–49	41–48	are "of the sons of Korah"
51–65, 68–71	50–64, 67–70	are "of David"
50, 73–83	49, 72–82	are "of Asaph"

== Psalms of Asaph ==
=== Psalm 50 (MT) / Psalm 49 (LXX and Vulg.) ===
This Psalm forecasts the judgment to come and the manifestation of God. It speaks of God asking to be acknowledged as judge and creator and promising to bestow mercy on those who turn to him. It ends with a threat followed by a promise. The Psalm addresses those who have made a covenant with God through sacrifice. God does not have a problem with the sacrifices—they are being offered diligently. Yet, the people are forgetting God through their conduct. The Psalm tells us that sacrificial actions by themselves are not sufficient. God rebukes the people for not obeying him. In fact, the focus is on the "offering of thanksgiving" rather than the offering of burnt offerings. Ethics and attitude matter to this God, not merely sacrifices. This is a significant theological statement. The nation had focused on the prescribed offerings, yet had neglected a real connection or devotion to God. This psalm points the reader or hearer towards offering thanksgiving and a life of devotion as the correct way of approach to God, rather than burnt offerings alone. Some feel this Psalm, which is a type of judicial indictment, was moved to immediately precede Psalm 51, a plea for mercy, rather than being with the other 11 Psalms of Asaph which appear in Book 3 of Psalms as Psalms 73 to 83.

=== Psalm 73 (MT) / Psalm 72 (LXX and Vulg.) ===
Divine providence and the internal battle within one's soul are the two main themes of this psalm. It speaks of the journey of self-realization about the evils around the world but also coming back and realizing the plan of God.

Psalm 73 deals with how the righteous are to respond to corruption within the ranks of wealth, power and influence. Initially, the good man or woman is scandalized by the revelation that leaders are abusing the power of their privileges. But as Asaph reflects on the nature of God, he comes to understand that even the most powerful authority figures, if corrupt and unchanged (unrepentant), will receive their reward at the hands of the Lord. Asaph might have witnessed corruption within the ranks of the officials of the Temple.

In this Psalm, Asaph questions why the wicked seem to prosper. Asaph goes into the sanctuary where sacrifices are held and gains a new perspective. Asaph observes God's judgement of evil and accepts this from God.

=== Psalm 74 (MT) / Psalm 73 (LXX and Vulg.) ===
The theme of this psalm revolves around the first verse "Why, God, have you cast us off forever?" and forecasts destruction. It comes across as a cry out to God as to when salvation will come and save them from the depths of their despair. Amidst the cries of despair, a voice of praise to God also comes through.

Psalm 74, historically, is written as a community lament of the Jewish people in reference to the Babylonian Captivity. The enemy had damaged everything in the sanctuary and destroyed the temples of God in the land. Because of the great time between the building (1000 BC) and the destruction (586 BC) of the first temple we know that this psalm isn’t written by David’s Asaph who was the one of three temple singers assigned by King David to the temple. The Asaph of this psalm wonders why God's anger has allowed this invasion and destruction.

=== Psalm 75 (MT) / Psalm 74 (LXX and Vulg.) ===
The laments of the people are voiced here and their promise to sing the praises of God at all times is established. This Psalm is labeled as a song or psalm to the leader, interpreted as the chief musician or leader of the community. The leader ends the psalm with a statement about the wicked being humbled and the righteous being exalted.

=== Psalm 76 (MT) / Psalm 75 (LXX and Vulg.) ===
This psalm focuses on elaborating on the incredible saving power of God. It calls the people to worship and praise God in thanksgiving for his saving power. This Psalm is also recognized as for the leader.

=== Psalm 77 (MT) / Psalm 76 (LXX and Vulg.) ===
This Psalm is a psalm of lament from a community of people crying out to God and asking him to not be silent in their time of need. The question "Will God let his created people be destroyed?" is posed. It comes full circle with the end proclaiming the wonder of God as creator and reflecting on his care of Moses and Aaron.

=== Psalm 78 (MT) / Psalm 77 (LXX and Vulg.) ===
This psalm urges people to follow the law and meant to show the people of the time the pattern of God’s saving mercy. It encourages the passing down from generation to generation the deeds of God. It reflects specifically on the time of Moses and the Israelites (Hebrews) in the desert.

=== Psalm 79 (MT) / Psalm 78 (LXX and Vulg.) ===
The focus of this psalm is the importance of prayer in the midst of calamities specifically the calamity of the reduction of Jerusalem to ashes by the Babylonian army in 587 BC The lament of the community acknowledges their faults and begs for God's mercy.

=== Psalm 80 (MT) / Psalm 79 (LXX and Vulg.) ===
This psalm is sometimes referred to as a testimony to Asaph and is labeled as "for the leader." It highlights the restoration of the nation through prayer and God's mercy. It combines hope with a memory of great sorrow. The images of Israel as a vineyard and God as a shepherd are both utilized here.

=== Psalm 81 (MT) / Psalm 80 (LXX and Vulg.) ===
This psalm emphasizes praising a God who saves and a national return to liturgical worship. The concept of choosing to act on the desires and wants of humans rather than walking with God and being in his favor is brought to light in this psalm. It also calls for repentance from the people to reorder God's protection upon them.

=== Psalm 82 (MT) / Psalm 81 (LXX and Vulg.) ===
The stress of this psalm is placed on judgment for iniquity, from human judges and from God, and declares the strong bonds between moral and physical order. It comments on the act of God rebuking the kings and unjust human judges of Israel (or gods; it presents the monolatrous view, that God ["Elohim"] is greater than the other gods ["elohim"]) for not treating the poor with respect. This psalm ends with a prayer for justice.

=== Psalm 83 (MT) / Psalm 82 (LXX and Vulg.) ===
The last Asaph psalm and the last Elohistic psalm highlights the lament of the people due to their fear of the invasion and of Israel. However then it reveals how God is in control of all occurrences and prays that the current enemy will be destroyed as all the enemies of the past were destroyed.
