= Psalm 60 =

Sacred song from the Hebrew Bible

- "O God, thou hast cast us off, thou hast scattered us"
- Psalm of communal lament
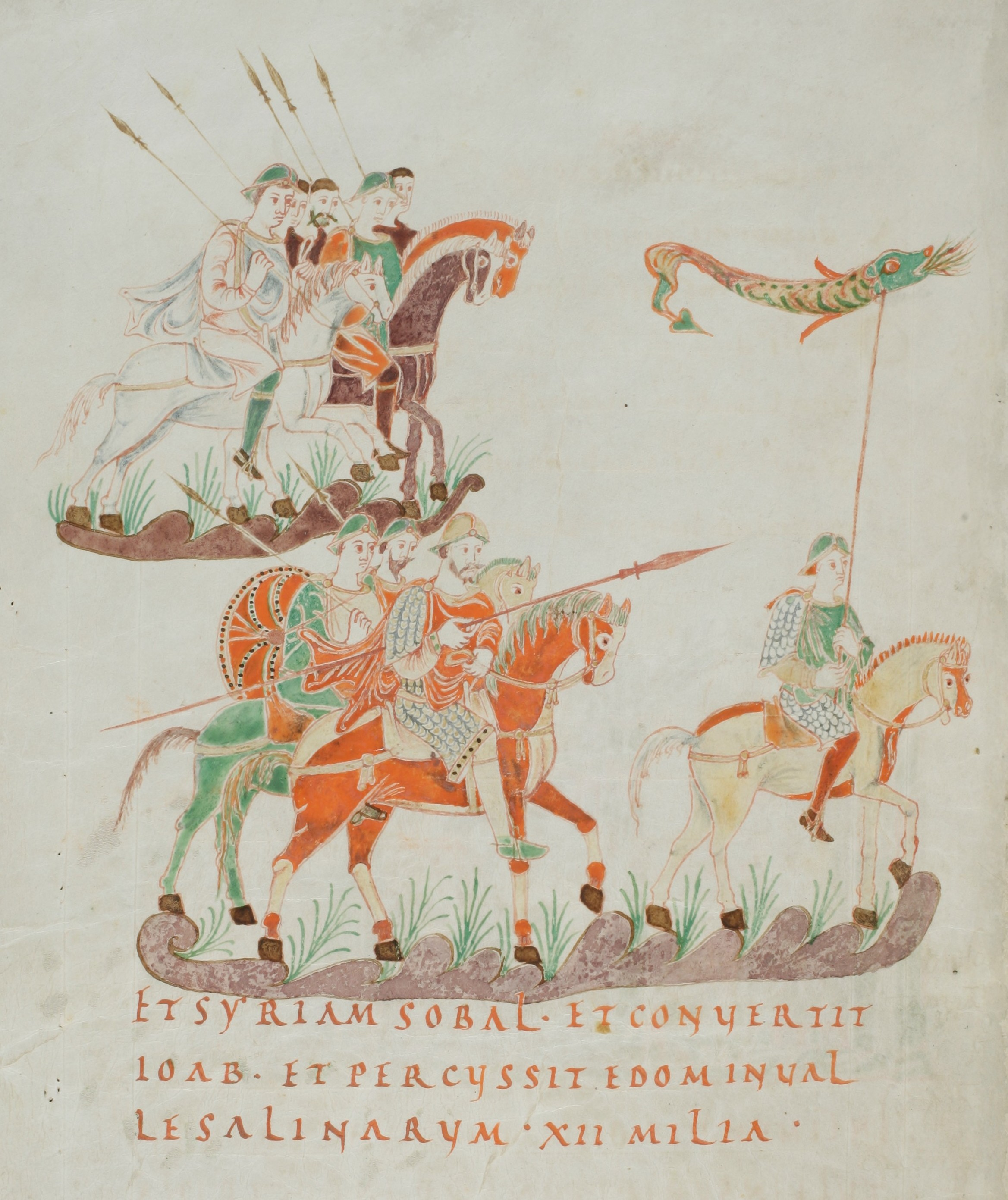
- Depiction of Joab, nephew and general of king David, as cavalry commander (Golden Psalter of St. Gallen, late 9th century)
- Other name: Psalm 59; "Deus reppulisti nos et destruxisti nos"
- Language: Hebrew (original)

Psalm 60
- ← Psalm 59 Psalm 61 →
- Book: Book of Psalms
- Hebrew Bible part: Ketuvim
- Order in the Hebrew part: 1
- Category: Sifrei Emet
- Christian Bible part: Old Testament
- Order in the Christian part: 19

Psalm 60 is the 60th psalm of the Book of Psalms, beginning in English in the King James Version: "O God, thou hast cast us off, thou hast scattered us". In the slightly different numbering system of the Greek Septuagint version of the Bible and the Latin Vulgate, this psalm is Psalm 59. In Latin, it is known as "Deus reppulisti nos et destruxisti nos". It is addressed "to the chief Musician upon Shushan Eduth", referring to the title of a song, presumably identifying the intended melody, mentioned only here and in Psalm 80, and described as "a Michtam of David, when he strove with Aramnaharaim and with Aramzobah, when Joab returned, and smote of Edom in the valley of salt twelve thousand." The heading text in the Revised Standard Version and the New American Bible Revised Edition refers to Aram-Zobah, whereas in the New King James Version the reference is to Zobah. The psalm has been called a psalm of communal lament.

The psalm forms a regular part of Jewish, Catholic, Lutheran, Anglican and other Protestant liturgies. It has been set to music.

== Geographical imagery ==
In verse 8, many writers consider "Moab is my washbowl" to refer to the Dead Sea in the vicinity of Moab, and "Upon Edom I will toss my sandal" is viewed as Edom becoming a humble servant, such as a servant who would clean a master's sandals. Commentaries expressing this view include Albert Barnes' Notes on the Bible, Charles Ellicott's Commentary for English Readers and the Cambridge Bible for Schools and Colleges. Psalm 108 also uses the imagery of tossing a sandal upon Edom. Barnes refers to "an allusion in the expression 'I will cast out my shoe', to the custom, when transferring a possession, of throwing down a shoe on the ground as a symbol of occupancy".

Herod was an Idumean, an Edomite, ruling over the Jews in his day. Some commentators, such as Ray Vander Laan in "In the Shadow of Herod", would view this promise pointing to a victory of the Jews over Edom similar to other promises that Esau (the father of the Idumeans) would serve Jacob and ultimately not fulfilled until Christ.

The "Valley of Salt" is also referred to as the "Valley of Saltpits".

== Uses ==
=== Jewish liturgy ===
In Jewish liturgy, the psalm is recited on Shushan Purim. Verse 7 is part of the closing paragraph of the Amidah.

=== Book of Common Prayer ===
In the Church of England's Book of Common Prayer, this psalm is appointed to be read on the evening of the 11th day of the month.

=== Other uses ===
Actor Stephen Fry uses the phrase Moab Is My Washpot for the title of his autobiography covering his early years.

== Musical settings ==
Heinrich Schütz set Psalm 60 in a metred version in German, "Ach Gott, der du vor dieser Zeit", SWV 157, as part of the Becker Psalter, first published in 1628.

== Text ==
The following table shows the Hebrew text of the Psalm with vowels, alongside the Koine Greek text in the Septuagint and the English translation from the King James Version. Note that the meaning can slightly differ between these versions, as the Septuagint and the Masoretic Text come from different textual traditions. (Note: A 1917 translation directly from Hebrew to English by the Jewish Publication Society can be found here or here, and an 1844 translation directly from the Septuagint by L. C. L. Brenton can be found here. Both translations are in the public domain.) In the Septuagint, this psalm is numbered Psalm 59.

#	Hebrew	English	Greek
(Note: In the Jewish verse numbering, the ascription of this psalm is verses 1 and 2, and the rest of the psalm begins from verse 3. However, the Christian verse numbering does not count the ascription.)	לַ֭מְנַצֵּחַ עַל־שׁוּשַׁ֣ן עֵד֑וּת מִכְתָּ֖ם לְדָוִ֣ד לְלַמֵּֽד׃	(To the chief Musician upon Shushaneduth, (Note: Shushan Eduth, meaning "Lily of Testimony", may have been the name of a particular tune or style.) Michtam of David, to teach;	Εἰς τὸ τέλος· τοῖς ἀλλοιωθησομένοις ἔτι, εἰς στηλογραφίαν τῷ Δαυΐδ, εἰς διδαχήν,
	בְּהַצּוֹת֨וֹ ׀ אֶ֥ת־אֲרַ֣ם נַהֲרַיִם֮ וְאֶת־אֲרַ֢ם צ֫וֹבָ֥ה וַיָּ֤שׇׁב יוֹאָ֗ב וַיַּ֣ךְ אֶת־אֱד֣וֹם בְּגֵיא־מֶ֑לַח שְׁנֵ֖ים עָשָׂ֣ר אָֽלֶף׃	when he strove with Aramnaharaim and with Aramzobah, when Joab returned, and smote of Edom in the valley of salt twelve thousand.) (Note: This is recorded in 2 Samuel 8.)	ὁπότε ἐνεπύρισε τὴν Μεσοποταμίαν Συρίας καὶ τὴν Συρίαν Σοβά, καὶ ἐπέστρεψεν ᾿Ιωάβ, καὶ ἐπάταξε τὴν φάραγγα τῶν ἁλῶν, δώδεκα χιλιάδας. -
1	אֱ֭לֹהִים זְנַחְתָּ֣נוּ פְרַצְתָּ֑נוּ אָ֝נַ֗פְתָּ תְּשׁ֣וֹבֵֽב לָֽנוּ׃	O God, thou hast cast us off, thou hast scattered us, thou hast been displeased; O turn thyself to us again.	Ο ΘΕΟΣ, ἀπώσω ἡμᾶς καὶ καθεῖλες ἡμᾶς, ὠργίσθης καὶ οἰκτείρησας ἡμᾶς.
2	הִרְעַ֣שְׁתָּה אֶ֣רֶץ פְּצַמְתָּ֑הּ רְפָ֖ה שְׁבָרֶ֣יהָ כִי־מָֽטָה׃	Thou hast made the earth to tremble; thou hast broken it: heal the breaches thereof; for it shaketh.	συνέσεισας τὴν γῆν καὶ συνετάραξας αὐτήν· ἴασαι τὰ συντρίμματα αὐτῆς ὅτι ἐσαλεύθη.
3	הִרְאִ֣יתָ עַמְּךָ֣ קָשָׁ֑ה הִ֝שְׁקִיתָ֗נוּ יַ֣יִן תַּרְעֵלָֽה׃	Thou hast shewed thy people hard things: thou hast made us to drink the wine of astonishment.	ἔδειξας τῷ λαῷ σου σκληρά, ἐπότισας ἡμᾶς οἶνον κατανύξεως.
4	נָ֘תַ֤תָּה לִּירֵאֶ֣יךָ נֵּ֭ס לְהִתְנוֹסֵ֑ס מִ֝פְּנֵ֗י קֹ֣שֶׁט סֶֽלָה׃	Thou hast given a banner to them that fear thee, that it may be displayed because of the truth. Selah.	ἔδωκας τοῖς φοβουμένοις σε σημείωσιν τοῦ φυγεῖν ἀπὸ προσώπου τόξου. (διάψαλμα).
5	לְ֭מַעַן יֵחָלְצ֣וּן יְדִידֶ֑יךָ הוֹשִׁ֖יעָה יְמִינְךָ֣ (ועננו) [וַעֲנֵֽנִי]׃	That thy beloved may be delivered; save with thy right hand, and hear me.	ὅπως ἂν ῥυσθῶσιν οἱ ἀγαπητοί σου, σῶσον τῇ δεξιᾷ σου καὶ ἐπάκουσόν μου.
6	אֱלֹהִ֤ים ׀ דִּבֶּ֥ר בְּקׇדְשׁ֗וֹ אֶ֫עְלֹ֥זָה אֲחַלְּקָ֥ה שְׁכֶ֑ם וְעֵ֖מֶק סֻכּ֣וֹת אֲמַדֵּֽד׃	God hath spoken in his holiness; I will rejoice, I will divide Shechem, and mete out the valley of Succoth.	ὁ Θεὸς ἐλάλησεν ἐν τῷ ἁγίῳ αὐτοῦ· ἀγαλλιάσομαι καὶ διαμεριῶ Σίκιμα καὶ τὴν κοιλάδα τῶν σκηνῶν διαμετρήσω.
7	לִ֤י גִלְעָ֨ד ׀ וְלִ֬י מְנַשֶּׁ֗ה וְ֭אֶפְרַיִם מָע֣וֹז רֹאשִׁ֑י יְ֝הוּדָ֗ה מְחֹֽקְקִֽי׃	Gilead is mine, and Manasseh is mine; Ephraim also is the strength of mine head; Judah is my lawgiver;	ἐμός ἐστι Γαλαάδ, καὶ ἐμός ἐστι Μανασσῆ, καὶ ᾿Εφραὶμ κραταίωσις τῆς κεφαλῆς μου, ᾿Ιούδας βασιλεύς μου·
8	מוֹאָ֤ב ׀ סִ֬יר רַחְצִ֗י עַל־אֱ֭דוֹם אַשְׁלִ֣יךְ נַעֲלִ֑י עָ֝לַ֗י פְּלֶ֣שֶׁת הִתְרוֹעָֽעִי׃	Moab is my washpot; over Edom will I cast out my shoe: Philistia, triumph thou because of me.	Μωὰβ λέβης τῆς ἐλπίδος μου, ἐπὶ τὴν ᾿Ιδουμαίαν ἐκτενῶ τὸ ὑπόδημά μου, ἐμοὶ ἀλλόφυλοι ὑπετάγησαν.
9	מִ֣י יֹ֭בִלֵנִי עִ֣יר מָצ֑וֹר מִ֖י נָחַ֣נִי עַד־אֱדֽוֹם׃	Who will bring me into the strong city? who will lead me into Edom?	τίς ἀπάξει με εἰς πόλιν περιοχῆς; ἢ τίς ὁδηγήσει με ἕως τῆς ᾿Ιδουμαίας;
10	הֲלֹֽא־אַתָּ֣ה אֱלֹהִ֣ים זְנַחְתָּ֑נוּ וְֽלֹא־תֵצֵ֥א אֱ֝לֹהִ֗ים בְּצִבְאוֹתֵֽינוּ׃	Wilt not thou, O God, which hadst cast us off? and thou, O God, which didst not go out with our armies?	οὐχὶ σύ, ὁ Θεός, ὁ ἀπωσάμενος ἡμᾶς; καὶ οὐκ ἐξελεύσῃ, ὁ Θεός, ἐν ταῖς δυνάμεσιν ἡμῶν;
11	הָֽבָה־לָּ֣נוּ עֶזְרָ֣ת מִצָּ֑ר וְ֝שָׁ֗וְא תְּשׁוּעַ֥ת אָדָֽם׃	Give us help from trouble: for vain is the help of man.	δὸς ἡμῖν βοήθειαν ἐκ θλίψεως, καὶ ματαία σωτηρία ἀνθρώπου.
12	בֵּאלֹהִ֥ים נַֽעֲשֶׂה־חָ֑יִל וְ֝ה֗וּא יָב֥וּס צָרֵֽינוּ׃	Through God we shall do valiantly: for he it is that shall tread down our enemies.	ἐν τῷ Θεῷ ποιήσωμεν δύναμιν, καὶ αὐτὸς ἐξουδενώσει τοὺς θλίβοντας ἡμᾶς.

== See also ==
- 1 Chronicles 18:12
