= Psalm 108 =

Sacred song in the Hebrew Bible

- "O give thanks unto the LORD"
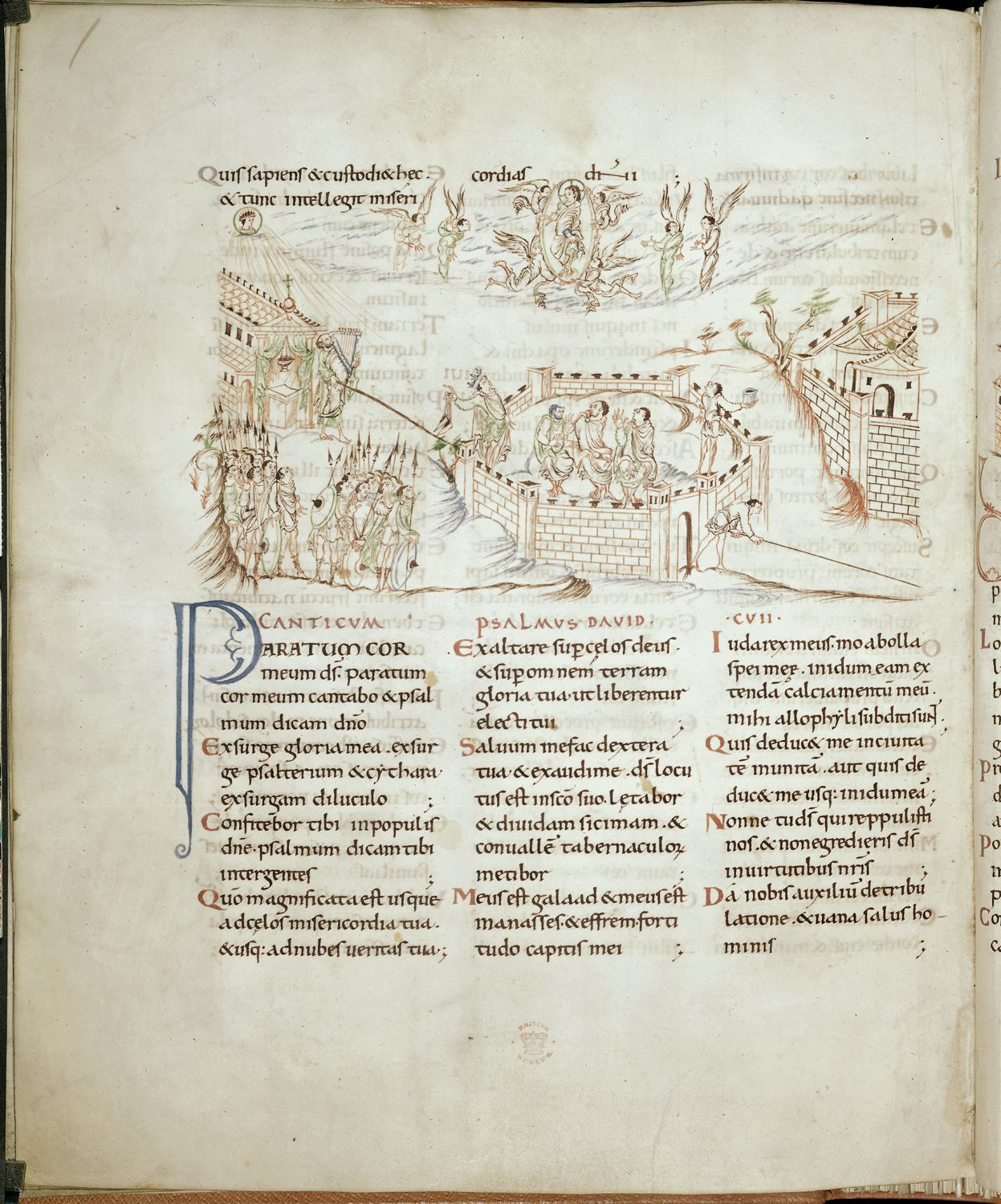
- Psalm 108 in the Harley Psalter (1000-1050)
- Other name: Psalm 107; "Paratum cor meum Deus"
- Language: Hebrew (original)

Psalm 108
- ← Psalm 107 Psalm 109 →
- Book: Book of Psalms
- Hebrew Bible part: Ketuvim
- Order in the Hebrew part: 1
- Category: Sifrei Emet
- Christian Bible part: Old Testament
- Order in the Christian part: 19

Psalm 108 is the 108th psalm in the Book of Psalms. It is a hymn psalm, beginning in English in the King James Version: "O God, my heart is fixed; I will sing and give praise, even with my glory". In the slightly different numbering system used in the Greek Septuagint version of the bible, and in the Latin Vulgate, this psalm is Psalm 107. In Latin, it is known as "Paratum cor meum Deus". It is attributed to David.

The psalm forms a regular part of Jewish, Catholic, Lutheran, Anglican and other Protestant liturgies. It has been set to music.

== Structure and themes ==
Psalm 108 contains numerous verses which appear in other psalms. Verses 1–5 are similar to Psalm 57:7–11, with slight variation, while verses 7–13 are similar to Psalm 60:5–12. William Barrick considers this psalm to be the "borrower". John Paul II said that the fusion of Psalms 57 and 60 with Psalm 108 shows that "Israel, already in the Old Testament, was re-using and bringing up-to-date the Word of God revealed".

Charles Spurgeon called Psalm 108 "The Warrior's Morning Song, with which he adores his God and strengthens his heart before entering upon the conflicts of the day". He notes that in Psalm 57, verses 7-11 follow on from prayer "and grow out of it", whereas here they initiate the psalm: "the psalmist begins at once to sing and give praise, and afterwards prays to God in a remarkably confident manner".

Matthew Henry calls it "an assurance of God's answer and salvation".

== Uses ==
=== Judaism ===
- Verse 5 is recited during Selichot.
- Verse 7 is part of the Elokai Netzor paragraph at the end of the Amidah. This verse is identical to verse 7 in Psalm 60.

=== Catholic Church ===
This is one of the psalms for which St. Benedict of Nursia did not specify the use, in the Rule of St. Benedict of 530AD. However, Psalm 108 was traditionally performed by his order for matins of Saturday, or according to another document of the founder or according to one of his successors, so that all 150 psalms are executed each Week.

In the Liturgy of the Hours, Psalm 108 is read to the Office of Lauds of Wednesday of the fourth week.

=== Eastern Orthodox Church ===
In the Eastern Orthodox Church, Psalm 107 (Psalm 108 in the Masoretic Text) is part of the fifteenth Kathisma division of the Psalter, read at Vespers on Thursday evenings, as well as on Tuesdays and Fridays during Lent, at the Sixth Hour and Matins, respectively.

=== Protestant ===
Psalm 108 has been set to music in the Anglican "Hymnal 1982", The United Methodist Hymnal, Psalter Hymnal (Gray) and the Baptist Hymnal (1991 version).

=== Book of Common Prayer ===
In the Church of England's Book of Common Prayer, this psalm is appointed to be read on the evening of the twenty-second day of the month, as well as at Evensong on Ascension Day.

== Musical setting ==
Heinrich Schütz composed a four-part setting to a metric German text, "Mit rechtem Ernst und fröhlichm Mut", SVW 206, for the 1628 Becker Psalter. Marc-Antoine Charpentier set it around 1680 in Latin, Paratum cor meum Deus, H.183, for three voices and continuo.

== Text ==
The following table shows the Hebrew text of the Psalm with vowels, alongside the Koine Greek text in the Septuagint and the English translation from the King James Version. Note that the meaning can slightly differ between these versions, as the Septuagint and the Masoretic Text come from different textual traditions. (Note: A 1917 translation directly from Hebrew to English by the Jewish Publication Society can be found here or here, and an 1844 translation directly from the Septuagint by L. C. L. Brenton can be found here. Both translations are in the public domain.) In the Septuagint, this psalm is numbered Psalm 107.

#	Hebrew	English	Greek
(Note: In the Jewish verse numbering, the ascription of this psalm is verse 1, and the rest of the psalm begins from verse 2. However, the Christian verse numbering does not count the ascription.)	שִׁ֖יר מִזְמ֣וֹר לְדָוִֽד׃	(A Song or Psalm of David.)	᾿ῼδὴ ψαλμοῦ τῷ Δαυΐδ. -
1	נָכ֣וֹן לִבִּ֣י אֱלֹהִ֑ים אָשִׁ֥ירָה וַ֝אֲזַמְּרָ֗ה אַף־כְּבוֹדִֽי׃	O God, my heart is fixed; I will sing and give praise, even with my glory.	ΕΤΟΙΜΗ ἡ καρδία μου, ὁ Θεός, ἑτοίμη ἡ καρδία μου, ᾄσομαι καὶ ψαλῶ ἐν τῇ δόξῃ μου.
2	ע֭וּרָֽה הַנֵּ֥בֶל וְכִנּ֗וֹר אָעִ֥ירָה שָּֽׁחַר׃	Awake, psaltery and harp: I myself will awake early.	ἐξεγέρθητι, ψαλτήριον καὶ κιθάρα· ἐξεγερθήσομαι ὄρθρου.
3	אוֹדְךָ֖ בָעַמִּ֥ים ׀ יְהֹוָ֑ה וַ֝אֲזַמֶּרְךָ֗ בַּלְאֻמִּֽים׃	I will praise thee, O LORD, among the people: and I will sing praises unto thee among the nations.	ἐξομολογήσομαί σοι ἐν λαοῖς, Κύριε, ψαλῶ σοι ἐν ἔθνεσιν,
4	כִּי־גָד֣וֹל מֵעַל־שָׁמַ֣יִם חַסְדֶּ֑ךָ וְֽעַד־שְׁחָקִ֥ים אֲמִתֶּֽךָ׃	For thy mercy is great above the heavens: and thy truth reacheth unto the clouds.	ὅτι μέγα ἐπάνω τῶν οὐρανῶν τὸ ἔλεός σου καὶ ἕως τῶν νεφελῶν ἡ ἀλήθειά σου.
5	ר֣וּמָה עַל־שָׁמַ֣יִם אֱלֹהִ֑ים וְעַ֖ל כׇּל־הָאָ֣רֶץ כְּבוֹדֶֽךָ׃	Be thou exalted, O God, above the heavens: and thy glory above all the earth;	ὑψώθητι ἐπὶ τοὺς οὐρανούς, ὁ Θεός, καὶ ἐπὶ πᾶσαν τὴν γῆν ἡ δόξα σου.
6	לְ֭מַעַן יֵחָלְצ֣וּן יְדִידֶ֑יךָ הוֹשִׁ֖יעָה יְמִֽינְךָ֣ וַעֲנֵֽנִי׃	That thy beloved may be delivered: save with thy right hand, and answer me.	ὅπως ἂν ῥυσθῶσιν οἱ ἀγαπητοί σου, σῶσον τῇ δεξιᾷ σου καὶ ἐπάκουσόν μου.
7	אֱלֹהִ֤ים ׀ דִּבֶּ֥ר בְּקׇדְשׁ֗וֹ אֶ֫עְלֹ֥זָה אֲחַלְּקָ֥ה שְׁכֶ֑ם וְעֵ֖מֶק סֻכּ֣וֹת אֲמַדֵּֽד׃	God hath spoken in his holiness; I will rejoice, I will divide Shechem, and mete out the valley of Succoth.	ὁ Θεὸς ἐλάλησεν ἐν τῷ ἁγίῳ αὐτοῦ· ὑψωθήσομαι καὶ διαμεριῶ Σίκιμα, καὶ τὴν κοιλάδα τῶν σκηνῶν διαμετρήσω·
8	לִ֤י גִלְעָ֨ד ׀ לִ֤י מְנַשֶּׁ֗ה וְ֭אֶפְרַיִם מָע֣וֹז רֹאשִׁ֑י יְ֝הוּדָ֗ה מְחֹקְקִֽי׃	Gilead is mine; Manasseh is mine; Ephraim also is the strength of mine head; Judah is my lawgiver;	ἐμός ἐστι Γαλαάδ, καὶ ἐμός ἐστι Μανασσῆς, καὶ ᾿Εφραὶμ ἀντίληψις τῆς κεφαλῆς μου, ᾿Ιούδας βασιλεύς μου,
9	מוֹאָ֤ב ׀ סִ֬יר רַחְצִ֗י עַל־אֱ֭דוֹם אַשְׁלִ֣יךְ נַעֲלִ֑י עֲלֵי־פְ֝לֶ֗שֶׁת אֶתְרוֹעָֽע׃	Moab is my washpot; over Edom will I cast out my shoe; over Philistia will I triumph.	Μωὰβ λέβης τῆς ἐλπίδος μου, ἐπὶ τὴν ᾿Ιδουμαίαν ἐπιβαλῶ τὸ ὑπόδημά μου, ἐμοὶ ἀλλόφυλοι ὑπετάγησαν.
10	מִ֣י יֹ֭בִלֵנִי עִ֣יר מִבְצָ֑ר מִ֖י נָחַ֣נִי עַד־אֱדֽוֹם׃	Who will bring me into the strong city? who will lead me into Edom?	τίς ἀπάξει με εἰς πόλιν περιοχῆς; ἢ τίς ὁδηγήσει με ἕως τῆς ᾿Ιδουμαίας;
11	הֲלֹֽא־אֱלֹהִ֥ים זְנַחְתָּ֑נוּ וְֽלֹא־תֵצֵ֥א אֱ֝לֹהִ֗ים בְּצִבְאֹתֵֽינוּ׃	Wilt not thou, O God, who hast cast us off? and wilt not thou, O God, go forth with our hosts?	οὐχὶ σύ, ὁ Θεός, ὁ ἀπωσάμενος ἡμᾶς; καὶ οὐκ ἐξελεύσῃ, ὁ Θεός, ἐν ταῖς δυνάμεσιν ἡμῶν;
12	הָבָה־לָּ֣נוּ עֶזְרָ֣ת מִצָּ֑ר וְ֝שָׁ֗וְא תְּשׁוּעַ֥ת אָדָֽם׃	Give us help from trouble: for vain is the help of man.	δὸς ἡμῖν βοήθειαν ἐκ θλίψεως, καὶ ματαία σωτηρία ἀνθρώπου.
13	בֵּאלֹהִ֥ים נַעֲשֶׂה־חָ֑יִל וְ֝ה֗וּא יָב֥וּס צָרֵֽינוּ׃	Through God we shall do valiantly: for he it is that shall tread down our enemies.	ἐν τῷ Θεῷ ποιήσωμεν δύναμιν, καὶ αὐτὸς ἐξουδενώσει τοὺς ἐχθροὺς ἡμῶν.

=== Verse 2 ===
Awake, lute and harp!
I will awaken the dawn.

The Midrash teaches that this verse (verse 3 in Hebrew numbering) refers to David's practice of arising each night before dawn and praising God with psaltery and harp, thus "awakening the dawn".
