= Imam-ud-Din Shahbaz =

Padri Imam-ud-Din Shahbaz
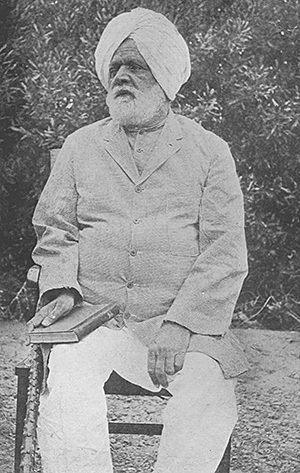
- Born: Imam-ud-Din; 1845; Zafarwal, Punjab, British India (present-day Pakistan)
- Died: 1921; Bhalwal, Punjab, British India (present-day Pakistan)
- Years active: 1866–1921

Ecclesiastical career
- Religion: Christian
- Church: United Presbyterian Church, Sialkot, First United Presbyterian Church
- Writings: Psalms in Punjabi language

Imam-ud-Din Shahbaz (or ID Shahbaz, Urdu: امام الدین شہباز) was a Punjabi evangelist and a poet from the present-day Pakistan. His notable work is the first metrical translation of the Psalms in Punjabi known as Punjabi Zabur. He chose Shahbaz, meaning the King of the Falcons, as his takhallus. His contributions to Punjabi literature and evangelism spanned over five decades, from 1866 to 1921. He died in 1921 in the town of Bhalwal, near Sargodha, a city now in Punjab Province in Pakistan.

== Early life ==
Shahbaz was born in 1845 in Zafarwal in a Muslim family and converted to Christianity at the age of 10. His early life laid the foundation for his later work as a Punjabi evangelist and poet. He was appointed as a teacher at Church Missionary Society in Amritsar in 1866 where he was baptised by Robert Clark. He worked as a teacher in various missionary schools for nine years.

== Missionary life ==
After being baptized, Shahbaz committed to evangelistic work with the Church Mission Society. Clark noted him as one of eight notable converts who were trained at the Amritsar Mission School for the purpose of continuing the dissemination and education of the Christian faith. Shahbaz was also acknowledged for his teaching skills. He was a part of the CMS schools in Amritsar and was involved in evangelistic activities from 1866 to 1880.

Shahbaz resided in Sialkot for the majority of his life, where he was ordained by the United Presbyterian Church. From 1886 to 1906, he served as the pastor of the First United Presbyterian Church in Sialkot. According to Emma Dean Anderson, Shahbaz had a profound influence on many students and led a congregation that was largely attended by students in its early days. In 1906, as the translation work was nearing completion, Shahbaz was relieved of his church duties to focus entirely on the translation of the Punjabi Psalms.

== Legacy and influence ==
Shahbaz is credited for his seminal contribution to Punjabi literature, most notably, the Punjabi Zabur. This work, the first metrical translation of the Psalms into Punjabi, holds a place of prominence in Pakistani churches. The Punjabi Zabur is not only read and memorised, but also sung and recited during worship, making it an integral part of religious practices. It has thus become one of the most recognised portions of Scripture in Pakistan.
