= Golden Psalter of Saint Gall =

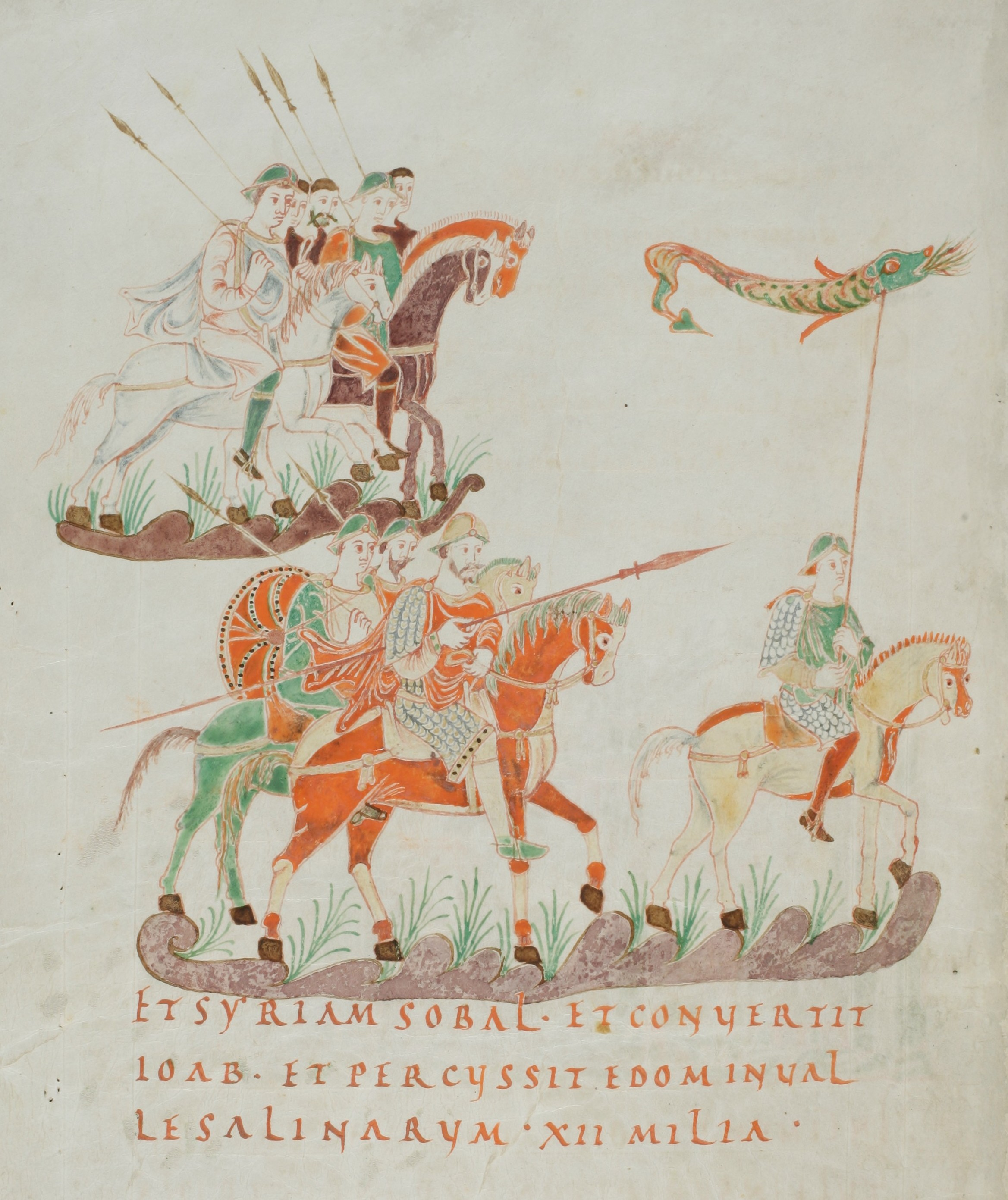
Illustration of psalm 59 (60) (showing Joab as a cavalry leader in Carolingian-era Frankish cavalry fashion).

The Golden Psalter of Saint Gall (Psalterium Aureum, Codex Sangallensis 22) is a Carolingian Gallican psalter produced in the late 9th century, probably begun in West Francia (Soissons, court school of Charles the Bald?), later continued in St. Gall Abbey.

The manuscript consists of 344 vellum leaves (37 cm × 28 cm, 15 in × 11 in), with two full-page miniatures and fifteen full or half-page illustrations on the psalm titles. The decorations are predominantly in the first half of the manuscript. The final pictorial illustration shows "David in the desert of Judah" (depicted as a Carolingian nobleman with three men-at-arms standing in a forest), illustrating psalm 62 (63) (p. 141), although the figure of King David is again shown as standing on the S initial of psalm 68 (69).

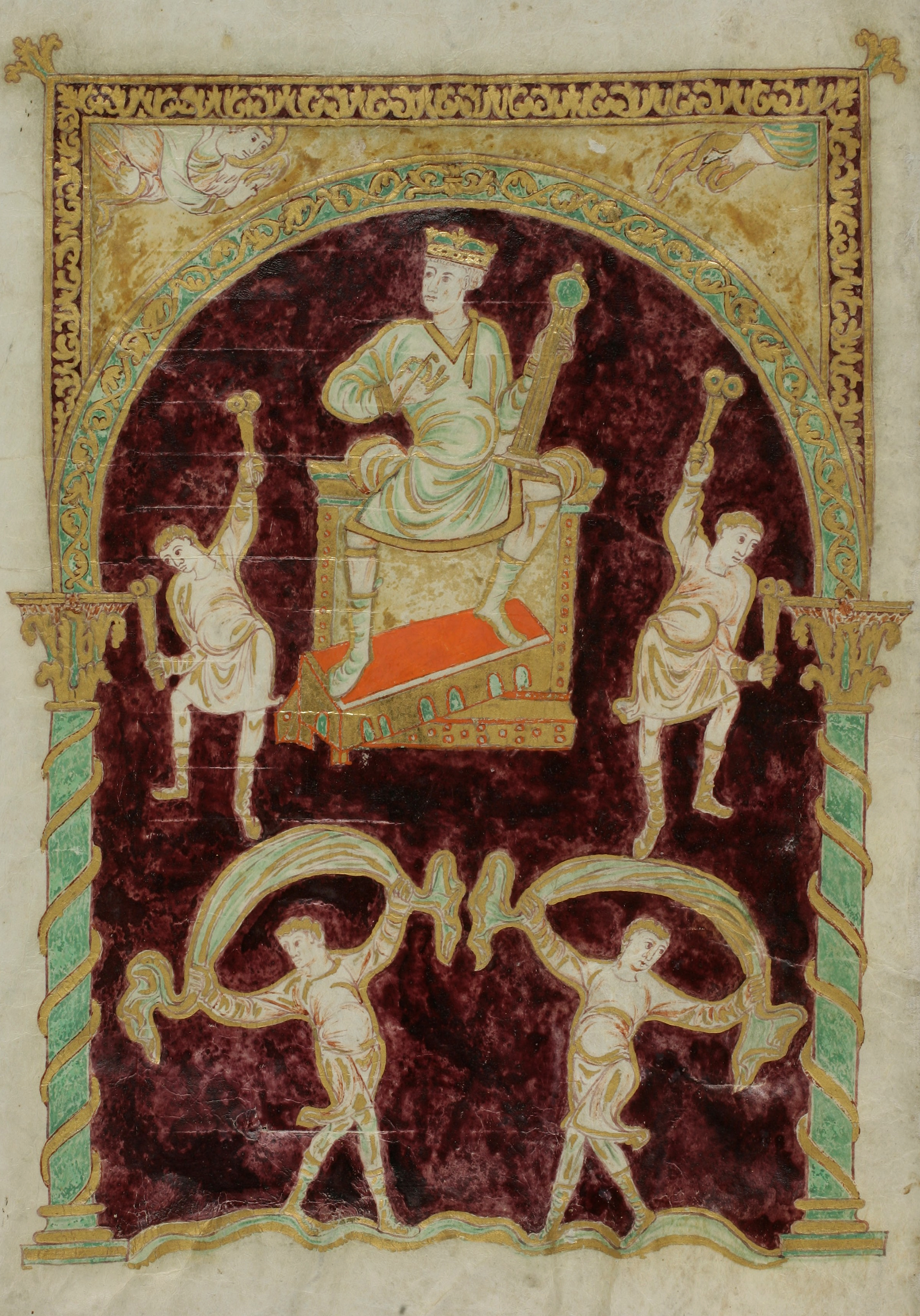
King David playing string instrument, with two musicians on clappers and two dancers, from the Golden Psalter of St. Gallen, Cod. Sang. 22, page 2
