= Psalm of communal lament =

The psalms of communal lament are a group of Psalm Forms from the Hebrew Bible, classified by their focus on laments expressing deep sorrow for the travails of a nation and as a group asking for God's blessing or intervention. Psalms of communal laments were more commonly found in printed Psalters following major natural disasters, plague, or oppression by surrounding nations.

== Structure ==
The motifs of the communal lament psalm are very similar to the individual lament, but includes a corporate form of language and a focus on motivating God to bless the nation and smite its enemies.

A Communal Lament essentially consists of six possible parts:

- The Address - usually directly to God, "Hear me O God"
- The Lament Proper - a description of the occurrences for which the people are requesting assistance or rescue
- National Confession of Trust - a statement showing the nation's belief that God will hear their prayers
- The Petition Proper and Motivation - a usually very specific statement of what the people want God to do
- Exclamation of Certainty- That the psalmists prayer has been or will be heard by God
- Vow of Praise - portion of the lament where the people promise to offer thanksgiving once seeing God's intervention

In addition to the aforementioned elements, a lament may also include a curse of the enemies which the people believe to be the cause of their suffering or a claiming of the people's guilt or innocence in the situation.

== List of Psalms of Communal Lament ==
Using the Hebrew numbering system, the following are traditionally categorized as psalms of communal lament:

- Psalm 44
- Psalm 60
- Psalm 74
- Psalm 79
- Psalm 80
- Psalm 85
- Psalm 86
- Psalm 90

== Purpose and setting ==
The reading and reflection on these psalms are intended to express empathy for people suffering as a result of great loss. In many instances, communal laments were used in corporal worship/gatherings, possibly even with royalty present.

== A Note on Individual Laments ==
Whereas communal laments speak on behalf of a body of people, a nation perhaps, individual laments are written from the perspective of one person, using first person singular pronouns rather than plural pronouns (communal lament). Individual laments, more present than communal laments in Psalms, may have been kept for home use rather than in corporate settings, with the exception of Royal Laments - those written by a king for recitation in front of his subjects.
