= Psalm 44 =

Biblical psalm

- "We have heard with our ears, O God, our fathers have told us"
- (Psalm XLIII Vulgate) in a 1499 psalter
- Other name: Psalm 43; "Deus auribus nostris audivimus patres nostri adnuntiaverunt"
- Language: Hebrew (original)

Psalm 44
- ← Psalm 43 Psalm 45 →
- Book: Book of Psalms
- Hebrew Bible part: Ketuvim
- Order in the Hebrew part: 1
- Category: Sifrei Emet
- Christian Bible part: Old Testament
- Order in the Christian part: 19

Psalm 44 is the 44th psalm of the Book of Psalms, beginning in English in the King James Version: "We have heard with our ears, O God, our fathers have told us". In the slightly different numbering system used in the Greek Septuagint version of the Bible, and generally in its Latin translations, this psalm is Psalm 43. In the Vulgate, it begins "Deus auribus nostris audivimus patres nostri adnuntiaverunt". The psalm was composed by the sons of Korah and is classified in the series of lamentations of the people.

The psalm forms a regular part of Jewish, Catholic, Lutheran, Anglican and other Protestant liturgies and has often been set to music.

== Structure ==
Usually, the Psalm is organized as follows:

1. Verses 2–9: Healing Historical Review.
2. Verses 10–23: describing the current disaster.
3. Verses 24–27: Final request for termination of the disaster through the intervention of God.

Another scheme put forward to reflect the flow of Psalm 44 is as follows (using English versification):

1. Remembering that God performed mighty deeds in the past for his people (vv. 1–3)
2. Desiring God to perform mighty deeds now (vv. 4–8)
3. Lamenting God's "recent" chastening of his people (vv. 9–16)
4. Appealing to God that his chastening is not a result of their sin (vv. 17–22)
5. Calling on God to again engage in his mighty deeds on their behalf (vv. 23–26).

As a central message of the psalm Hermann Gunkel noted the contrast between past and present events.

In Jewish traditions, it is viewed as suffering in the face of the golden past, which all the more shows the plight of the current situation.

== Structure and theme ==
The psalm begins with a recounting of the days of old in verse 2, that God had driven out the nations and planted the Israelites, placing this well after the periods of conquest and the judges. The reference to scattering the Israelites among the nations in verse 11 could point to a date after either the Assyrian captivity in 722 B.C. or after the Babylonian captivity in 586 B.C. However, some have noted that the reference to God not going out with their armies in verse 9 would indicate that the Jewish nation still had standing armies at the time of the writing of this psalm, and thus the setting would be prior to Judah's exile to Babylon. In addition, the psalmist's insistence in verses 17 and 18 that their plight was not due to national sin is further confirmation that the psalmist is not referring to a time after the Babylonian exile, which the prophets made clear was, in fact, a result of idolatry and turning away from the Lord. By no means conclusive, a conflict is recorded in Isaiah 36, 2 Chronicles 32, and 2 Kings 18 matching the above suggested timeline for Psalm 44. The writer of the Explaining the Book commentary notes that neither Charles Spurgeon nor Matthew Henry felt that they could be clear about the setting for this psalm. The Jerusalem Bible suggests that verses 17-22 "may perhaps have been added later to adapt the psalm to the persecutions of the Maccabean period".

== Uses ==
=== New Testament ===
Verse 22 is referenced by the Apostle Paul in Romans 8:36 in the context of realities that can make Christians think that they are separated from God's love.

=== Judaism ===
- Verse 9 is found in the repetition of the Amidah during Rosh Hashanah.
- Parts of verses 14 and 23 form a verse found in the long Tachanun recited on Mondays and Thursdays.
- Verse 27 is the sixth verse of Hoshia Et Amecha in Pesukei Dezimra.

=== Book of Common Prayer ===
In the Church of England's Book of Common Prayer, this psalm is appointed to be read on the morning of the ninth day of the month.

== Literary form ==
Psalm 44 is a psalm of communal lament, indicating that the suffering, in this case from being defeated by enemies, is communal. It reflects each of five key elements of a lament, or complaint:

- Address: Verse 1

"We have heard with our ears, O God, our ancestors have told us, what deeds you performed in their days, in the days of old" (44:1)

In this case, the Psalmist is speaking directly to God.

- Complaint: verses 9–16, 17–19

In these verses, the Psalmist laments that God has been slow to act and has a responsibility to save these people from their enemies.

- Statement of trust in the reliability of God as known by the Psalmist or community: verses 4–8

The Psalmist recites a history of God's saving acts, which includes reference to God commanding victories for Jacob.

- Petition for God's active intervention: verses 23–26

These petitions can be quite specific. In verse 26, the Psalmist gives a direct command to God to "Rise up, come to our help."

- Vow of Thanksgiving: verse 8

This particular Psalm includes a brief vow of thanksgiving in verse 8, when the Psalmist writes "In God we have boasted continually, and we will give thanks to your name forever" (44:8)

== Musical settings ==
Heinrich Schütz wrote a setting of a paraphrase of Psalm 44 in German, "Wir haben, Herr, mit Fleiß gehört", SWV 141, for the Becker Psalter, published first in 1628.

== Text ==
The following table shows the Hebrew text of the Psalm with vowels, alongside the Koine Greek text in the Septuagint and the English translation from the King James Version. Note that the meaning can slightly differ between these versions, as the Septuagint and the Masoretic Text come from different textual traditions. (Note: A 1917 translation directly from Hebrew to English by the Jewish Publication Society can be found here or here, and an 1844 translation directly from the Septuagint by L. C. L. Brenton can be found here. Both translations are in the public domain.) In the Septuagint, this psalm is numbered Psalm 43.

#	Hebrew	English	Greek
(Note: In the Jewish verse numbering, the ascription of this psalm is verse 1, and the rest of the psalm begins from verse 2. However, the Christian verse numbering does not count the ascription as a separate verse.)	לַמְנַצֵּ֬חַ ׀ לִבְנֵי־קֹ֬רַח מַשְׂכִּֽיל׃	(To the chief Musician for the sons of Korah, Maschil.)	Εἰς τὸ τέλος· τοῖς υἱοῖς Κορὲ εἰς σύνεσιν ψαλμός. -
1	אֱלֹהִ֤ים ׀ בְּאׇזְנֵ֬ינוּ שָׁמַ֗עְנוּ אֲבוֹתֵ֥ינוּ סִפְּרוּ־לָ֑נוּ פֹּ֥עַל פָּעַ֥לְתָּ בִ֝ימֵיהֶ֗ם בִּ֣ימֵי קֶֽדֶם׃	We have heard with our ears, O God, our fathers have told us, what work thou didst in their days, in the times of old.	Ο ΘΕΟΣ, ἐν τοῖς ὠσὶν ἡμῶν ἠκούσαμεν, καὶ οἱ πατέρες ἡμῶν ἀνήγγειλαν ἡμῖν ἔργον, ὃ εἰργάσω ἐν ταῖς ἡμέραις αὐτῶν, ἐν ἡμέραις ἀρχαίαις.
2	אַתָּ֤ה ׀ יָדְךָ֡ גּוֹיִ֣ם ה֭וֹרַשְׁתָּ וַתִּטָּעֵ֑ם תָּרַ֥ע לְ֝אֻמִּ֗ים וַֽתְּשַׁלְּחֵֽם׃	How thou didst drive out the heathen with thy hand, and plantedst them; how thou didst afflict the people, and cast them out.	ἡ χείρ σου ἔθνη ἐξωλόθρευσε, καὶ κατεφύτευσας αὐτούς, ἐκάκωσας λαοὺς καὶ ἐξέβαλες αὐτούς.
3	כִּ֤י לֹ֪א בְחַרְבָּ֡ם יָ֥רְשׁוּ אָ֗רֶץ וּזְרוֹעָם֮ לֹא־הוֹשִׁ֢יעָ֫ה לָּ֥מוֹ כִּֽי־יְמִינְךָ֣ וּ֭זְרוֹעֲךָ וְא֥וֹר פָּנֶ֗יךָ כִּ֣י רְצִיתָֽם׃	For they got not the land in possession by their own sword, neither did their own arm save them: but thy right hand, and thine arm, and the light of thy countenance, because thou hadst a favour unto them.	οὐ γὰρ ἐν τῇ ῥομφαίᾳ αὐτῶν ἐκληρονόμησαν γῆν, καὶ ὁ βραχίων αὐτῶν οὐκ ἔσωσεν αὐτούς, ἀλλ᾿ ἡ δεξιά σου καὶ ὁ βραχίων σου καὶ ὁ φωτισμὸς τοῦ προσώπου σου, ὅτι ηὐδόκησας ἐν αὐτοῖς.
4	אַתָּה־ה֣וּא מַלְכִּ֣י אֱלֹהִ֑ים צַ֝וֵּ֗ה יְשׁוּע֥וֹת יַעֲקֹֽב׃	Thou art my King, O God: command deliverances for Jacob.	σὺ εἶ αὐτὸς ὁ Βασιλεύς μου καὶ ὁ Θεός μου ὁ ἐντελλόμενος τὰς σωτηρίας ᾿Ιακώβ·
5	בְּ֭ךָ צָרֵ֣ינוּ נְנַגֵּ֑חַ בְּ֝שִׁמְךָ֗ נָב֥וּס קָמֵֽינוּ׃	Through thee will we push down our enemies: through thy name will we tread them under that rise up against us.	ἐν σοὶ τοὺς ἐχθροὺς ἡμῶν κερατιοῦμεν καὶ ἐν τῷ ὀνόματί σου ἐξουδενώσομεν τοὺς ἐπανισταμένους ἡμῖν.
6	כִּ֤י לֹ֣א בְקַשְׁתִּ֣י אֶבְטָ֑ח וְ֝חַרְבִּ֗י לֹ֣א תוֹשִׁיעֵֽנִי׃	For I will not trust in my bow, neither shall my sword save me.	οὐ γὰρ ἐπὶ τῷ τόξῳ μου ἐλπιῶ, καὶ ἡ ῥομφαία μου οὐ σώσει με·
7	כִּ֣י ה֭וֹשַׁעְתָּנוּ מִצָּרֵ֑ינוּ וּמְשַׂנְאֵ֥ינוּ הֱבִישֽׁוֹתָ׃	But thou hast saved us from our enemies, and hast put them to shame that hated us.	ἔσωσας γὰρ ἡμᾶς ἐκ τῶν θλιβόντων ἡμᾶς καὶ τοὺς μισοῦντας ἡμᾶς κατῄσχυνας.
8	בֵּ֭אלֹהִים הִלַּ֣לְנוּ כׇל־הַיּ֑וֹם וְשִׁמְךָ֓ ׀ לְעוֹלָ֖ם נוֹדֶ֣ה סֶֽלָה׃	In God we boast all the day long, and praise thy name for ever. Selah.	ἐν τῷ Θεῷ ἐπαινεθησόμεθα ὅλην τὴν ἡμέραν καὶ ἐν τῷ ὀνόματί σου ἐξομολογηθησόμεθα εἰς τὸν αἰῶνα. (διάψαλμα).
9	אַף־זָ֭נַחְתָּ וַתַּכְלִימֵ֑נוּ וְלֹא־תֵ֝צֵ֗א בְּצִבְאוֹתֵֽינוּ׃	But thou hast cast off, and put us to shame; and goest not forth with our armies.	νυνὶ δὲ ἀπώσω καὶ κατῄσχυνας ἡμᾶς καὶ οὐκ ἐξελεύσῃ, ὁ Θεός, ἐν ταῖς δυνάμεσιν ἡμῶν.
10	תְּשִׁיבֵ֣נוּ אָ֭חוֹר מִנִּי־צָ֑ר וּ֝מְשַׂנְאֵ֗ינוּ שָׁ֣סוּ לָֽמוֹ׃	Thou makest us to turn back from the enemy: and they which hate us spoil for themselves.	ἀπέστρεψας ἡμᾶς εἰς τὰ ὀπίσω παρὰ τοὺς ἐχθροὺς ἡμῶν, καὶ οἱ μισοῦντες ἡμᾶς διήρπαζον ἑαυτοῖς.
11	תִּ֭תְּנֵנוּ כְּצֹ֣אן מַאֲכָ֑ל וּ֝בַגּוֹיִ֗ם זֵרִיתָֽנוּ׃	Thou hast given us like sheep appointed for meat; and hast scattered us among the heathen.	ἔδωκας ἡμᾶς ὡς πρόβατα βρώσεως καὶ ἐν τοῖς ἔθνεσι διέσπειρας ἡμᾶς·
12	תִּמְכֹּֽר־עַמְּךָ֥ בְלֹא־ה֑וֹן וְלֹֽא־רִ֝בִּ֗יתָ בִּמְחִירֵיהֶֽם׃	Thou sellest thy people for nought, and dost not increase thy wealth by their price.	ἀπέδου τὸν λαόν σου ἄνευ τιμῆς, καὶ οὐκ ἦν πλῆθος ἐν τοῖς ἀλαλάγμασιν αὐτῶν.
13	תְּשִׂימֵ֣נוּ חֶ֭רְפָּה לִשְׁכֵנֵ֑ינוּ לַ֥עַג וָ֝קֶ֗לֶס לִסְבִיבוֹתֵֽינוּ׃	Thou makest us a reproach to our neighbours, a scorn and a derision to them that are round about us.	ἔθου ἡμᾶς ὄνειδος τοῖς γείτοσιν ἡμῶν, μυκτηρισμὸν καὶ χλευασμὸν τοῖς κύκλῳ ἡμῶν·
14	תְּשִׂימֵ֣נוּ מָ֭שָׁל בַּגּוֹיִ֑ם מְנֽוֹד־רֹ֝֗אשׁ בַּלְאֻמִּֽים׃	Thou makest us a byword among the heathen, a shaking of the head among the people.	ἔθου ἡμᾶς εἰς παραβολὴν ἐν τοῖς ἔθνεσιν, κίνησιν κεφαλῆς ἐν τοῖς λαοῖς.
15	כׇּל־הַ֭יּוֹם כְּלִמָּתִ֣י נֶגְדִּ֑י וּבֹ֖שֶׁת פָּנַ֣י כִּסָּֽתְנִי׃	My confusion is continually before me, and the shame of my face hath covered me,	ὅλην τὴν ἡμέραν ἡ ἐντροπή μου κατεναντίον μού ἐστι, καὶ ἡ αἰσχύνη τοῦ προσώπου μου ἐκάλυψέ με
16	מִ֭קּוֹל מְחָרֵ֣ף וּמְגַדֵּ֑ף מִפְּנֵ֥י א֝וֹיֵ֗ב וּמִתְנַקֵּֽם׃	For the voice of him that reproacheth and blasphemeth; by reason of the enemy and avenger.	ἀπὸ φωνῆς ὀνειδίζοντος καὶ καταλαλοῦντος, ἀπὸ προσώπου ἐχθροῦ καὶ ἐκδιώκοντος.
17	כׇּל־זֹ֣את בָּ֭אַתְנוּ וְלֹ֣א שְׁכַחֲנ֑וּךָ וְלֹֽא־שִׁ֝קַּ֗רְנוּ בִּבְרִיתֶֽךָ׃	All this is come upon us; yet have we not forgotten thee, neither have we dealt falsely in thy covenant.	ταῦτα πάντα ἦλθεν ἐφ᾿ ἡμᾶς καὶ οὐκ ἐπελαθόμεθά σου καὶ οὐκ ἠδικήσαμεν ἐν τῇ διαθήκῃ σου,
18	לֹא־נָס֣וֹג אָח֣וֹר לִבֵּ֑נוּ וַתֵּ֥ט אֲ֝שֻׁרֵ֗ינוּ מִנִּ֥י אׇרְחֶֽךָ׃	Our heart is not turned back, neither have our steps declined from thy way;	καὶ οὐκ ἀπέστη εἰς τὰ ὀπίσω ἡ καρδία ἡμῶν καὶ ἐξέκλινας τὰς τρίβους ἡμῶν ἀπὸ τῆς ὁδοῦ σου.
19	כִּ֣י דִ֭כִּיתָנוּ בִּמְק֣וֹם תַּנִּ֑ים וַתְּכַ֖ס עָלֵ֣ינוּ בְצַלְמָֽוֶת׃	Though thou hast sore broken us in the place of dragons, and covered us with the shadow of death.	ὅτι ἐταπείνωσας ἡμᾶς ἐν τόπῳ κακώσεως, καὶ ἐπεκάλυψεν ἡμᾶς σκιὰ θανάτου.
20	אִם־שָׁ֭כַחְנוּ שֵׁ֣ם אֱלֹהֵ֑ינוּ וַנִּפְרֹ֥שׂ כַּ֝פֵּ֗ינוּ לְאֵ֣ל זָֽר׃	If we have forgotten the name of our God, or stretched out our hands to a strange god;	εἰ ἐπελαθόμεθα τοῦ ὀνόματος τοῦ Θεοῦ ἡμῶν καὶ εἰ διεπετάσαμεν χεῖρας ἡμῶν πρὸς Θεὸν ἀλλότριον,
21	הֲלֹ֣א אֱ֭לֹהִים יַחֲקׇר־זֹ֑את כִּי־ה֥וּא יֹ֝דֵ֗עַ תַּעֲלֻמ֥וֹת לֵֽב׃	Shall not God search this out? for he knoweth the secrets of the heart.	οὐχὶ ὁ Θεὸς ἐκζητήσει ταῦτα; αὐτὸς γὰρ γινώσκει τὰ κρύφια τῆς καρδίας.
22	כִּֽי־עָ֭לֶיךָ הֹרַ֣גְנוּ כׇל־הַיּ֑וֹם נֶ֝חְשַׁ֗בְנוּ כְּצֹ֣אן טִבְחָֽה׃	Yea, for thy sake are we killed all the day long; we are counted as sheep for the slaughter.	ὅτι ἕνεκά σου θανατούμεθα ὅλην τὴν ἡμέραν, ἐλογίσθημεν ὡς πρόβατα σφαγῆς.
23	ע֤וּרָה ׀ לָ֖מָּה תִישַׁ֥ן ׀ אֲדֹנָ֑י הָ֝קִ֗יצָה אַל־תִּזְנַ֥ח לָנֶֽצַח׃	Awake, why sleepest thou, O Lord? arise, cast us not off for ever.	ἐξεγέρθητι· ἱνατί ὑπνοῖς, Κύριε; ἀνάστηθι καὶ μὴ ἀπώσῃ εἰς τέλος.
24	לָֽמָּה־פָנֶ֥יךָ תַסְתִּ֑יר תִּשְׁכַּ֖ח עׇנְיֵ֣נוּ וְֽלַחֲצֵֽנוּ׃	Wherefore hidest thou thy face, and forgettest our affliction and our oppression?	ἱνατί τὸ πρόσωπόν σου ἀποστρέφεις; ἐπιλανθάνῃ τῆς πτωχείας ἡμῶν καὶ τῆς θλίψεως ἡμῶν;
25	כִּ֤י שָׁ֣חָה לֶעָפָ֣ר נַפְשֵׁ֑נוּ דָּבְקָ֖ה לָאָ֣רֶץ בִּטְנֵֽנוּ׃	For our soul is bowed down to the dust: our belly cleaveth unto the earth.	ὅτι ἐταπεινώθη εἰς χοῦν ἡ ψυχὴ ἡμῶν, ἐκολλήθη εἰς γῆν ἡ γαστὴρ ἡμῶν.
26	ק֭וּמָֽה עֶזְרָ֣תָה לָּ֑נוּ וּ֝פְדֵ֗נוּ לְמַ֣עַן חַסְדֶּֽךָ׃	Arise for our help, and redeem us for thy mercies' sake.	ἀνάστα, Κύριε, βοήθησον ἡμῖν καὶ λύτρωσαι ἡμᾶς ἕνεκεν τοῦ ὀνόματός σου.
