= Valley of Salt =

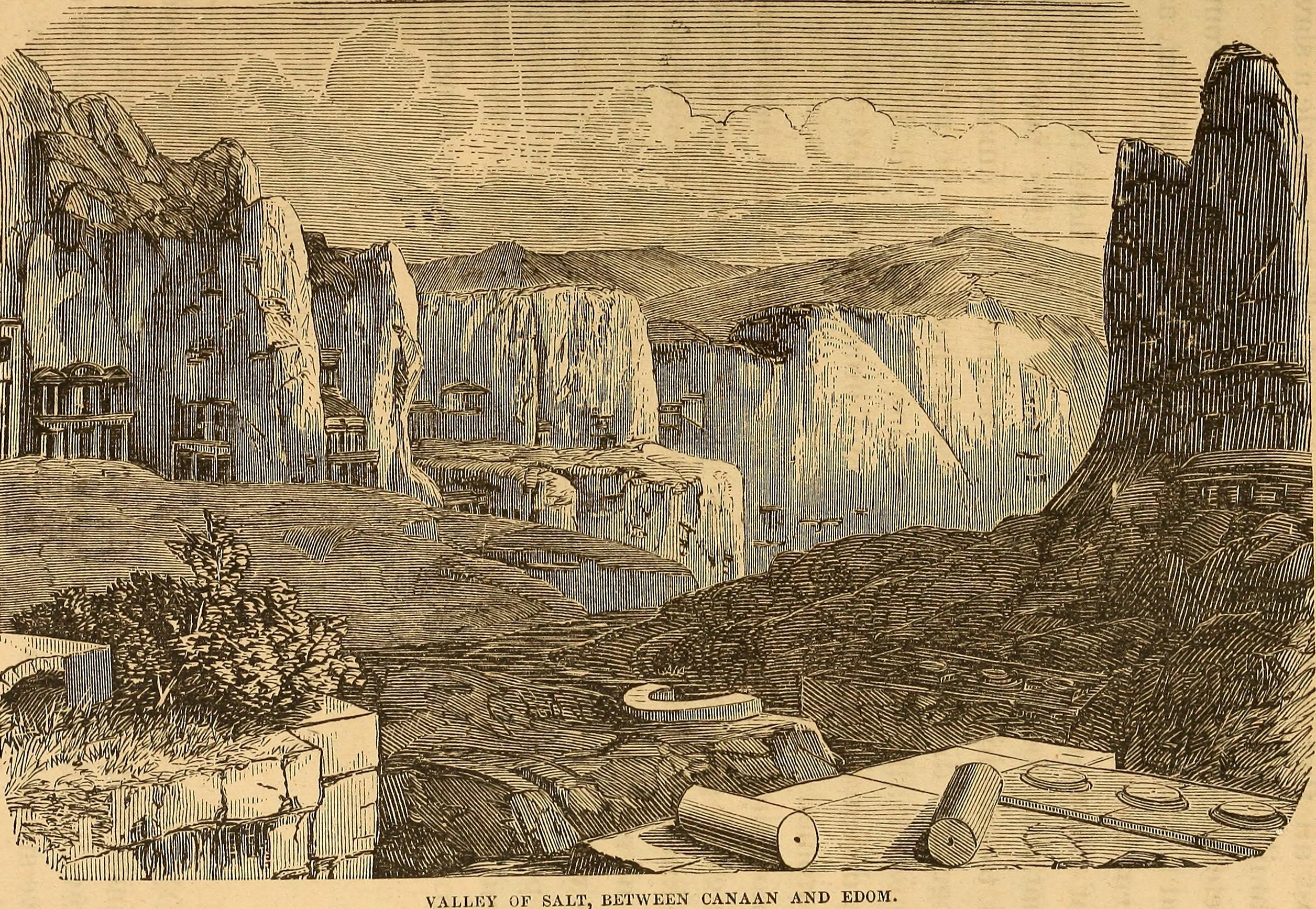
Valley of Salt, between Canaan and Edom

The Valley of Salt, valley of saltpits, valley of Saltpits, or vale of saltpits (Hebrew: גיא-המלח) is a place where David smote the Arameans (2 Sam. 8:13). This valley (the Arabah) is between Judah and Edom on the south of the Dead Sea. Hence some interpreters suggest the phrase, "and he smote Edom," instead of the "Arameans" in the above text. This confusion may be due to the Hebrew word Edom אדם being similar to the word Aram ארם. In Hebrew, the resh "ר" and the daleth "ד" are very similar and easily confused if not written carefully. It is conjectured that while David was leading his army against the Ammonites and Arameans, the Edomites invaded the south of Judah, and that David sent Joab or Abishai against them, who drove them back and finally subdued Edom. (Comp. title to Ps. 60 [Ps. 59 in the Septuagint].)

2 Samuel 8:13 - And David became famous after he returned from striking down eighteen thousand Arameans in the Valley of Salt. (New International Version)

Here also Amaziah "slew of Edom ten thousand men" (2 Kings 14:7; comp. 8: 20-22 and 2 Chr. 25:5-11).
