= Psalms =

Book of sacred songs in the Hebrew Bible

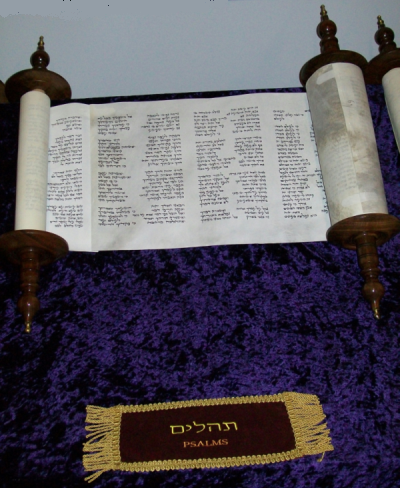
Scroll of the Psalms

The Book of Psalms (/sɑː(l)mz/ SAH(L)MZ, US also /sɔː(l)mz/; Biblical Hebrew: תְּהִלִּים, romanized: Tehillīm, lit. 'praises'; Ancient Greek: Ψαλμός, romanized: Psalmós; Latin: Liber Psalmorum; Arabic: مَزْمُور, romanized: Mazmūr, in Islam also called Zabur, Arabic: زَبُورُ, romanized: Zabūr), also known as the Psalter, is the first book of the third section of the Tanakh (Hebrew Bible) called Ketuvim ('Writings'), and a book of the Old Testament.

The book is an anthology of Hebrew religious hymns. In the Jewish and Western Christian traditions, there are 150 psalms, and several more in the Eastern Christian churches. The book is divided into five sections, each ending with a doxology, a hymn of praise. There are several types of psalms, including hymns or songs of praise, communal and individual laments, royal psalms, imprecation, and individual thanksgivings. The book also includes psalms of communal thanksgiving, wisdom, pilgrimage, and other categories.

Many of the psalms contain attributions to the name of King David and other Biblical figures, including Asaph, the sons of Korah, Moses, and Solomon. Davidic authorship of the Psalms is not accepted as a historical fact by modern scholars, who view it as a way to link biblical writings to well-known figures; while the dating of the Psalms is "notoriously difficult", some are considered preexilic and others postexilic. The Dead Sea Scrolls suggest that the ordering and content of the later psalms (Psalms 90–150) was not fixed as of the mid-1st century CE. Septuagint scholars, including Eugene Ulrich, have argued that the Hebrew Psalter was not closed until the 1st century CE.

The English-language title of the book derives from the Greek word psalmoi (ψαλμοί), meaning 'instrumental music', and by extension referring to "the words accompanying the music". Its Hebrew name, Tehillim (תהילים), means 'praises', as it contains many praises and supplications to God.

== Structure ==
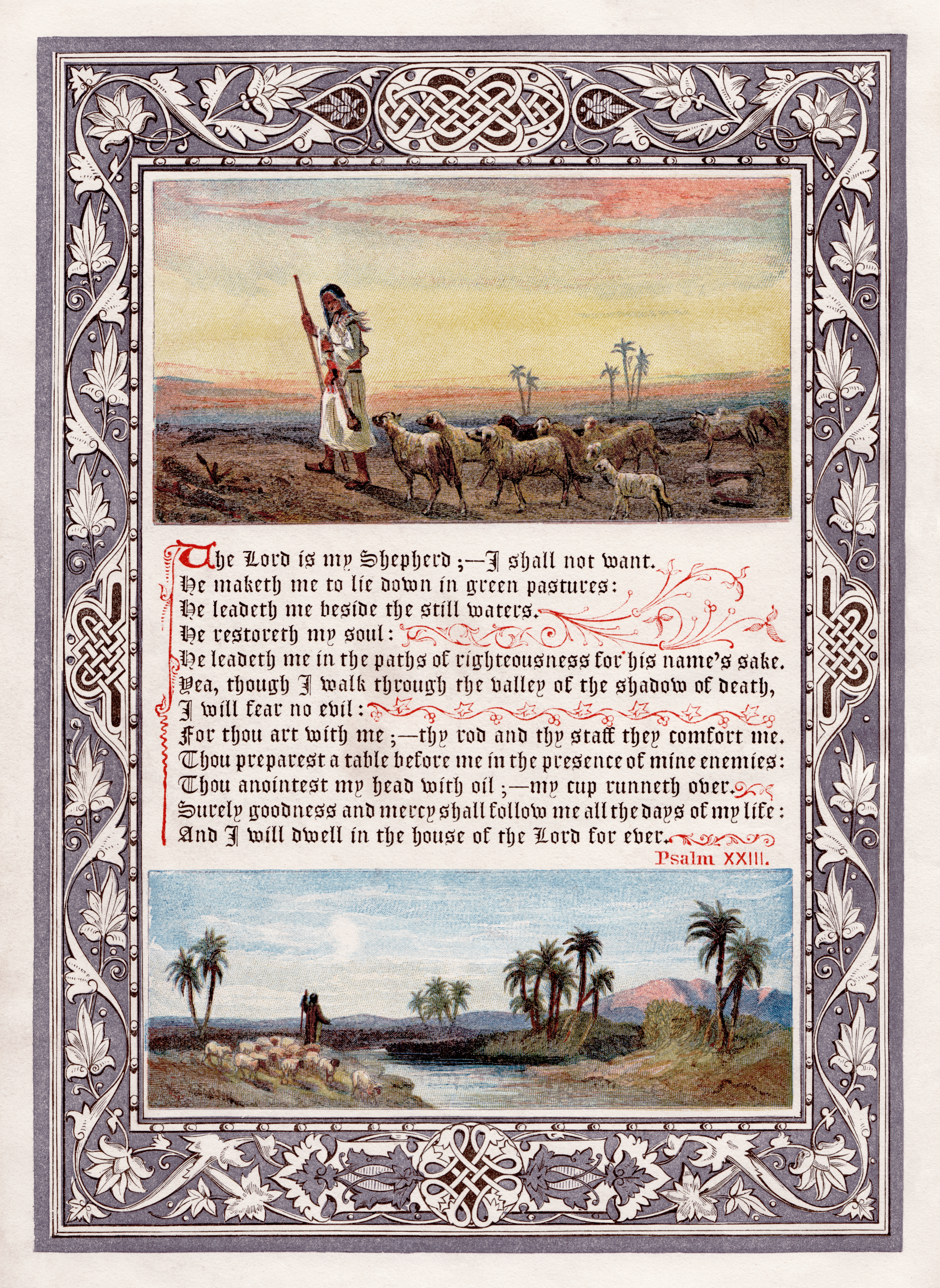
An 1880 Baxter process illustration of Psalm 23, from the Religious Tract Society's magazine The Sunday at Home

=== Sections ===
The Book of Psalms is divided into five sections, each closing with a doxology (i.e., a benediction). These divisions were probably introduced by the final editors to imitate the five-fold division of the Torah:

- Book 1 (Psalms 1–41)
- Book 2 (Psalms 42–72)
- Book 3 (Psalms 73–89)
- Book 4 (Psalms 90–106)
- Book 5 (Psalms 107–150)

=== Superscriptions ===
Many psalms (116 of the 150) have individual superscriptions (titles), ranging from lengthy comments to a single word. Over a third appear to be musical directions, addressed to the "leader" or "choirmaster", including such statements as "with stringed instruments" and "according to lilies". Others appear to be references to types of musical composition, such as "A psalm" and "Song", or regarding the occasion of the psalm ("On the dedication of the temple", "For the memorial offering", etc.). Many carry the names of individuals, the most common (73 psalms) being 'of David', and thirteen of these relate explicitly to incidents in the king's life. Others named include Asaph (12), the sons of Korah (11), Solomon (2), Moses (1), Ethan the Ezrahite (1), and Heman the Ezrahite (1). The Septuagint, the Peshitta (the Syriac Vulgate), and the Latin Vulgate each associate several Psalms (such as 111 and 145) with Haggai and Zechariah. The Septuagint also attributes several Psalms (like 112 and 135) to Ezekiel and Jeremiah.

=== Numbering ===
Hebrew numbering (Masoretic)	Greek numbering (Septuagint)
1–8	1–8
9–10	9
11–113	10–112
114–115	113
116	114–115
117–146	116–145
147	146–147
148–150	148–150

Psalms are usually identified by a sequence number, often preceded by the abbreviation "Ps." Numbering of the Psalms differs – mostly by one – between the Hebrew (Masoretic) and Greek (Septuagint) manuscripts. Protestant translations use the Hebrew numbering, but other Christian traditions vary:

- Catholic official liturgical texts, such as the Roman Missal, use the Greek numbering
- Modern Catholic translations often use the Hebrew numbering (noting the Greek number)
- Eastern Orthodox and Eastern Catholic translations use the Greek numbering (noting the Hebrew number)

The variance between Masorah and Septuagint texts in this numeration is likely due to a gradual neglect of the original poetic form of the Psalms; such neglect was occasioned by liturgical uses and carelessness of copyists. It is generally admitted that Psalms 9 and 10 (Hebrew numbering) were originally a single acrostic poem, wrongly separated by Massorah and rightly united by the Septuagint and the Vulgate. Psalms 42 and 43 (Hebrew numbering) are shown by identity of subject (yearning for the house of Yahweh), of metrical structure and of refrain (comparing Psalms 42:6, 12; 43:5, Hebrew numbering), to be three strophes of one and the same poem. The Hebrew text is correct in counting as one Psalm 146 and Psalm 147. Later liturgical usage would seem to have split up these and several other psalms. Zenner combines into what he deems the original choral odes: Psalms 1, 2, 3, 4; 6 + 13; 9 + 10; 19, 20, 21; 56 + 57; 69 + 70; 114 + 115; 148, 149, 150. A choral ode would seem to have been the original form of Psalms 14 and 70. The two strophes and the epode are Psalm 14; the two antistrophes are Psalm 70. It is noteworthy that, on the breaking up of the original ode, each portion crept twice into the Psalter: Psalm 14 = 53, Psalm 70 = 40:14–18. Other such duplicated portions of psalms are Psalm 108:2–6 = Psalm 57:8–12; Psalm 108:7–14 = Psalm 60:7–14; Psalm 71:1–3 = Psalm 31:2–4. This loss of the original form of some of the psalms is considered by the Catholic Church's Pontifical Biblical Commission (1 May 1910) to have been due to liturgical practices, neglect by copyists, or other causes.

Verse numbers were first printed in 1509. Different traditions exist whether to include the original heading into the counting or not. This leads to inconsistent numbering in 62 psalms, with an offset of 1, sometimes even 2 verses.

=== Additional psalms ===
The Septuagint, present in Eastern Orthodox churches, includes a Psalm 151; a Hebrew version of this was found in the Psalms Scroll of the Dead Sea Scrolls. Some versions of the Peshitta (the Bible used in Syriac churches mainly in the Middle East) include Psalms 152–155. There are also the Psalms of Solomon, which are a further 18 psalms of Jewish origin, likely originally written in Hebrew, but surviving only in Greek and Syriac translation. These and other indications suggest that the current Western Christian and Jewish collection of 150 psalms was selected from a wider set.

== Primary types ==
Hermann Gunkel's pioneering form-critical work on the psalms sought to provide a new and meaningful context in which to interpret individual psalms—not by looking at their literary context within the Psalter (which he did not see as significant), but by bringing together psalms of the same genre (Gattung) from throughout the Psalter. Gunkel divided the psalms into five primary types:

=== Hymns ===
Hymns are songs of praise for God's work in creation or history. They typically open with a call to praise, describe the motivation for praise, and conclude with a repetition of the call. Two sub-categories are "enthronement psalms" celebrating the enthronement of Yahweh as king, and "Zion psalms" glorifying Mount Zion, God's dwelling-place in Jerusalem. Gunkel also described a special subset of "eschatological hymns" which includes themes of future restoration (Psalm 126) or of judgment (Psalm 82).

=== Communal laments ===
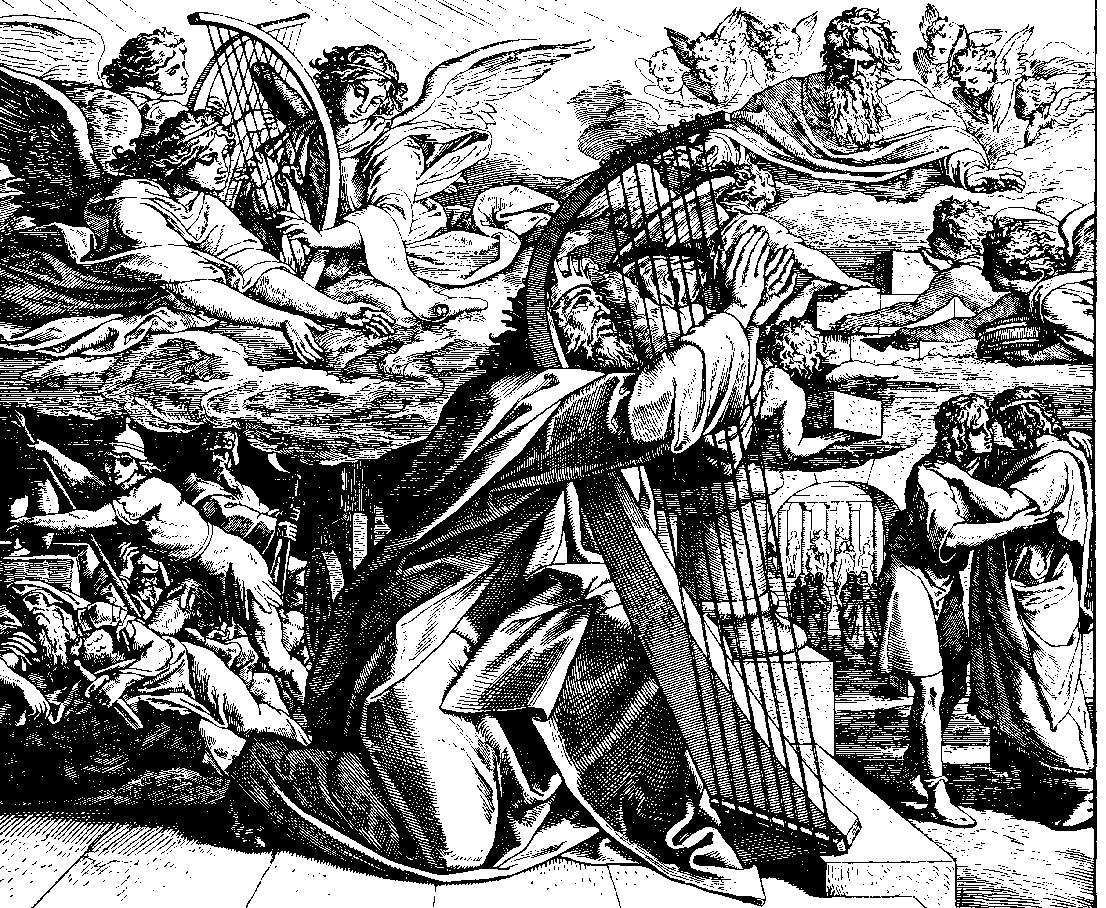
David is depicted giving a psalm to pray for deliverance in this 1860 woodcut by Julius Schnorr von Karolsfeld

Communal laments are psalms in which the nation laments some communal disaster. Both communal and individual laments typically but not always include the following elements:

1. address to God,
2. description of suffering,
3. cursing of the party responsible for the suffering,
4. protestation of innocence or admission of guilt,
5. petition for divine assistance,
6. faith in God's receipt of prayer,
7. anticipation of divine response, and
8. a song of thanksgiving.

In general, the individual and communal subtypes can be distinguished by the use of the singular "I" or the plural "we". However, the "I" could also be characterising an individual's personal experience that was reflective of the entire community.

=== Royal psalms ===
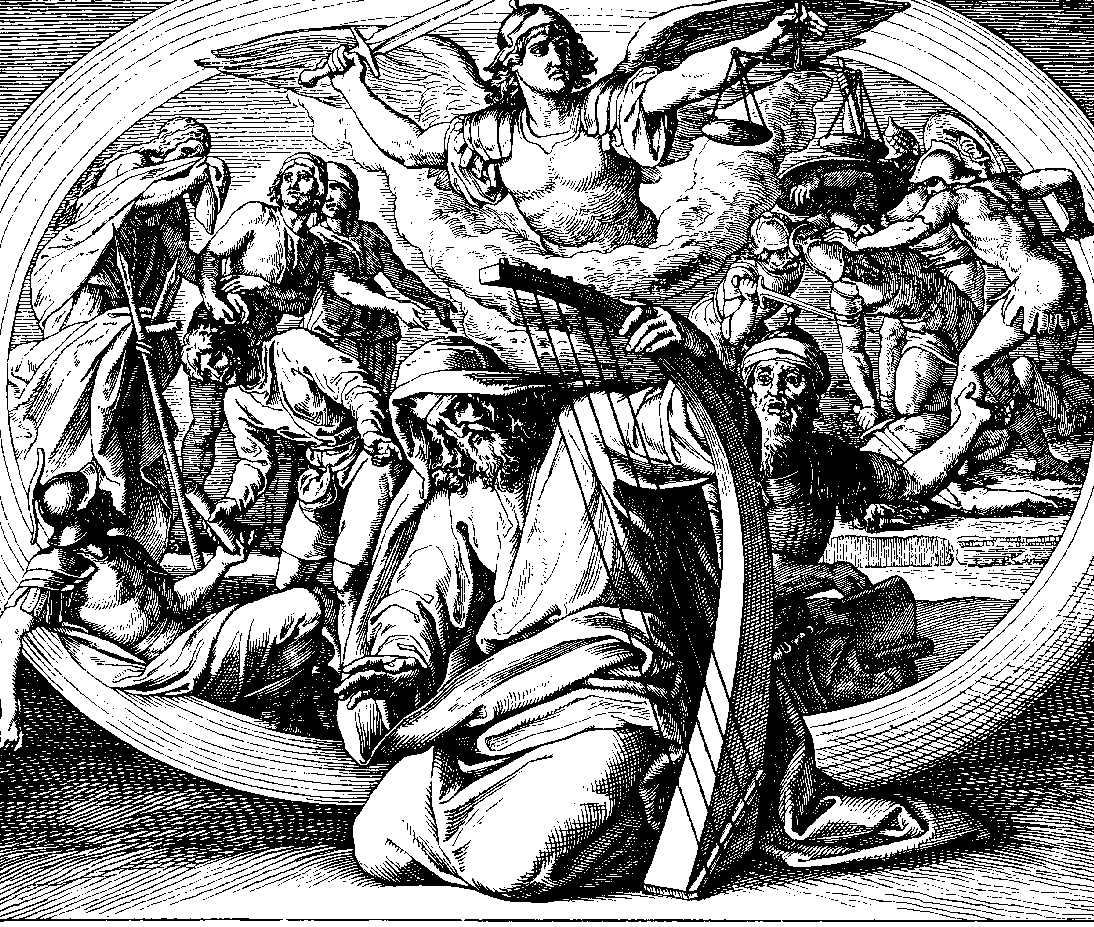
David is depicted giving a penitential psalm in this 1860 woodcut by Julius Schnorr von Karolsfeld

Royal psalms deal with such matters as the king's coronation, marriage, and battles. None of them mentions any specific king by name, and their origin and use remain obscure; several psalms, especially Psalms 93–99, concern the kingship of God, and might relate to an annual ceremony in which Yahweh would be ritually reinstated as king.

=== Individual laments ===
Individual laments are psalms lamenting the fate of the psalmist. By far the most common type of psalm, they typically open with an invocation of God, followed by the lament itself and pleas for help, and often ending with an expression of confidence.

=== Individual thanksgiving psalms ===
In individual thanksgiving psalms, the opposite of individual laments, the psalmist thanks God for deliverance from personal distress.

In addition to these five major genres, Gunkel also recognised a number of minor psalm-types, including:

- communal thanksgiving psalms, in which the whole nation thanks God for deliverance;
- wisdom psalms, reflecting the Hebrew Biblical (Old Testament) wisdom literature;
- pilgrimage psalms, sung by pilgrims on their way to Jerusalem;
- entrance and prophetic liturgies; and
- A group of mixed psalms could not be assigned to any category.

== Composition ==
=== Origins ===
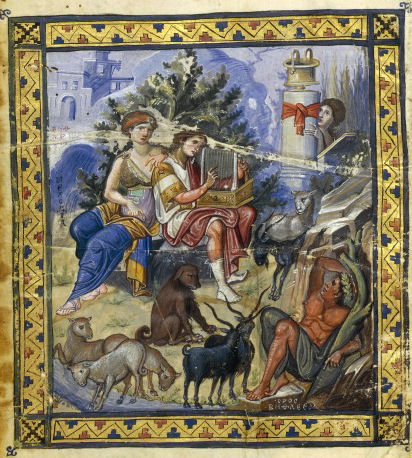
David composing the Psalms, Paris Psalter, 10th century

The composition of the psalms spans at least five centuries, from Psalm 29's composition in the 10th century BCE to others clearly from the post-Exilic period (i.e., not earlier than the 5th century BCE). The majority originated in the southern kingdom of Judah and were associated with the Temple in Jerusalem, where they probably functioned as librettos during Temple worship. Exactly how they did so was unclear, but there are indications in some of them: "Bind the festal procession with branches, up to the horns of the altar" suggests a connection with sacrifices, and "Let my prayer be set forth before you as incense" suggests a connection with the offering of incense.

According to Jewish tradition, the Book of Psalms was composed by the First Man (Adam), Melchizedek, Abraham, Moses, David, Solomon, Heman, Jeduthun, Asaph, and the three sons of Korah. According to Abraham ibn Ezra, the final redaction of the book was made by the Men of the Great Assembly.

=== Influences ===
Some of the psalms show influences from related earlier texts from the region; examples include various Ugaritic texts and the Babylonian Enūma Eliš. These influences may be either of background similarity or of contrast. For example, Psalm 29 shares characteristics with Canaanite religious poetry and themes. Robert Alter points out that the address to "sons of God" at the opening "[is] best thought of [as] the flickering literary afterlife of a polytheistic mythology" but that "belief in them...is unlikely to have been shared by the scribal circles that produced Psalms". The contrast between the Psalmist's theology and the surrounding area's polytheistic religion is well seen in Psalms 104:26, in which locals' mythical fierce sea-god—such as the Babylonian Tiamat, Canaanite Yam and the Leviathan which also appears in the Hebrew Bible—is "reduced to an aquatic pet with whom YHWH can play".

=== Poetic characteristics ===
The biblical poetry of Psalms uses parallelism as its primary poetic device. Parallelism is a kind of symmetry in which restatement, synonym, amplification, grammatical repetition, or opposition develops an idea. Synonymous parallelism involves two lines expressing essentially the same idea. An example of synonymous parallelism:

- "The LORD is my light and my salvation; whom shall I fear? The LORD is the stronghold of my life; of whom shall I be afraid?" (Psalm 27:1).

Two lines expressing opposites are known as antithetic parallelism. An example of antithetic parallelism:

- "And he led them in a cloud by day/ and all the night by a fiery light" (Psalm 78:14).

Two clauses expressing the idea of amplifying the first claim are known as expansive parallelism. An example of expansive parallelism:

- "My mouth is filled with your praise/ all the day with your lauding" (Psalm 71:8).

=== Editorial agenda ===
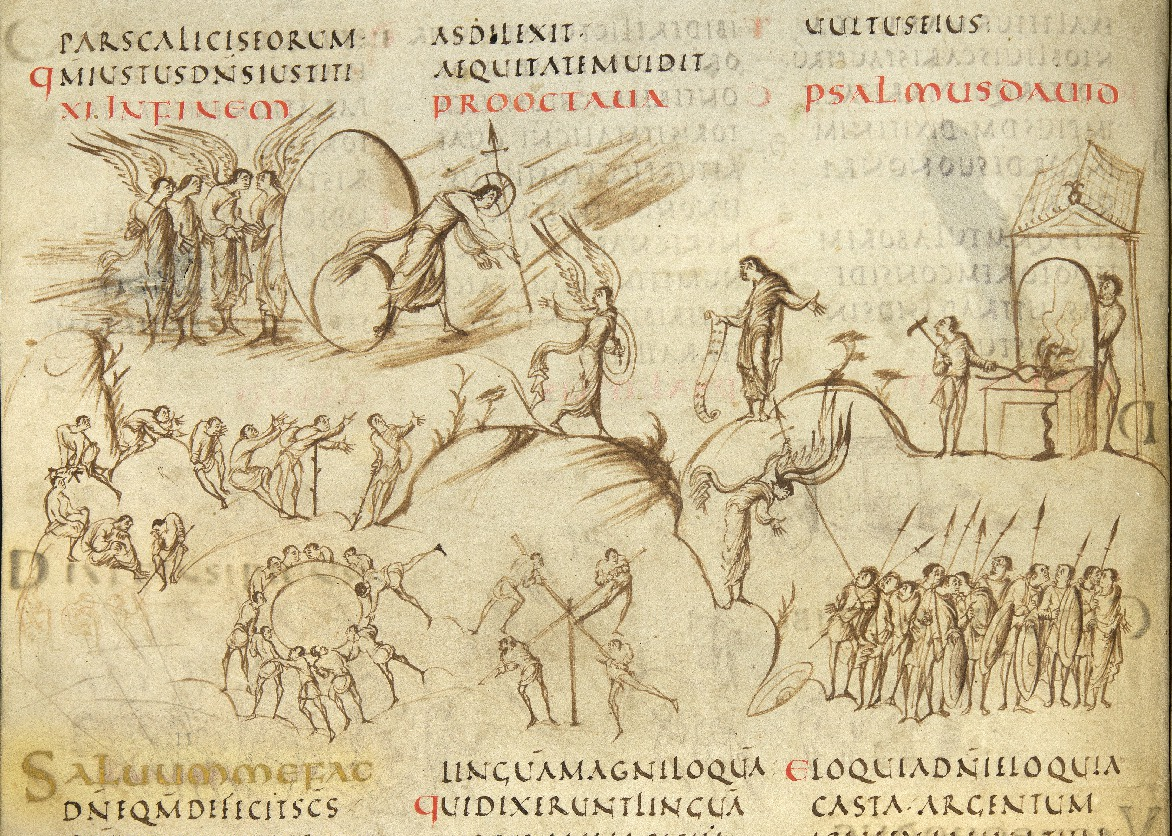
Psalm 11 in the ninth-century Utrecht Psalter, where the illustration of the text is often literal

Many scholars believe the individual Psalms were redacted into a single collection during the Second Temple period. It had long been recognized that the collection bore the imprint of an underlying message or metanarrative, but that this message remained concealed, as Augustine of Hippo said, "The sequence of the Psalms seems to me to contain the secret of a mighty mystery, but its meaning has not been revealed to me" (Enarr. on Psalms 150:1). Others pointed out the presence of concatenation—that is, adjacent Psalms sharing similar words and themes. In time, this approach developed into recognizing overarching themes shared by whole groups of psalms.

In 1985, Gerald H. Wilson's The Editing of the Hebrew Psalter proposed—by parallel with other ancient Near Eastern hymn collections—that psalms at the beginning and end (or "seams") of the five books of Psalms have thematic significance, corresponding in particular with the placement of the royal psalms. He pointed out that there was a progression of ideas from adversity through the crux of the collection in the apparent failure of the covenant in Psalm 89, leading to a concert of praise at the end. He concluded that the collection was redacted to be a retrospective of the failure of the Davidic covenant, exhorting Israel to trust in God alone in a non-messianic future. Walter Brueggemann suggested that the underlying editorial purpose was oriented instead towards wisdom or sapiential concerns, addressing the issues of how to live the life of faith. Psalm 1 calls the reader to a life of obedience; Psalm 73 (Brueggemann's crux psalm) faces the crisis when divine faithfulness is in doubt; Psalm 150 represents faith's triumph when God is praised not for his rewards but for his being. In 1997, David. C. Mitchell's The Message of the Psalter took a quite different line. Building on the work of Wilson and others, Mitchell proposed that the Psalter embodies an eschatological timetable like that of Zechariah 9–14. This programme includes the ingathering of exiled Israel by a bridegroom-king; his establishment of a kingdom; his violent death; Israel scattered in the wilderness, regathered and again imperiled, and then rescued by a king from the heavens, who establishes his kingdom from Zion, brings peace and prosperity to the earth and receives the homage of the nations.

These three views—Wilson's non-messianic retrospective of the Davidic covenant, Brueggemann's sapiential instruction, and Mitchell's eschatological-messianic program—all have their followers. However, the sapiential agenda has been somewhat eclipsed by the other two. Shortly before he died in 2005, Wilson modified his position to allow for the existence of messianic prophecy within the Psalms' redactional agenda. Mitchell's position remains essentially unchanged, but he now sees the issue as identifying when the historical beginning of the Psalms turns to eschatology.

James Vander Kam's The Dead Sea Scrolls Today examined the large Psalms scroll from Qumran, 11QPs(a), showing that while the early 1st century CE largely fixed the first three books (Psalms 1–89), Psalms 90–150 show variations in ordering and content, suggesting the collection was still being finalized into the mid-1st century CE and included material not found in the later Masoretic Text. Peter Flint argues that the findings show there were three different versions of the Psalter circulating during the Second Temple period, with the Masoretic version being attested among the scrolls found at Masada.

== The ancient music of the Psalms ==
The Psalms were written not merely as poems, but as songs to be sung. According to Bible exegete Saadia Gaon (882–942) who served in the geonate of Babylonian Jewry, the Psalms were originally sung in the Temple precincts by the Levites, based on what was prescribed for each psalm (lineage of the singers, designated time and place, instruments used, manner of execution, etc.), but are permitted to be randomly read by anyone at any time and in any place. More than a third of the psalms are addressed to the Director of Music. Some psalms exhort the worshipper to sing (e.g., Pss. 33:1–3; 92:1–3; 96:1–3; 98:1; 101:1; 150). Some headings denote the musical instruments on which the psalm should be played (Pss. 4, 5, 6, 8, 67). Some refer to the Levites who sang one of eight melodies, one of which was known simply as "the eighth" (Hebrew: sheminit) (Pss. 6, 12) . And others preserve the name for ancient eastern modes, like ayelet ha-shachar (hind of the dawn; Ps. 22); shoshanim / shushan (lilies / lily; Pss. 45; 60), said to be describing a certain melody; or ʻalmuth / ʻalamoth (mute; Pss. 9, 46), which, according to Saadia Gaon, is "a silent melody, nearly inaudible."

Despite the frequently heard view that their ancient music is lost, the means to reconstruct it are still extant. Fragments of temple psalmody are preserved in ancient synagogue and church chant, particularly in the tonus peregrinus melody to Psalm 114. Cantillation signs, to record the melody sung, were in use since ancient times; evidence of them can be found in the manuscripts of the oldest extant copies of Psalms in the Dead Sea Scrolls and are even more extensive in the Masoretic Text, which dates to the Early Middle Ages and whose Tiberian scribes claimed to be basing their work on temple-period signs. (See Moshe ben Asher's 'Song of the Vine' colophon to the Codex Cairensis).

Several attempts have been made to decode the Masoretic cantillation, but the most "successful" is that of Suzanne Haïk-Vantoura (1928–2000) in the last quarter of the 20th century. Her reconstruction assumes the signs represent the degrees of various musical scales—that is, individual notes—which puts it at odds with all other existing traditions, where the signs invariably represent melodic motifs; it also takes no account of the existence of older systems of notation, such as the Babylonian and Palestinian systems. Musicologists have therefore rejected Haïk-Vantoura's theories, with her results dubious and her methodology flawed. In spite of this, Mitchell has repeatedly defended it, showing that, when applied to the Masoretic cantillation of Psalm 114, it produces a melody recognizable as the tonus peregrinus of church and synagogue. Mitchell includes musical transcriptions of the temple psalmody of Psalms 120–134 in his commentary on the Songs of Ascents.

== Views on the division into five books ==
In "The Flow of the Psalms", O. Palmer Robertson posits a thematic progression throughout the five books of Psalms, delineating distinctive characteristics and emphases:

Book 1: Opposition – Predominantly attributed to David, these Psalms are perceived as the earliest in origin, characterized by a focus on trust in God, with Yahweh as the dominant name.

Book 2: Communication – Despite continued opposition, this book reflects an outreach even to enemies of God. The prevalent name for God shifts to Elohim, especially when borrowing sections from Book 1. Robertson suggests Book 2 may have Northern Kingdom origins.

Book 3: Devastation – Marked by the overtaking of Jerusalem, this book holds out hope for Jacob and Joseph, possibly symbolizing the Southern and Northern kingdoms. Expressions like "trust in God" diminish.

Book 4: Maturity – Notably, with over 10 quotes from Chronicles, indicating a temporal progression beyond the initial three books.

Book 5: Consummation – Robertson proposes that the Psalms of Ascent and Hallel Psalms are post-Babylonian exile compositions, portraying a culmination of themes and perspectives.

== Themes and execution ==
Most individual psalms involve the praise of God for his power and beneficence, for his creation of the world, and for his past acts of deliverance for Israel. They envision a world in which everyone and everything will praise God, and God in turn will hear their prayers and respond. Sometimes God "hides his face" and refuses to respond, questioning (for the psalmist) the relationship between God and prayer which is the underlying assumption of the Book of Psalms.

Some psalms are called maskil (or maschil), meaning 'enlightened' or 'wise saying', because they impart wisdom. Most notable of these is Psalm 142 which is sometimes called the "Maskil of David"; others include Psalm 32 and Psalm 78.

A special grouping and division in the Book of Psalms are fifteen psalms (Psalms 120–134) known in the construct case, shir ha-ma'aloth ("A Song of Ascents", "A Song of degrees"), and one as shir la-ma'aloth (Psalm 121). According to Saadia Gaon, these songs differed from the other psalms in that they were to be sung by the Levites in a "loud melody" (Judeo-Arabic: בלחן מרתפע). Every psalm designated for Asaph (e.g. Psalms 50, 73–83) was sung by his descendants while making use of cymbals, in accordance with 1 Chronicles 16:5. Every psalm wherein is found the introductory phrase "Upon Mahalath" (e.g. Psalms 53 and 88) was sung by the Levites by using large percussion instruments having wide and closed bezels on both sides and beaten with two wooden sticks.

O. Palmer Robertson observes that many of the Psalms concern the subject of death and says "This unnatural conclusion to every human life can be understood only in the context of the original threat to the original man: 'in the day you shall eat of it you shall surely die.'" Robertson goes on to say "The anticipation from redemption from the grave overcomes the inevitability of death. The psalmist is fully aware of his need for total deliverance from the last great enemy, and attests to expectation of deliverance."

== Later interpretation and influence ==
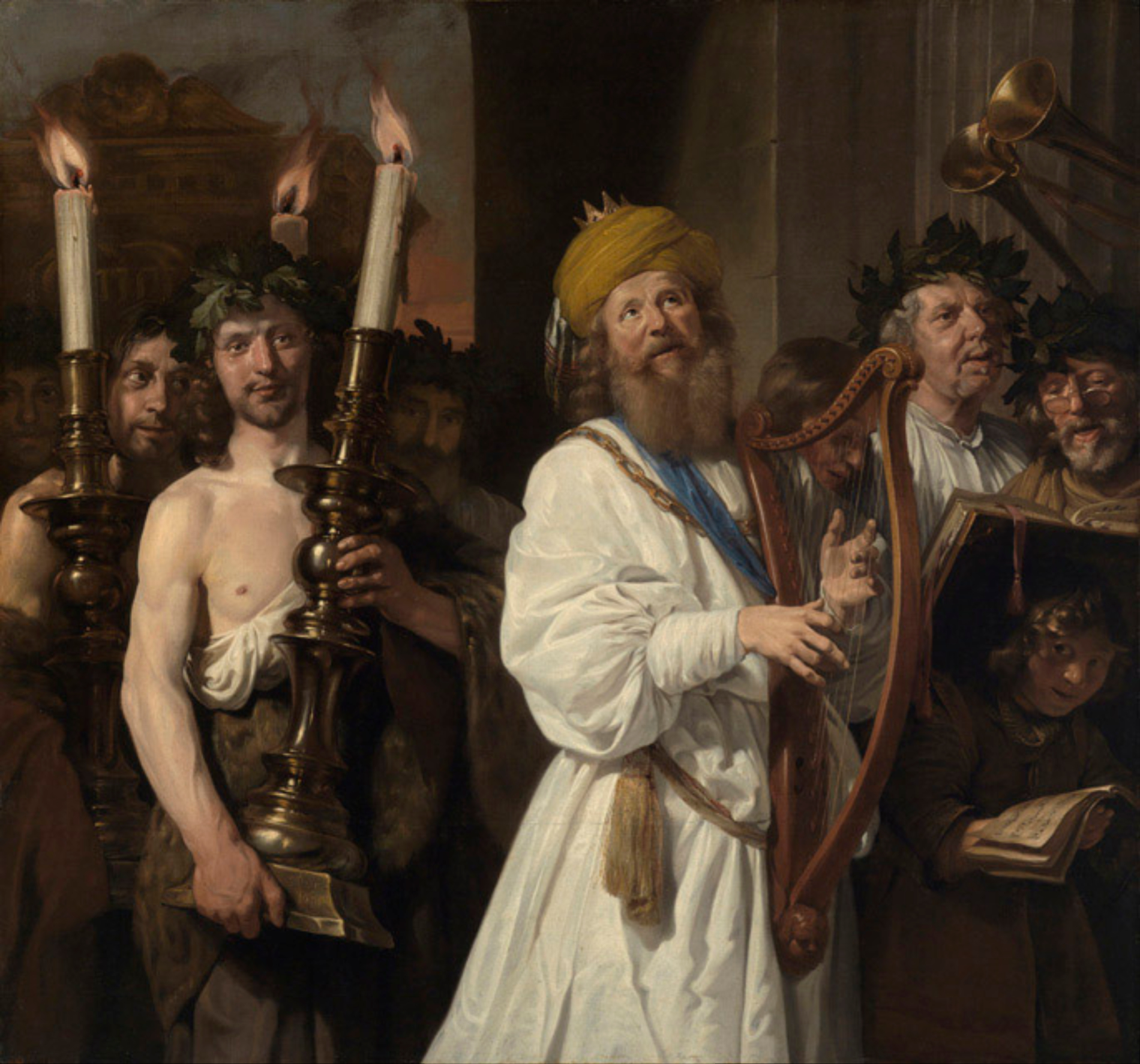
David Playing the Harp by Jan de Bray, 1670

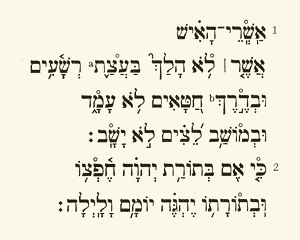
Hebrew text of Psalm 1:1–2

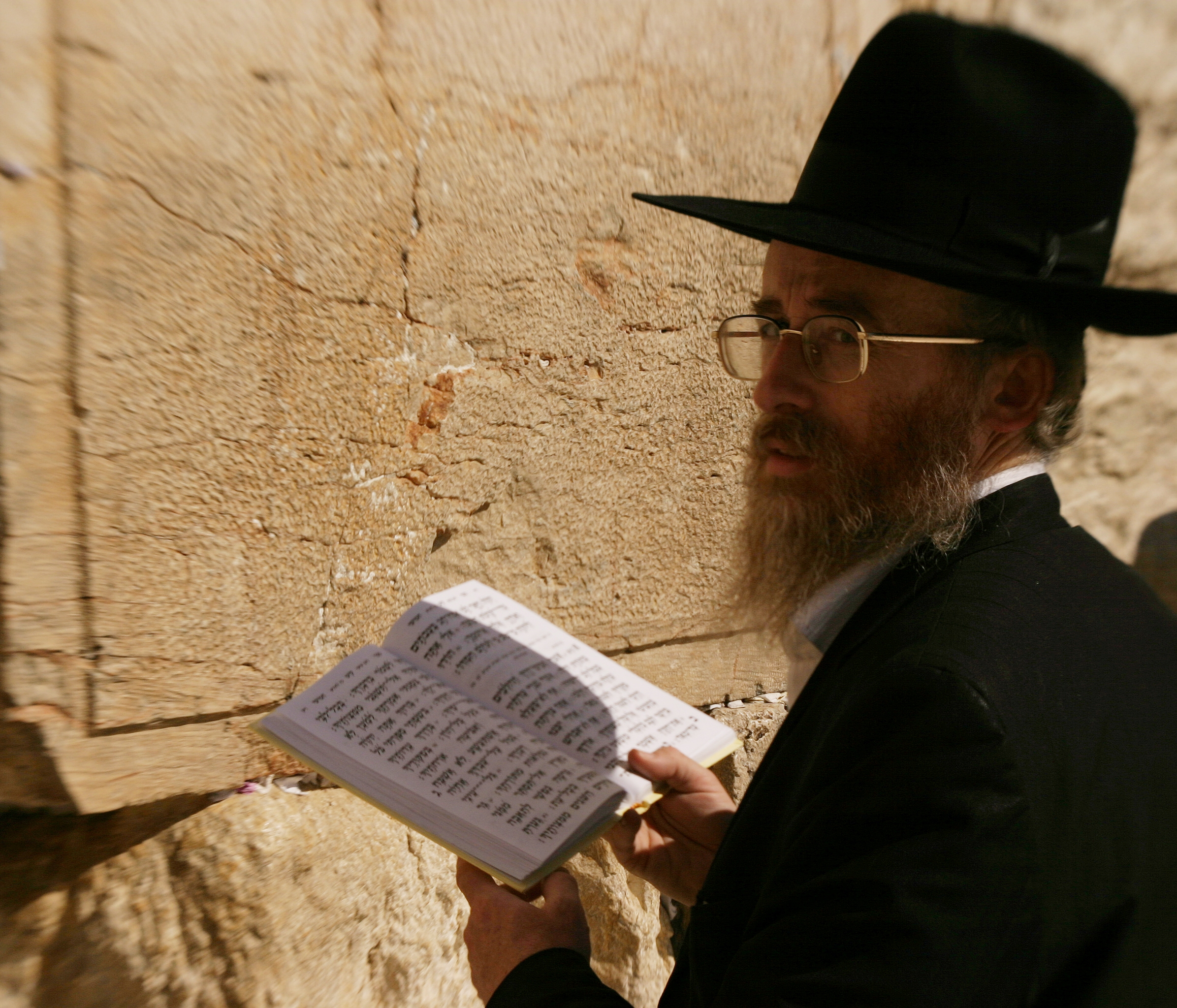
A Jewish man reads Psalm 119 at the Western Wall.

=== Overview ===
Individual psalms were originally hymns, to be used on various occasions and at various sacred sites; later, some were anthologised, and might have been understood within the various anthologies (e.g., Psalm 123 as one of the Psalms of Ascent). Finally, individual psalms might be understood within the Psalter as a whole, either narrating the life of David or providing instruction like the Torah. In later Jewish and Christian tradition, the Psalms have come to be used as prayers, either individual or communal, as traditional expressions of religious feeling.

=== Commentaries ===
Many authors have commented on the Psalms, including:

- Hilary of Poitiers
- Augustine of Hippo
- Saadia Gaon
- Salmon ben Jeroham
- Yefet ben Ali
- Rashbam
- Abraham ibn Ezra
- David Kimhi
- Obadiah ben Jacob Sforno
- Joseph ben Abraham Gikatilla
- Joseph Kara
- John Chrysostom
- Benjamin ben Judah
- Rashi
- Menachem Meiri
- Isaiah di Trani
- Thomas Aquinas
- John Calvin
- Emmanuel (pseudonym), Jewish Commentary on the Psalms.
- Isaac Satanow

=== Use in Jewish ritual ===
Some of the titles given to the Psalms have descriptions which suggest their use in worship:

- Some bear the Hebrew description shir (שיר; Greek: ᾠδή, ōdḗ, 'song'). Thirteen have this description. It means the 'flow of speech', as it were, in a straight line or in a regular strain. This description includes secular as well as sacred songs.
- Fifty-eight Psalms bear the description mizmor (מזמור; ψαλμός, psalmos, 'psalm'), a lyric ode set to music; a sacred song accompanied with a musical instrument.
- Psalm 145 alone has the designation tehillah (תהלה; ὕμνος, hymnos, 'hymn'), meaning a song of praise; a song the prominent thought of which is the praise of God.
- Thirteen psalms are described as maskil ('wise'): 32, 42, 44, 45, 52–55, 74, 78, 88, 89, and 142. Psalm 41:2, although not in the above list, has the description ashrei maskil.
- Six Psalms (16, 56–60) have the title michtam (מכתם, 'gold'). Rashi suggests that michtam refers to an item that a person carries with him at all times, hence, these Psalms contain concepts or ideas that are pertinent at every stage and setting throughout life, deemed vital as part of day-to-day spiritual awareness.
- Psalm 7 (along with Habakkuk 3) bears the title shigayon (שיגיון). There are three interpretations: (a) According to Rashi and others, this term stems from the root shegaga, meaning "mistake"—David committed some sin and is singing in the form of a prayer to redeem himself from it; (b) shigayon was a type of musical instrument; (c) Ibn Ezra considers the word to mean "longing", as for example in the verse in Proverbs 5:19 tishge tamid.

Psalms are used throughout traditional Jewish worship. Many complete Psalms and verses from Psalms appear in Shacharit. The pesukei dezimra component incorporates Psalms 30, 100, and 145–150. Psalm 145 (commonly referred to as "Ashrei", which is really the first word of two verses appended to the beginning of the Psalm), is read three times every day: once in shacharit as part of pesukei dezimrah, as mentioned; once, along with Psalm 20, as part of the morning's concluding prayers; and once at the start of the afternoon service. On festival days and Shabbatot, instead of concluding the morning service, it precedes the Mussaf service. Psalms 95–99, 29, 92, and 93, along with some later readings, comprise the introduction (Kabbalat Shabbat) to the Friday night service. Traditionally, a different "Psalm for the Day"—Shir shel yom—is read after Shacharit each day of the week (starting Sunday, Psalms: 24, 48, 82, 94, 81, 93, 92). This is described in the Mishnah (the initial codification of the Jewish oral tradition) in the tractate Tamid. According to the Talmud, the Levites originally recited these daily Psalms in the Temple in Jerusalem on that day of the week. From Rosh Chodesh Elul until Hoshanah Rabbah, Psalm 27 is recited twice daily following the morning and evening services. There is a Minhag (custom) to recite Psalm 30 each morning of Chanukkah after Shacharit: some recite this in place of the regular "Psalm for the Day", others recite this additionally.

When a Jew dies, a watch is kept over the body and tehillim (Psalms) are recited constantly by sun or candlelight, until the burial service. Historically, this watch would be carried out by the immediate family, usually in shifts, but in contemporary practice this service is provided by an employee of the funeral home or chevra kadisha.

Many Jews complete the Book of Psalms on a weekly or monthly basis. Each week, some also say a Psalm connected to that week's events or the Torah portion read during that week. In addition, many Jews (notably Lubavitch, and other Chasidim) read the entire Book of Psalms prior to the morning service, on the Sabbath preceding the calculated appearance of the new moon.

The reading of psalms is viewed in Jewish tradition as a vehicle for gaining God's favor. They are thus often specially recited in times of trouble, such as poverty, disease, or physical danger; in many synagogues, Psalms are recited after services for the security of the State of Israel. Sefer ha-Chinuch states that this practice is designed not to achieve favor, as such, but rather to inculcate belief in Divine Providence into one's consciousness, consistently with Maimonides' general view on Providence. (Relatedly, the Hebrew verb for prayer, hitpalal התפלל, is in fact the reflexive form of palal פלל, to intervene, petition, judge. Thus, "to pray" conveys the connotation of "judging oneself": ultimately, the purpose of prayer—tefilah תפלה—is to transform ourselves.)

=== In Christian prayer and worship ===
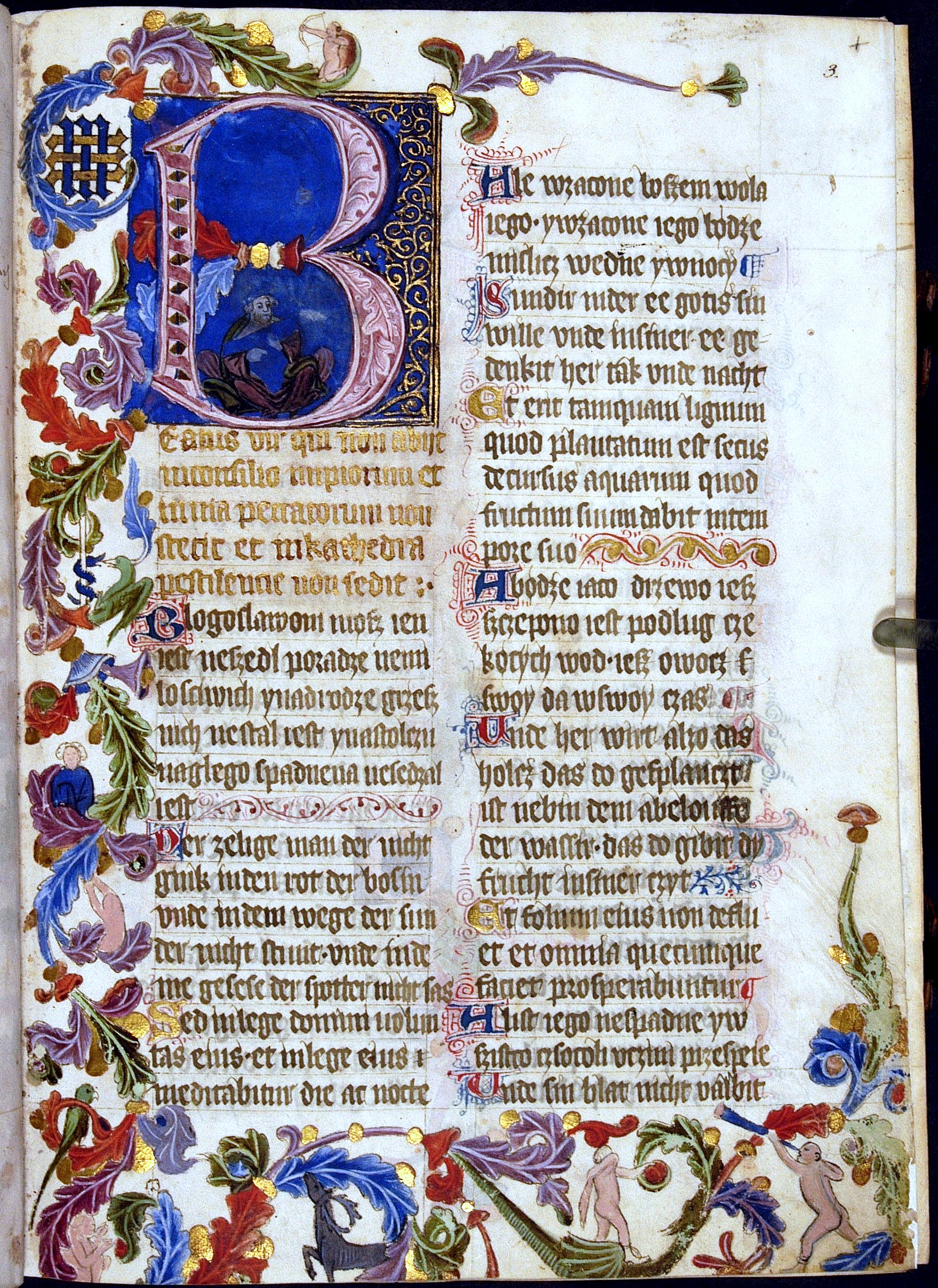
St. Florian's psalter, 14th or 15th century, Polish translation

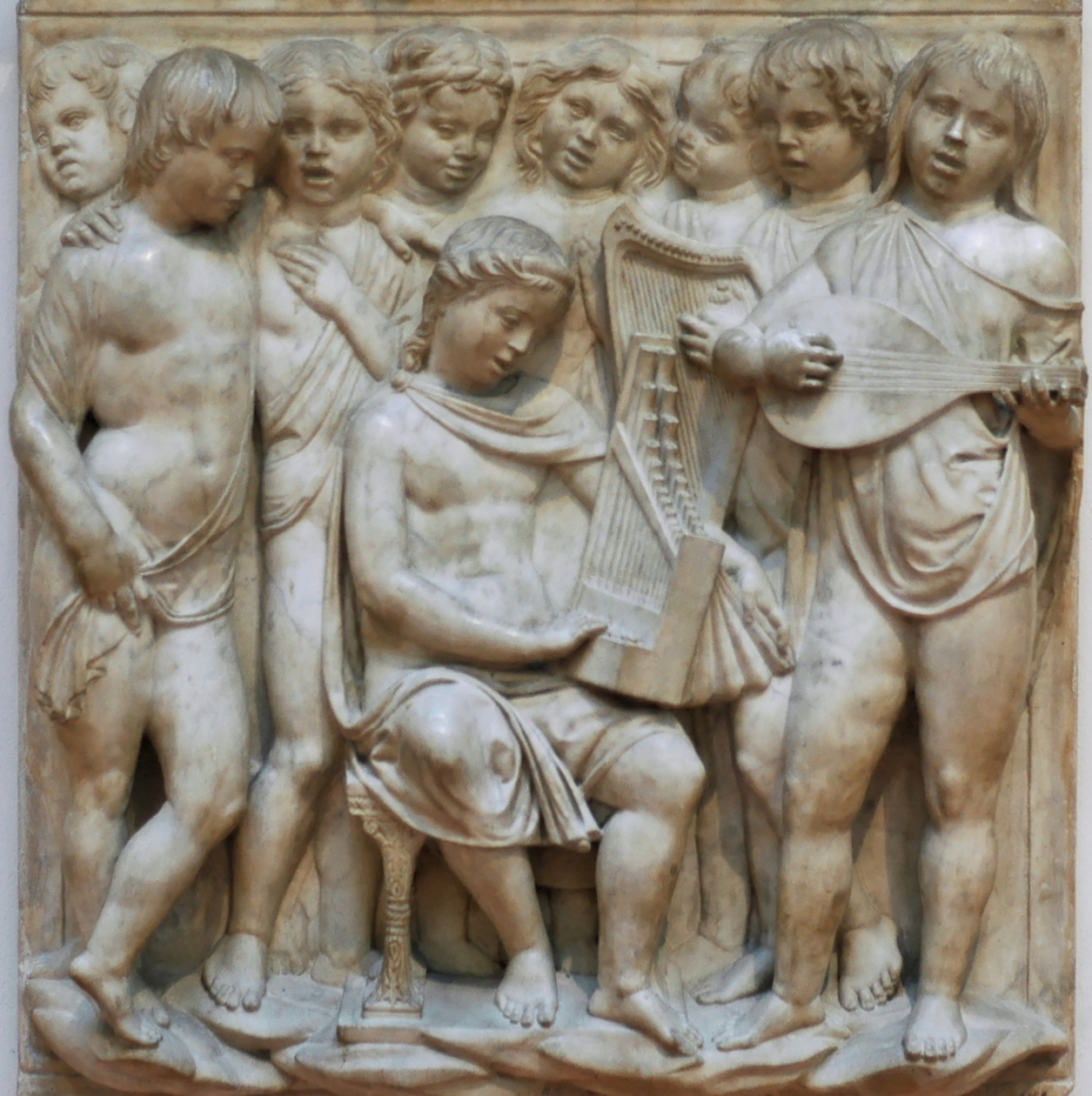
Children singing and playing music, illustration of Psalm 150 (Laudate Dominum)

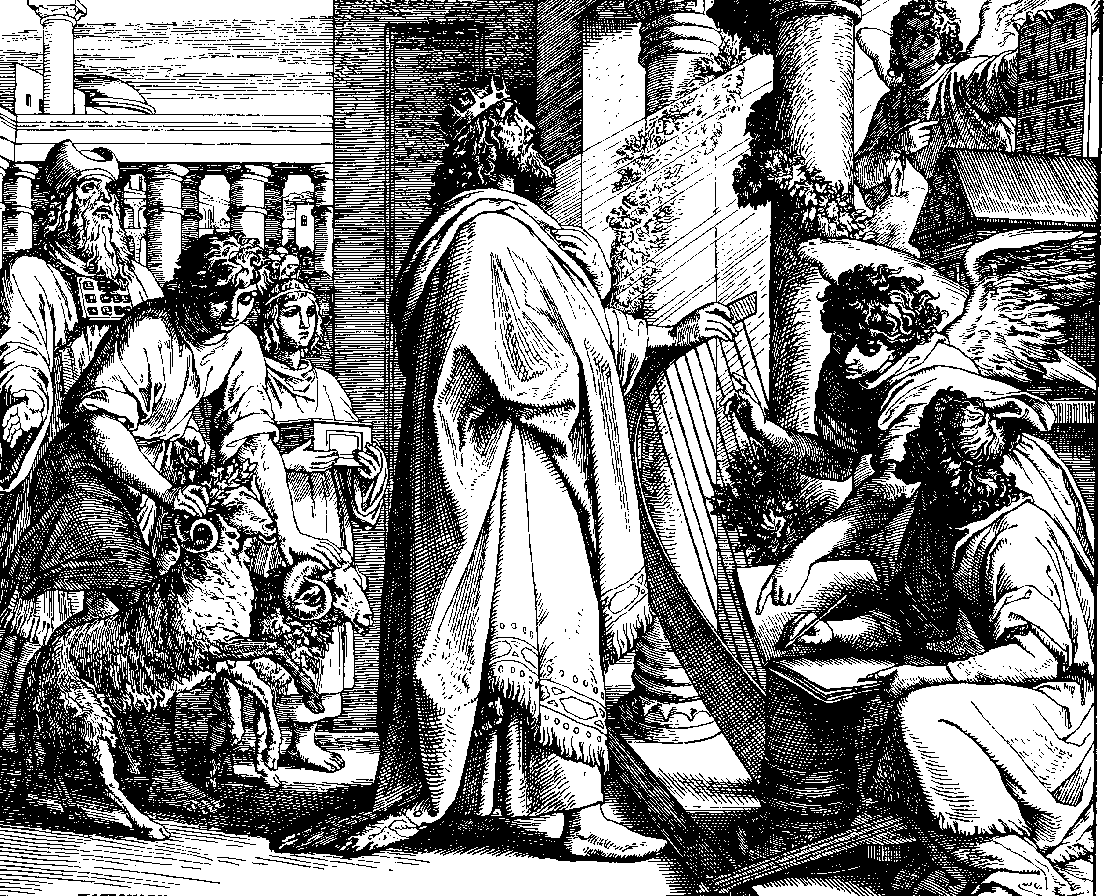
David is depicted as a psalmist in this 1860 woodcut by Julius Schnorr von Karolsfeld

New Testament references show that the earliest Christians used the Psalms in worship, and the Psalms have remained an important part of worship in most Christian Churches. The Eastern Orthodox, Catholic, Continental Reformed Protestantism, Presbyterian, Lutheran and Anglican Churches have always made systematic use of the Psalms, with a cycle for the recitation of all or most of them over the course of one or more weeks. For example, in the United Reformed Churches in North America, the Psalms have the “principle place”—although not exclusive—in singing. In the early centuries of the Church, it was expected that any candidate for bishop would be able to recite the entire Psalter from memory, something they often learned automatically during their time as monks. Christians have used Pater Noster cords of 150 beads to pray the entire Psalter.

Paul the Apostle quotes psalms (specifically Psalms 14 and 53, which are nearly identical) as the basis for his theory of original sin, and includes the scripture in the Epistle to the Romans, chapter 3.

Several conservative Protestant denominations sing only the Psalms (some churches also sing the small number of hymns found elsewhere in the Bible) in worship and do not accept the use of non-Biblical hymns; examples are the Reformed Presbyterian Church of North America, the Presbyterian Reformed Church (North America), and the Free Church of Scotland (Continuing).

- Psalm 22 is of particular importance during the season of Lent as a Psalm of continued faith during severe testing.
- Psalm 23, The LORD is My Shepherd, offers an immediately appealing message of comfort and is widely chosen for church funeral services, either as a reading or in one of several popular hymn settings;
- Psalm 51, Have mercy on me O God, called the Miserere from the first word in its Latin version, in both Divine Liturgy and Hours, in the sacrament of repentance or confession, and in other settings;
- Psalm 82 is found in the Book of Common Prayer as a funeral recitation.
- Psalm 137, By the rivers of Babylon, there we sat down and wept, the Eastern Orthodox Church uses this hymn during the weeks preceding Great Lent.
- Psalm 145 by title 'A psalm of praise", is an acrostic of praise and David's final Psalm. Verses from it are frequently used in contemporary worship songs and read by contemporary worship leaders in services.

New translations and settings of the Psalms continue to be produced. An individually printed volume of Psalms for use in Christian religious rituals is called a Psalter.

Imam-ud-Din Shahbaz (1845–1921), a Punjabi evangelist and a poet, produced the first metrical translation of the Psalms in Punjabi, known as Punjabi Zabur. For a hundred years, the Punjabi Zabur has been used as an essential part of singing and praising in the majority of Urdu and Punjabi Churches around the globe.

Furthermore, psalms often serve as the inspiration for much of modern or contemporary Christian worship music in a variety of styles. Some songs are entirely based on a particular psalm or psalms, and many quote directly from the Book of Psalms (and other parts of the Bible).

==== Eastern Orthodox Christianity ====
Orthodox Christians and Greek-Catholics (Eastern Catholics who follow the Byzantine rite) have long made the Psalms an integral part of their corporate and private prayers. The official version of the Psalter used by the Orthodox Church is the Septuagint. To facilitate its reading, the 150 Psalms are divided into 20 kathismata (Greek: καθίσματα; Slavonic: кафизмы, kafizmy; lit. "sittings") and each kathisma (Greek: κάθισμα; Slavonic: каѳисма, kafisma) is further subdivided into three stases (Greek: στάσεις, staseis lit. "standings", sing. στάσις, stasis), so-called because the faithful stand at the end of each stasis for the Glory to the Father ....

At Vespers and Matins, different kathismata are read at different times of the liturgical year and on different days of the week, according to the Church's calendar, so that all 150 psalms (20 kathismata) are read in the course of a week. During Great Lent, the number of kathismata is increased so that the entire Psalter is read twice a week. In the twentieth century, some lay Christians have adopted a continuous reading of the Psalms on weekdays, praying the whole book in four weeks.

Aside from kathisma readings, Psalms occupy a prominent place in every other Orthodox service, including the services of the Hours and the Divine Liturgy. In particular, the penitential Psalm 50 is widely used. Fragments of Psalms and individual verses are used as Prokimena (introductions to Scriptural readings) and Stichera. The bulk of Vespers would still be composed of Psalms even if the kathisma were to be disregarded; Psalm 118, "The Psalm of the Law", is the centerpiece of Matins on Saturdays, some Sundays, and the Funeral service. The entire book of Psalms is traditionally read aloud or chanted at the side of the deceased during the time leading up to the funeral, mirroring Jewish tradition.

==== Oriental Christianity ====
Several branches of Oriental Orthodox and those Eastern Catholics who follow one of the Oriental Rites will chant the entire Psalter during the course of a day during the Daily Office. This practice continues to be a requirement of monastics in the Oriental churches.

==== Catholic usage ====
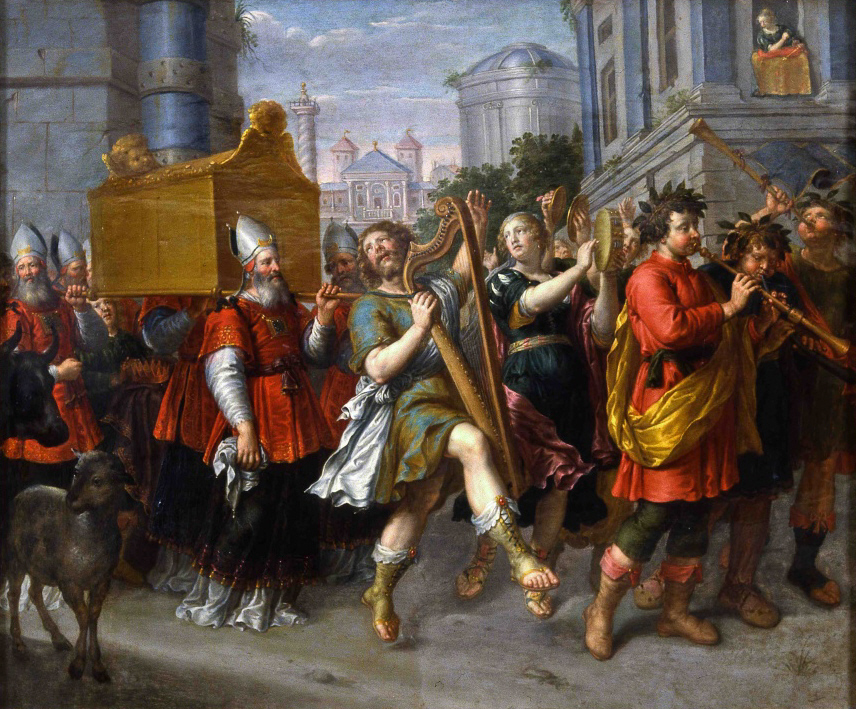
A singing and dancing David leads the Ark of the Covenant, c. 1650.

The Psalms have always been important in Catholic liturgy. The Liturgy of the Hours is centered on chanting or recitation of the Psalms, using fixed melodic formulas known as psalm tones. Early Catholics employed the Psalms widely in their individual prayers; however, as knowledge of Latin (the language of the Roman Rite) became uncommon, this practice ceased among the unlearned. However, until the end of the Middle Ages, it was not unknown for the laity to join in the singing of the Little Office of Our Lady, which was a shortened version of the Liturgy of the Hours providing a fixed daily cycle of twenty-five psalms to be recited, and nine other psalms divided across Matins.

The work of Bishop Richard Challoner in providing devotional materials in English meant that many of the psalms were familiar to English-speaking Catholics from the eighteenth century onwards. Challoner translated the entirety of the Little Office into English, Sunday Vespers, and daily Compline. He also provided other individual Psalms, such as 129/130, for prayer in his devotional books. Bishop Challoner is also noted for revising the Douay–Rheims Bible, and the translations he used in his devotional books are taken from this work.

Until the Second Vatican Council, the Psalms were either recited on a one-week or, less commonly (as in the case of Ambrosian rite), two-week cycle. Different one-week schemata were employed: most secular clergy followed the Roman distribution, while regular clergy almost universally followed that of St Benedict, with only a few congregations (such as the Benedictines of St Maur) following individual arrangements. The Breviary introduced in 1974 distributed the psalms over a four-week cycle. Monastic usage varies widely. Some use the four-week cycle of the secular clergy, many retain a one-week cycle, either following St Benedict's scheme or another of their own devising, while others opt for some other arrangement.

Official approval was also given to other arrangements (Note: See "Short" Breviaries in the 20th and early 21st century America for an in-progress study) by which the complete Psalter is recited in a one-week or two-week cycle. These arrangements are used principally by Catholic contemplative religious orders, such as that of the Trappists. (Note: See for example the Divine Office schedule at New Melleray Abbey)

The General Instruction of the Liturgy of the Hours 122 sanctions three modes of singing/recitation for the Psalms:

- directly (all sing or recite the entire psalm);
- antiphonally (two choirs or sections of the congregation sing or recite alternate verses or strophes); and
- responsorially (the cantor or choir sings or recites the verses while the congregation sings or recites a given response after each verse).

Of these three, the antiphonal mode is the most widely followed.

Over the centuries, the use of complete Psalms in the liturgy declined. After the Second Vatican Council (which also permitted the use of vernacular languages in the liturgy), longer psalm texts were reintroduced into the Mass during the readings. The revision of the Roman Missal after the Second Vatican Council reintroduced the singing or recitation of a more substantial section of a Psalm, in some cases an entire Psalm, after the first Reading from Scripture. This Psalm, called the Responsorial Psalm, is usually sung or recited responsorially, although the General Instruction of the Roman Missal 61 permits direct recitation.

==== Lutheran usage ====
In the Mass of the Lutheran Churches, the Psalms are sung according to the lectionary. It typically follows the lection from the Old Testament in the Order of Mass.

The Divine Office is centered on chanting or recitation of the Psalms, using fixed melodic formulas known as psalm tones. These are prayed in Lutheran monasteries and convents, as well as by secular Lutheran priests and deacons, in addition to a number of Lutheran laypersons.

Martin Luther's "Ein feste Burg ist unser Gott" ("A Mighty Fortress Is Our God") is based on Psalm 46.

==== Reformed usage ====
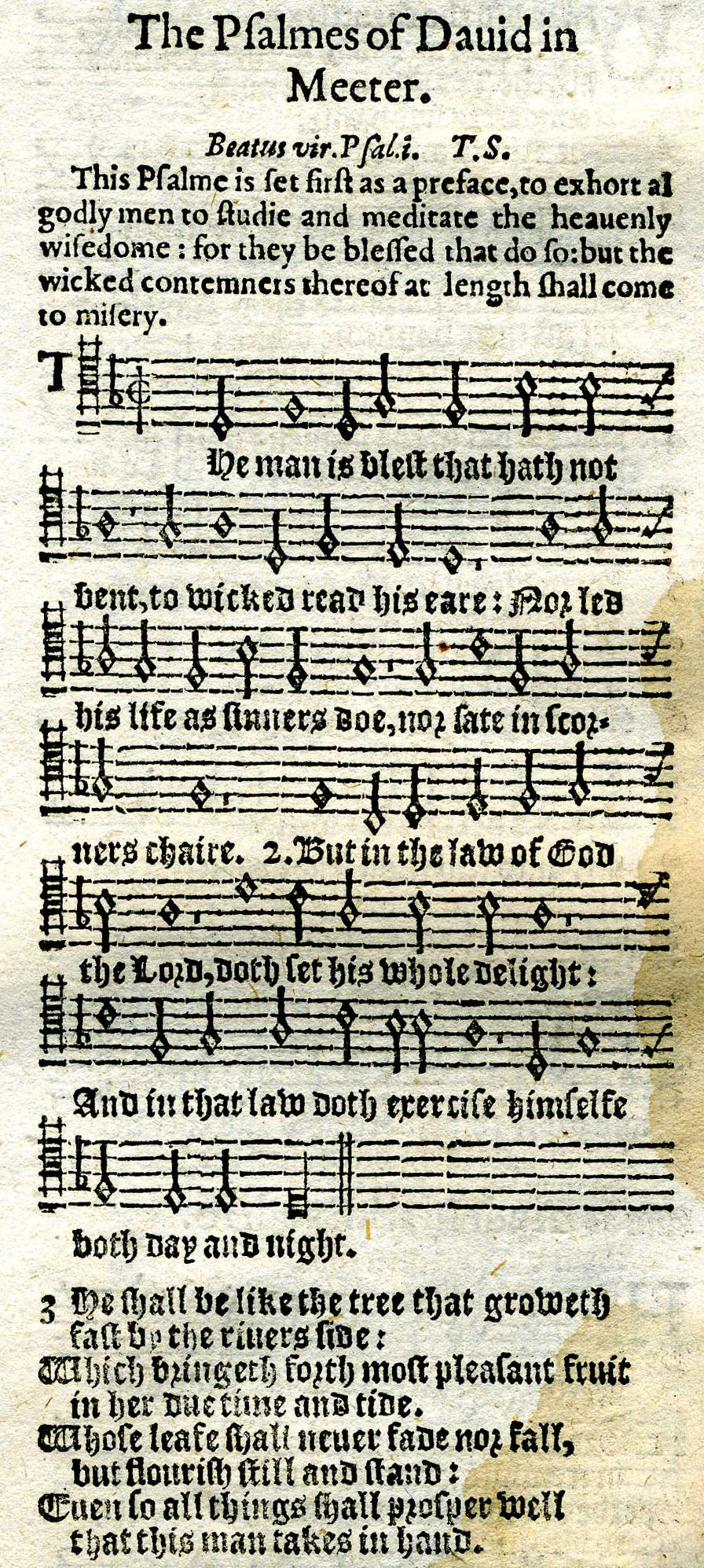
Psalm 1 in a form of the Sternhold and Hopkins version widespread in Anglican usage before the English Civil War (1628 printing). It was from this version that the armies sang before going into battle.

Following the Protestant Reformation, many of the Psalms were set as hymns. These vernacular translations of the psalms were arranged into rhyming strict-metre verses, known as metrical psalms and used for congregational singing. The metrical psalms were particularly popular in the Calvinist tradition, where in the past they were often sung to the exclusion of other hymns (exclusive psalmody). John Calvin himself made some French translations of the Psalms for church usage, but the completed Genevan Psalter eventually used in church services consisted exclusively of translations by Clément Marot and Théodore de Bèze, on melodies by a number of composers, including Louis Bourgeois and a certain Maistre Pierre. Among famous hymn settings of the Psalter were the Scottish Psalter and the paraphrases by Isaac Watts. The first book printed in North America was a collection of Psalm settings, the Bay Psalm Book (1640).

Metrical psalms are still widely sung in many Reformed congregations. Additionally, the Psalms are popular for private devotion among the Reformed.

There exists in some circles a custom of reading one Psalm and one chapter of Proverbs a day, corresponding to the day of the month.

==== Anglican usage ====
Anglican chant is a method of singing prose versions of the Psalms.

In the early 17th century, when the King James Bible was introduced, the metrical arrangements by Thomas Sternhold and John Hopkins were also popular and were provided with printed tunes. This version and the New Version of the Psalms of David by Tate and Brady produced in the late seventeenth century (see article on Metrical psalter) remained the normal congregational way of singing psalms in the Church of England until well into the nineteenth century.

In Great Britain, the 16th-century Coverdale psalter still forms the heart of daily worship in Cathedral and many parish churches. The new Common Worship service book has a companion psalter in modern English.

The version of the psalter in the American Book of Common Prayer prior to the 1979 edition is the Coverdale psalter. The Psalter in the American Book of Common Prayer of 1979 is a new translation, with some attempt to keep the rhythms of the Coverdale Psalter.

=== Islam ===
According to the Islamic holy book, the Qur'an, God has sent many messengers to humanity. Five universally acknowledged messengers (rasul) are Abraham, Moses, David, Jesus and Muhammad, each believed to have been sent with a scripture. Muslims believe David (Dāwūd) received Psalms (Zabur) (cf. Q38:28); Jesus (Īsā) the Gospel (Injeel); Muhammad received the Qur'an; and Abraham (Ibrahim) the Scrolls of Abraham; meanwhile, the Tawrat is the Arabic name for the Torah within its context as an Islamic holy book believed by Muslims to have been given by God to the prophets and messengers amongst the Children of Israel, and often refers to the entire Hebrew Bible. God is considered to have authored the Psalms.

=== Use in the Rastafari movement ===
The Psalms are one of the most popular parts of the Bible among followers of the Rastafari movement. Rasta singer Prince Far I released an atmospheric spoken version of the psalms, Psalms for I, set to a roots reggae backdrop from The Aggrovators.

== Psalms set to music ==
=== Multiple psalms as a single composition ===
Psalms have often been set as part of a larger work. The psalms feature large in settings of Vespers, including those by Claudio Monteverdi, Antonio Vivaldi, Marc-Antoine Charpentier (84 settings H.149 – H.232) and Wolfgang Amadeus Mozart, who wrote such settings as part of their responsibilities as church musicians. Psalms are inserted in Requiem compositions, such as Psalm 126 in A German Requiem of Johannes Brahms and Psalms 130 and 23 in John Rutter's Requiem.

- Melodie na psałterz polski by Mikołaj Gomółka – 1580
- Psalmi Davidis poenitentiales (6, 32, 38, 51, 102, 130, 143) by Orlando di Lasso – 1584
- Psalmen Davids (1619), Symphoniae sacrae I (1629) and Becker Psalter (1661) by Heinrich Schütz
- Chandos Anthems by George Frideric Handel – 1717–18
- Zwei englisch Psalmen (1842), Sieben Psalmen nach Lobwasser (1843), Elijah (1846), and Drei Psalmen (1849) by Felix Mendelssohn
- Eighteen Liturgical Psalms by Louis Lewandowski – 1879
- Biblické písně by Antonín Dvořák – 1894
- Le Roi David by Arthur Honegger – 1921
- Symphony of Psalms (38, 39, 150) by Igor Stravinsky – 1930
- Chichester Psalms by Leonard Bernstein – 1965
- Tehillim by Steve Reich – 1981
- Four Psalms (114, 126, 133, 137) by John Harbison – 1998

=== Individual psalm settings ===
There are many settings of individual psalms. One of the better known examples is Gregorio Allegri's Miserere mei, a falsobordone setting of Psalm 51 ("Have mercy upon me, O God"). Settings of individual psalms by later composers are also frequent: they include works from composers such as George Frideric Handel, Felix Mendelssohn, Franz Liszt, Johannes Brahms and Ralph Vaughan Williams. Psalms also feature in more modern musical movements and popular genres.

== See also ==
- Exclusive psalmody
- History of music in the biblical period
- Penitential Psalms
- Psalm of communal lament
- Selah
- Zabur
- Genevan Psalter
- Pesher

== Bibliography ==
- Alter, Robert (2007). The Book of Psalms. W. W. Norton. ISBN 978-0-393-06226-7.
- Berlin, Adele; Brettler, Marc Zvi (2004). "Psalms". In Berlin, Adele; Brettler, Marc Zvi; Fishbane, Michael A. (eds.). The Jewish Study Bible. Oxford University Press. ISBN 978-0-19-529751-5.
- Bray, G. (1996). Biblical Interpretation: Past and Present. Intervarsity Press.
- Bullock, C. Hassell (2004). Encountering the Book of Psalms: A Literary and Theological Introduction. Baker Academic. ISBN 978-0-8010-2795-6.
- Clifford, Richard J. (2010). "Psalms". In Coogan, Michael David; Brettler, Marc Zvi; Newsom, Carol Ann (eds.). The New Oxford Annotated Bible: New Revised Standard Version: with the Apocrypha: an Ecumenical Study Bible. Oxford University Press. ISBN 978-0-19-528955-8.
- Cosgrove, Charles H. (2025). A History of Christian Psalmody: From the Pauline Mission to the End of the Fifth Century. Fortress Press. p. 423. ISBN 9798889836797.
- Day, John (2003). Psalms. Continuum. ISBN 978-0-567-08454-5.
- Harris, Stephen L. (1985). Understanding the Bible. Mayfield.
- Hayes, John H. (1998). "The Songs of Israel". In McKenzie, Steven L.; Graham, Matt Patrick (eds.). The Hebrew Bible Today: An Introduction to Critical Issues. Westminster John Knox Press. ISBN 978-0-664-25652-4.
- Kselman, John S. (2007). "Psalms". In Coogan, Michael David; Brettler, Marc Zvi; Newsom, Carol Ann (eds.). The New Oxford Annotated Bible with the Apocryphal/Deuterocanonical Books. Oxford University Press. ISBN 978-0-19-528880-3.
- Mazor, Lea (2011). "Book of Psalms". In Berlin, Adele; Grossman, Maxine (eds.). The Oxford Dictionary of the Jewish Religion. Oxford University Press. ISBN 978-0-19-973004-9.
- Mitchell, David C. (1997). The Message of the Psalter: An Eschatological Programme in the Book of Psalms. JSOT: Sheffield Academic Press. ISBN 978-1-85075-689-7.
- Mitchell, David C. (2015). The Songs of Ascents: Psalms 120 to 134 in the Worship of Jerusalem's Temples. Campbell: Newton Mearns.
- Murphy, Roland E. (1993). "Psalms". In Coogan, Michael D.; Metzger, Bruce (eds.). The Oxford Companion to the Bible. Oxford University Press. ISBN 978-0-19-974391-9.
- Prinsloo, Willem S. (2003). "Psalms". In Dunn, James D. G.; Rogerson, John William (eds.). Eerdmans Commentary on the Bible. Eerdmans. ISBN 978-0-8028-3711-0.
- Saadia Gaon (2010). Qafih, Yosef (ed.). תהלים עם תרגום ופירוש הגאון רבינו סעדיה בן יוסף פיומי זצ"ל [Book of Psalms, with a Translation and Commentary made by Rabbi Saadia Gaon] (in Hebrew). Kiryat-Ono: Makhon Moshe (Makhon Mishnat haRambam). OCLC 741156698.
- Simon, Uriel [in Hebrew] (1982). ארבע גישות לספר תהלים: מר׳ סעדיה גאון עד ר׳ אברהם אבן עזרא: כולל שריד מ׳שיטה ראשונה׳ של פירוש ראב״ע לתהלים שעדיין לא ראתה אור [Four Approaches to the Book of Psalms: from Saadiah Gaon to Abraham Ibn Ezra] (in Hebrew). Ramat Gan: Bar-Ilan University. ISBN 978-965-226-031-4. OCLC 10751226.
- Theodore, Antony (2021). Psalms of Love. Kohinoor Books. ISBN 978-81-952546-1-3.
- Zenner, Johannes Konrad (1896). Die Chorgesänge im Buche der Psalmen: ihre Existenz und ihre Form nachgewiesen. Herder.

Psalms Wisdom literature
Preceded by The Twelve Prophets	Hebrew Bible	Succeeded by Proverbs
Preceded by Job	Western; Old Testament	Succeeded by Proverbs
Preceded by Job	E. Orthodox; Old Testament	Succeeded by Odes
