= Imprecatory Psalms =

Old testament Psalms that invoke judgment upon enemies

Imprecatory Psalms are hymns that pray for enemies of God to suffer harm. Imprecations are found throughout the Bible. Within the Book of Psalms, several passages call for judgment, calamity, or curses upon various foes. Such prayers are not unique to Judaism or Christianity.

== Content ==
In societies with a largely oral culture, the spoken word had outsized impact. Words could affect reality and perception simply through their utterance. The Old Testament abounds with instances where spoken curses or blessings trigger major events, such as Jacob's deception of Isaac (Genesis 27) and David unwittingly sentencing his own son to death (2 Samuel 12). Such words are emanations of the human spirit, and their efficacy is a direct result of the power of the speaker's soul.

The story of Balaam in Numbers 23 exemplifies the thin line between a blessing and a curse. After Balak asks the prophet to curse the Israelites, he fears the words could be converted into a blessing and instead urges Balaam to remain silent.

Imprecatory Psalms are hymns which include some kind of call to judgment, calamity, or curse to befall a foe. The term can be misleading because a Psalm with just one verse of imprecation is often classified as imprecatory. Even a generally beatific text like Psalm 23 ("The Lord Is My Shepherd") can quickly veer into an imprecation before returning to its primary subject.

The Bible has 150 Psalms, and six are generally considered imprecatory: 55, 59, 69, 79, 109, and 137.

Psalm 69 features the plea to God, "Pour out Your indignation on them, and let Your burning anger overtake them." (Ps 69:24)

There was a tradition in Europe of praying an enemy to death with Psalm 109. John Calvin wrote about a wealthy woman who employed Franciscans to kill her son with it.

Psalm 137's grisly imagery of bashing infants to death on rocks was allegorized in the Rule of Saint Benedict as wicked thoughts that must be bashed against the rock of Christ.

Psalms 5, 6, 10, 12, 35, 37, 40, 52, 54, 56, 57, 58, 83, 94, 139 and 143 are also considered imprecatory.

The Psalms (Tehilim, תהילים, or "praises") are part of both Hebrew and Christian Scripture. They formed ancient Israel's psalter or hymnbook, which was used during temple and private worship. The Psalms are also important references for Jesus throughout the New Testament. He quotes them in John 2:17 and John 15:25, and Paul the Apostle quotes Psalm 69 in his Epistle to the Romans 11:9-10 and 15:3.

== Interpretation ==
Imprecatory Psalms are some of the most theologically puzzling passages of the Old Testament. One explanation for their presence in the Bible is that it contains many things that are displeasing to God, such as Satan's words in Job or the wicked deeds of David, Solomon, and Judas. The imprecations have also been variously explained as allegorical, cathartic, products of their time, quotations of enemies, spells, prophecies, the words of the Messiah, or expressions of dependence.

In 1862, Edwards Amasa Park wrote, "Many an amiable Christian reads some of these scriptures with a half-closed eye. The Imprecatory Psalms...are thought to be ill suited for modern times."

After witnessing the Nazi persecution of Martin Niemöller in 1937, Dietrich Bonhoeffer wrote a sermon on Psalm 58. The Psalm concludes with a grisly image, "The righteous...will bathe their feet in the blood of the wicked". Bonhoeffer begins, "...May we pray this way? Certainly not!" He argues that only the innocent can pray in this way, and the only true innocent is Jesus.

C.S. Lewis described the imprecatory trap, "The hatred is there-festering, gloating, undisguised...we should be wicked if we in any way condoned or approved it, or (worse still) used it to justify similar passions in ourselves." Lewis worried the imprecations encourage a man "to add, explicitly or implicitly, 'Thus saith the Lord' to the expression of his own emotions or even his own opinions; as Carlyle and Kipling and some politicians, and even, in their own way, some modern critics, so horribly do."

The Second Vatican Council removed some imprecatory psalms from the Liturgy of the Hours in the Catholic Church. The psalms were also edited for continued use in the Mass.

== Other imprecations ==
=== Old Testament ===
Curses in the Hebrew Bible are not limited to the Imprecatory Psalms. One of the first occurrences is in Genesis 9:25 when Noah curses his grandson Canaan. The Nevi'im contain many imprecations in Hosea, Micah, and Jeremiah. Alongside this, in the Third Sermon of Moses in the book of Deuteronomy of the Torah, Moses is shown describing a litany of curses that would befall Israel for rebelliousness. Many of the same curses were later warned about by Joshua, some 100 years after Moses's death.

In Jeremiah 17:14–18, the prophet's prayer for healing winds up to the imprecation, "Let them be confounded that persecute me, but let not me be confounded: let them be dismayed, but let not me be dismayed: bring upon them the day of evil, and destroy them with double destruction." This language mirrors the imprecatory psalms. A similar passage occurs earlier when Jeremiah asks God to "revenge me of my persecutors" (15:10). Jeremiah 34:18–20 turns the ritual sacrifices which mark a covenant into a warning of what will befall anyone who breaks the agreement, "And I will give the men that have transgressed my covenant...when they cut the calf in twain, and passed between the parts thereof...I will even give them into the hand of their enemies, and into the hand of them that seek their life: and their dead bodies shall be for meat unto the fowls of the heaven, and to the beasts of the earth."

=== New Testament ===
The Old Testament is not alone in containing imprecations:

- Matthew 23:13 — "But woe unto you, scribes and Pharisees, hypocrites! for ye shut up the kingdom of heaven against men: for ye neither go in yourselves, neither suffer ye them that are entering to go in."
- Matthew 26:23–24 — "And he answered and said, He that dippeth his hand with me in the dish, the same shall betray me. The Son of man goeth as it is written of him: but woe unto that man by whom the Son of man is betrayed! it had been good for that man if he had not been born."
- 1 Corinthians 16:22 — "If any man love not the Lord Jesus Christ, let him be Anathema Maranatha."
- Galatians 1:8–9 — "But though we, or an angel from heaven, preach any other gospel unto you than that which we have preached unto you, let him be accursed. As we said before, so say I now again, If any man preach any other gospel unto you than that ye have received, let him be accursed."
- Galatians 5:12 — "I would they were even cut off which trouble you."
- 2 Timothy 4:14 —"Alexander the coppersmith did me much evil: the Lord reward him according to his works:"
- Revelation 6:10 — "And they cried with a loud voice, saying, How long, O Lord, holy and true, dost thou not judge and avenge our blood on them that dwell on the earth?"

== See also ==
- Curse
- Jeremiad
