= Psalm 75 =

Biblical psalm

- "Unto thee, O God, do we give thanks"
- Psalms of Asaph
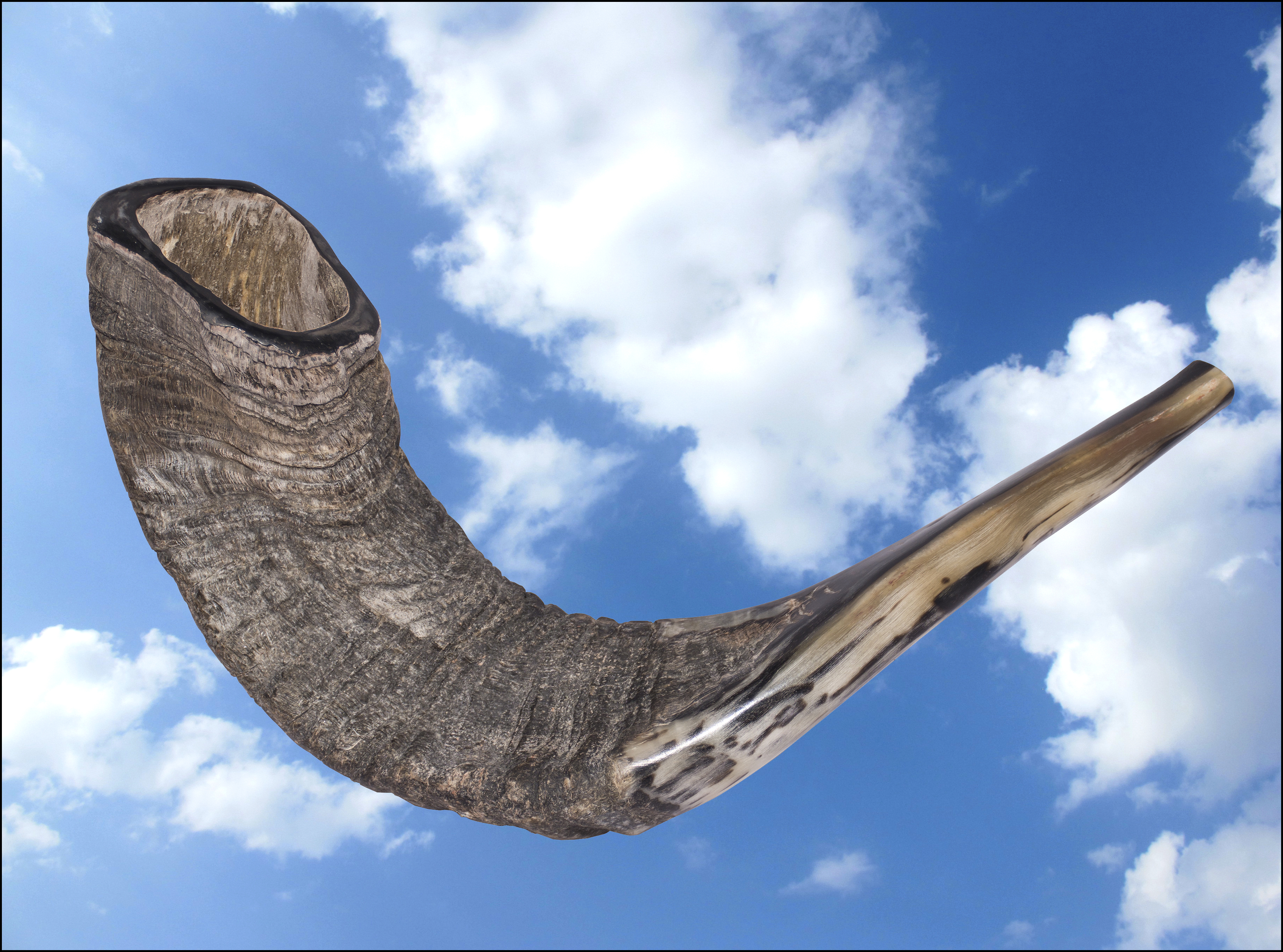
- Shofar
- Other name: Psalm 74 (Vulgate); "Confitebimur tibi Deus"
- Language: Hebrew (original)

Psalm 75
- ← Psalm 74 Psalm 76 →
- Book: Book of Psalms
- Hebrew Bible part: Ketuvim
- Order in the Hebrew part: 1
- Category: Sifrei Emet
- Christian Bible part: Old Testament
- Order in the Christian part: 19

Psalm 75 is the 75th psalm of the Book of Psalms, beginning in English in the King James Version: "Unto thee, O God, do we give thanks". The Book of Psalms forms part of the Ketuvim section of the Hebrew Bible and part of the Christian Old Testament. In the slightly different numbering system of the Greek Septuagint version of the bible, and in its Latin translation, the Vulgate, this psalm is Psalm 74. In Latin, it is known as "Confitebimur tibi Deus". It is one of the psalms of Asaph.

This psalm forms a regular part of Jewish, Catholic, Lutheran, Anglican and other Protestant liturgies. The thought of giving thanks has often been set to music, including in works by Heinrich Schütz and Johann Sebastian Bach.

== Background and themes ==
Attributed to Asaph, Psalm 75 continues the theme of Psalms 57, 58, and 59, which also begin with the words al tashcheth, "Do not destroy". The New King James Version refers to al tashcheth or "Do not destroy" as a musical setting. Like the previous psalms, Psalm 75 speaks of the Jews in exile, and praises God for preserving them.

The psalm references the word "horn" several times. According to Charles Spurgeon, the horn is a symbol of honor or strength, but when possessed by the arrogant, the horn is said to be "cut down" or humbled. While God rejects the horns of the haughty, he exalts the horns of the righteous.

The Midrash Tehillim cites ten scriptural verses that mention horns to identify ten horns that God gave to the Israelites: the horns of Abraham, Isaac (the shofar or ram's horn), Moses, Samuel, Aaron, the Sanhedrin, Heman the Ezrahite, Jerusalem, the Jewish Messiah, and David in the future. When the Israelites sinned, these ten horns were removed from them and transferred to the wicked, as it is written, "Behold a fourth beast, dreadful and terrible, and it had ten horns" (Daniel 7:7). The Midrash teaches that as long as the horns of the wicked prevail, the horns of Israel will be cut off; but in future, when God elevates the horns of the righteous, the horns of the wicked will be cut off.

== Uses ==
=== Judaism ===
Psalm 75 is recited during the Motza'ei Shabbat prayers in the Sephardic tradition. In the Siddur Avodas Yisrael, Psalm 75 is said as the Song of the Day for Shabbat Torah reading Ki Tissa and Eikev. This psalm is also recited on the third through sixth days of Passover in some traditions.

Psalm 75 is recited as a "prayer for forgiveness".

=== Book of Common Prayer ===
In the Church of England's Book of Common Prayer, this psalm is appointed to be read on the morning of the 15th day of the month.

== Musical settings ==
Beginning of Bach's Gratias agimus tibi of the Mass in B minor

Baroque composer Heinrich Schütz set Psalm 75 in German, "Aus unsers Herzen Grunde", for choir as part of his composition of the Becker Psalter, SWV 172. Johann Sebastian Bach used the beginning of Psalm 75 for the opening movement of Wir danken dir, Gott, wir danken dir, BWV 29, a cantata for the inauguration of a town council in Leipzig. He used the music again for the movement Gratias agimus tibi of the Mass in B minor, expressing the same thought of thanks.

Hymns based on Psalm 75 or specific verses include the popular "Now Thank We All Our God", Catherine Winkworth's translation of Rinkart's "Nun danket alle Gott". The German hymn and its English version inspired several settings, including some by Bach.

== Text ==
The following table shows the Hebrew text of the Psalm with vowels, alongside the Koine Greek text in the Septuagint and the English translation from the King James Version. Note that the meaning can slightly differ between these versions, as the Septuagint and the Masoretic Text come from different textual traditions. (Note: A 1917 translation directly from Hebrew to English by the Jewish Publication Society can be found here or here, and an 1844 translation directly from the Septuagint by L. C. L. Brenton can be found here. Both translations are in the public domain.) In the Septuagint, this psalm is numbered Psalm 74.

#	Hebrew	English	Greek
(Note: In the Jewish verse numbering, the ascription of this psalm is verse 1, and the rest of the psalm begins from verse 2. However, the Christian verse numbering does not count the ascription.)	לַמְנַצֵּ֥חַ אַל־תַּשְׁחֵ֑ת מִזְמ֖וֹר לְאָסָ֣ף שִֽׁיר׃	(To the chief Musician, Altaschith, A Psalm or Song of Asaph.)	Εἰς τὸ τέλος· μὴ διαφθείρῃς· ψαλμὸς ᾠδῆς τῷ ᾿Ασάφ. -
1	ה֘וֹדִ֤ינוּ לְּךָ֨ ׀ אֱֽלֹהִ֗ים ה֭וֹדִינוּ וְקָר֣וֹב שְׁמֶ֑ךָ סִ֝פְּר֗וּ נִפְלְאוֹתֶֽיךָ׃	Unto thee, O God, do we give thanks, unto thee do we give thanks: for that thy name is near thy wondrous works declare.	ΕΞΟΜΟΛΟΓΗΣΟΜΕΘΑ σοι, ὁ Θεός, ἐξομολογησόμεθά σοι καὶ ἐπικαλεσόμεθα τὸ ὄνομά σου.
2	כִּ֭י אֶקַּ֣ח מוֹעֵ֑ד אֲ֝נִ֗י מֵישָׁרִ֥ים אֶשְׁפֹּֽט׃	When I shall receive the congregation I will judge uprightly.	διηγήσομαι πάντα τὰ θαυμάσιά σου, ὅταν λάβω καιρόν· ἐγὼ εὐθύτητας κρινῶ.
3	נְֽמֹגִ֗ים אֶ֥רֶץ וְכׇל־יֹשְׁבֶ֑יהָ אָנֹכִ֨י תִכַּ֖נְתִּי עַמּוּדֶ֣יהָ סֶּֽלָה׃	The earth and all the inhabitants thereof are dissolved: I bear up the pillars of it. Selah.	ἐτάκη ἡ γῆ καὶ πάντες οἱ κατοικοῦντες ἐν αὐτῇ, ἐγὼ ἐστερέωσα τοὺς στύλους αὐτῆς. (διάψαλμα).
4	אָמַ֣רְתִּי לַ֭הוֹלְלִים אַל־תָּהֹ֑לּוּ וְ֝לָרְשָׁעִ֗ים אַל־תָּרִ֥ימוּ קָֽרֶן׃	I said unto the fools, Deal not foolishly: and to the wicked, Lift not up the horn:	εἶπα τοῖς παρανομοῦσι· μὴ παρανομεῖτε, καὶ τοῖς ἁμαρτάνουσι· μὴ ὑψοῦτε κέρας,
5	אַל־תָּרִ֣ימוּ לַמָּר֣וֹם קַרְנְכֶ֑ם תְּדַבְּר֖וּ בְצַוָּ֣אר עָתָֽק׃	Lift not up your horn on high: speak not with a stiff neck.	μὴ ἐπαίρετε εἰς ὕψος τὸ κέρας ὑμῶν καὶ μὴ λαλεῖτε κατὰ τοῦ Θεοῦ ἀδικίαν.
6	כִּ֤י לֹ֣א מִ֭מּוֹצָא וּמִֽמַּעֲרָ֑ב וְ֝לֹ֗א מִמִּדְבַּ֥ר הָרִֽים׃	For promotion cometh neither from the east, nor from the west, nor from the south.	ὅτι οὔτε ἐξ ἐξόδων οὔτε ἀπὸ δυσμῶν οὔτε ἀπὸ ἐρήμων ὀρέων,
7	כִּֽי־אֱלֹהִ֥ים שֹׁפֵ֑ט זֶ֥ה יַ֝שְׁפִּ֗יל וְזֶ֣ה יָרִֽים׃	But God is the judge: he putteth down one, and setteth up another.	ὅτι ὁ Θεὸς κριτής ἐστι, τοῦτον ταπεινοῖ καὶ τοῦτον ὑψοῖ.
8	כִּ֤י כ֪וֹס בְּֽיַד־יְהֹוָ֡ה וְיַ֤יִן חָמַ֨ר ׀ מָ֥לֵא מֶסֶךְ֮ וַיַּגֵּ֢ר מִ֫זֶּ֥ה אַךְ־שְׁ֭מָרֶיהָ יִמְצ֣וּ יִשְׁתּ֑וּ כֹּ֝֗ל רִשְׁעֵי־אָֽרֶץ׃	For in the hand of the LORD there is a cup, and the wine is red; it is full of mixture; and he poureth out of the same: but the dregs thereof, all the wicked of the earth shall wring them out, and drink them.	ὅτι ποτήριον ἐν χειρὶ Κυρίου οἴνου ἀκράτου πλῆρες κεράσματος. καὶ ἔκλινεν ἐκ τούτου εἰς τοῦτο, πλὴν ὁ τρυγίας αὐτοῦ οὐκ ἐξεκενώθη, πίονται πάντες οἱ ἁμαρτωλοὶ τῆς γῆς·
9	וַ֭אֲנִי אַגִּ֣יד לְעֹלָ֑ם אֲ֝זַמְּרָ֗ה לֵאלֹהֵ֥י יַעֲקֹֽב׃	But I will declare for ever; I will sing praises to the God of Jacob.	ἐγὼ δὲ ἀγαλλιάσομαι εἰς τὸν αἰῶνα, ψαλῶ τῷ Θεῷ ᾿Ιακώβ·
10	וְכׇל־קַרְנֵ֣י רְשָׁעִ֣ים אֲגַדֵּ֑עַ תְּ֝רוֹמַ֗מְנָה קַֽרְנ֥וֹת צַדִּֽיק׃	All the horns of the wicked also will I cut off; but the horns of the righteous shall be exalted.	καὶ πάντα τὰ κέρατα τῶν ἁμαρτωλῶν συνθλάσω, καὶ ὑψωθήσεται τὰ κέρατα τοῦ δικαίου.

=== Verse 2 ===
When I shall receive the congregation I will judge uprightly.

Amended to "the proper time" or "the appointed time" in the New International Version and New King James Version. The "appointed time" is "the proper moment foreordained in the Divine counsels and known to God".

== Sources ==
- Nulman, Macy (1996). The Encyclopedia of Jewish Prayer: The Ashkenazic and Sephardic Rites. Jason Aronson. ISBN 1461631246.
- Tehillim (2nd ed.). Mesorah Publications Ltd. 1985. p. 1747. ISBN 9780899060620.
