= Novgorod Codex =

c. 1000 CE Rus' palimpsest in Slavonic

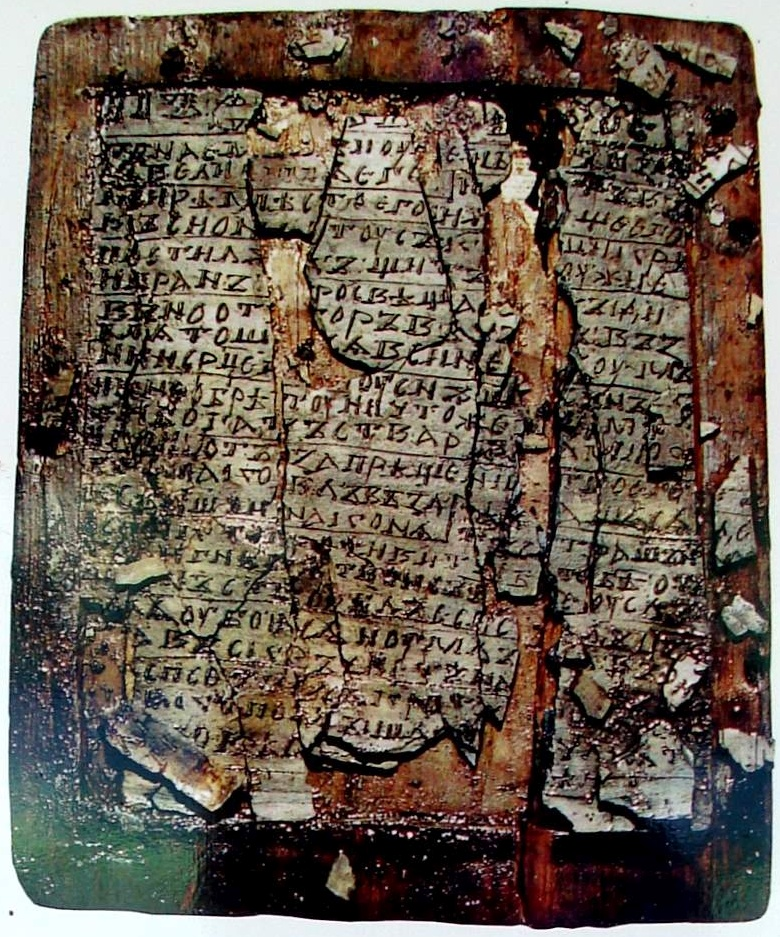
First page of the Codex at the time of discovery

The Novgorod Codex (Russian: Новгородский кодекс, romanized: Novgorodskij kodeks) or the Novgorod Psalter (Новгородская псалтирь, Novgorodskaja psaltir') is the oldest-known book of the Kievan Rus', unearthed on 13 July 2000 in Veliky Novgorod, Russia. It is a palimpsest consisting of three bound wooden tablets containing four pages filled with wax, on which its former owner wrote down dozens, probably hundreds of texts during two or three decades, each time wiping out the preceding text.

According to data obtained by stratigraphy, dendrochronology, carbon dating, and from the text itself (where the year 999 occurs several times), the codex has been dated to the first quarter of the 11th century CE, and possibly the last years of the 10th century. It is therefore older than the Ostromir Gospels, the earliest precisely-dated Kievan Rus' book.

== Discovery and description ==
An example of excavated Novgorod boardwalk, built c. 1120

Since 1932, remnants of the medieval Russian city of Veliky Novgorod have been continuously excavated by the Novgorod Archaeological Expedition started by Artemiy Artsikhovsky. Since the early 1970s, the excavations have focused on the Troitza ('Trinity') area of the ancient Ludin part of town, covering nearly 6,000 square meters (64,500 square feet). The area excavated housed affluent mansions and a large 1,200-m^{2} (13,000-sq-ft) communal building, which contained a courthouse and a city treasury. The vast majority of the texts found in Novgorod are birch bark manuscripts; wax tablets are extremely uncommon.

On 13 July 2000, the expedition headed by professor Valentin Yanin discovered three wooden wax tablets in the soil. The tablets are 19 x 15 x 1 cm, and they have 15 x 11.5 cm wax-filled indentations. Two of the tablets have one wax layer and one blank wooden side, and a third tablet has two wax sides. The boards have round holes at one edge, through which wooden pegs were inserted, holding the tablets together as a four-page book.

The tablets were discovered in a stratum 50 cm away and 30 cm below a wooden walkway dendrochronologically dated to the year 1036. As the strata in Novgorod are estimated to have accumulated at about 1 cm per year, the document was estimated to have been placed there around 1015–1020. Subsequent radiocarbon dating of the wax at the Uppsala University in Sweden gave a range of 760–1030 with 95.4% certainty. Due to Christian text on the tablets, dates earlier than the Christianization of the Kievan Rus' in 988 are considered unlikely, and as such, the wax tablets are reliably dated to a 42-year window between 988 and 1030.

== Basic text ==
The wax of the codex itself contains Psalms 75 and 76 (and a small fragment of Psalm 67). This is the so-called basic text of the codex. Consequently, it is alternatively known as the Novgorod Psalter. The text can be read as easily as any document on parchment and could be immediately examined upon discovery. The psalter translation exhibits a somewhat different translatory tradition than other Old Church Slavonic translations of Psalms (especially the Psalterium Sinaiticum).

== Language ==
The language of the Novgorod Codex is a very regular (especially in the basic text) Old Church Slavonic, albeit with some errors in the rendition of the yus letters, suggesting the author's East Slavic origin. The whole text was written by the same person in a so-called monoyeric orthography (Russian: одноеровая система письма), i.e. instead of the two yer letters ь and ъ, only ъ is used. Before the codex's discovery, the monoyeric system was considered to have been a late invention, with the dualyeric system being the original. The codex's discovery proved that the reverse was the case.

== Preservation and decipherment ==
Preservation of the tablets presented unique challenges, as the usual preservation method for wood would have destroyed the wax layer, and vice versa. The method eventually decided on called for careful separation of the wax layer, and preserving each material separately. The newly-exposed wood under the removed wax was found to have been extensively scratched by the stylus cutting through the thin wax. It took the research team several weeks to realize that some characters could be discerned from the scratches.

Russian linguist and expert on the medieval Novgorod dialect, Andrey Zaliznyak, reconstructed a small portion of the texts underlying the basic text. The main difficulty with the task is that traces of tens of thousands of letters left by the stylus, often hardly discernible from the natural pattern of the soft lime wood, are superimposed on each other, producing a labyrinth of lines which Zaliznyak described as a "hyper-palimpsest". Consequently, deciphering a single concealed text on one page can take weeks.

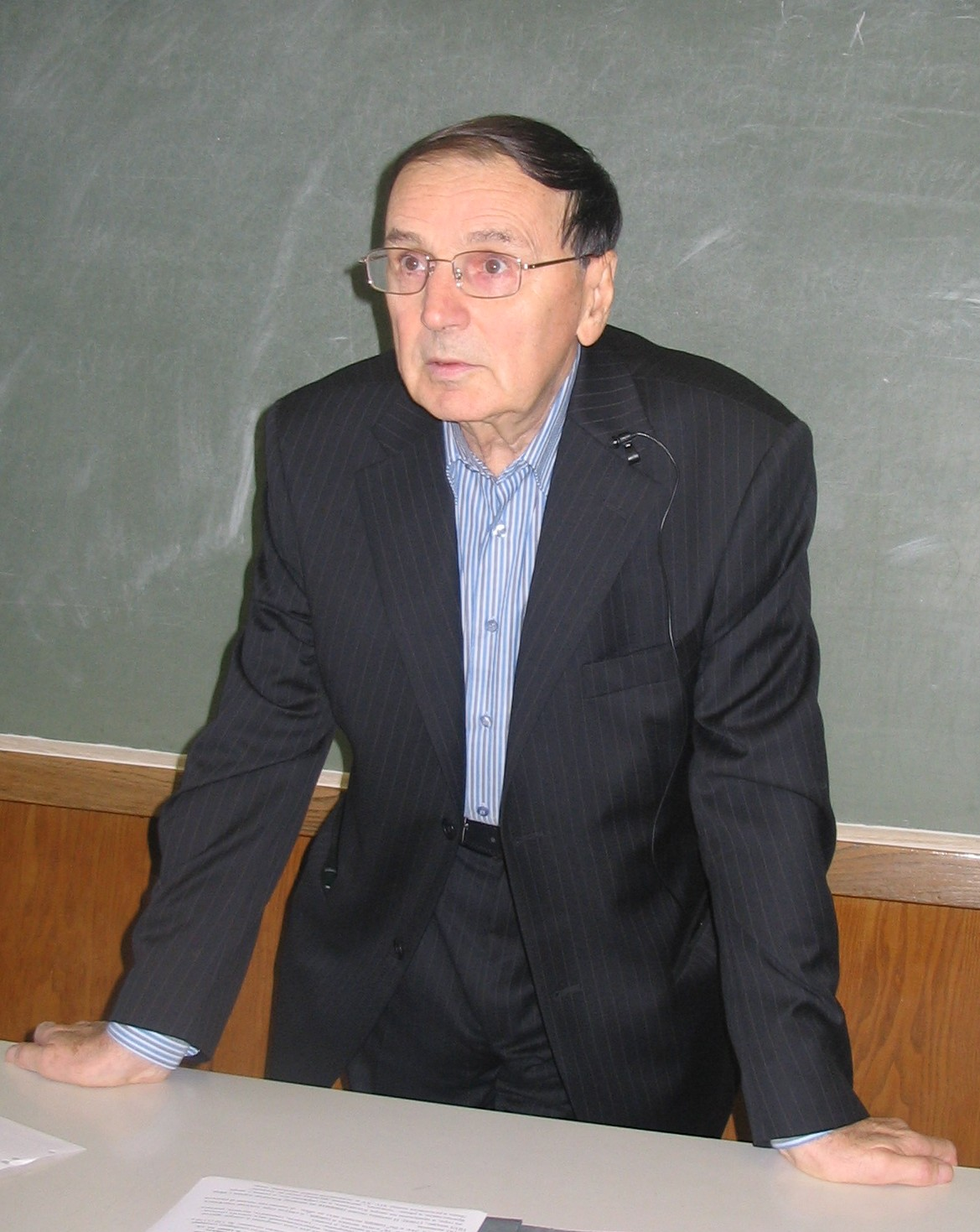
Andrey Zaliznyak

According to Zaliznyak, reading the concealed texts in the scratches is a unique challenge unlike anything attempted by any research team previously. The very compact surface of the four writing surfaces contains traces of thousands of texts, estimated to have been written over several decades. To complicate the process, they are also all written by a single person, making handwriting analysis impossible. As such, Zaliznyak did not call the process reading but instead reconstruction. Instead of asking himself "what's written on this line?", Zaliznyak approached the problem as "is a 'phrase A' or a 'word B' possible among everything written in this sector?"

Reconstruction was done by Zaliznyak letter by letter, usually starting from an arbitrary position near the top of a tablet. After analyzing the mesh of scratches and identifying some of the letters in a given spot (which can number hundreds or even thousands), he then moved to the side and began identifying letters at the next position. After several positions were discerned, most letter combinations were discarded as senseless jumble, and possibly meaningful words were identified. Zaliznyak then moved to the next position and attempted to locate subsequent letters that would complete the word or sentence. As the text has no spaces between words, as was typical at the time, identifying letter chains is somewhat easier than if the text were written with spaces. As the chains continued to grow in size, Zaliznyak's search often branched off into false leads, where at certain letters the chains could be continued by different text fragments. Sometimes the false leads were identified after a few letters, but other times they could take several words, sentences, and even longer to be discounted. Such false leads could take several days or weeks to identify.

Another aspect of the texts is that many of them were written multiple times, for unknown reasons. Due to the previous copy being erased before a new copy was made, each repetition is written somewhat shifted compared to the previous one. It is unknown whether the copies were made right after each other, or weeks or more apart. Multiple copies of the same text make identifying false chains easier.

The process is difficult to peer-review. Only small portions of Zaliznyak's reconstructions have been peer-reviewed, as no research team has come forward that is willing to learn and repeat the process over the lengthy texts. Linguist Izabel Vallotton of Geneva cooperated with Zaliznyak on some portions of the reconstruction, where Zaliznyak identified a portion of the text and passed it on to Vallotton, with both of them then continuing to independently reconstruct it. In the process, both Vallotton and Zaliznyak ended up with chains that matched to the letter, but they were short, only 20–30 characters long.

Finally, a problem Zaliznyak considered unsolvable was identifying spelling errors or Russ-isms in the Old Church Slavonic. Often, at a position where an error or deviation from Old Church Slavonic is possible, a correct letter is present alongside an erroneous one, in which case Zaliznyak assumed the original text was written as intended. In some cases, that assumption may be incorrect, such as if the author erased a mistake with his stylus and wrote the correct symbol.

== Concealed texts and author identity ==
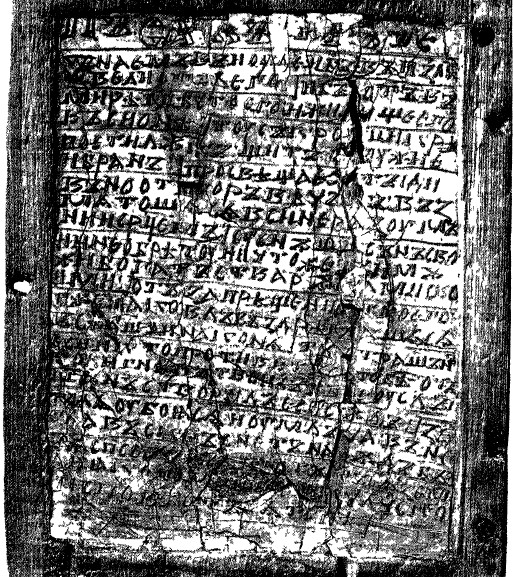
Reconstructed first page, Psalm 75

One of the first concealed texts reconstructed is an unnamed text Zaliznyak called Instruction on Forgiveness of Sins. Its introduction is written in first person by somebody who identifies himself as "Alexander, the Areopagite of Thracia, of Laodicean origins (birth)". The text contains a highly unorthodox prayer, reading "we pray to thee father Alexander, forgive us our sins by your will and give us salvation and the food of paradise, amen". In it, the author assumes powers usually reserved to God alone. The prayer is followed by prophecies by the author, who then calls for people to "leave your villages and homes" and to walk the Earth, spreading his message. Alexander then says "whoever listens to me, listens to Peter". This is followed by a highly original call along the lines of "leave your villages and homes", with dozens of phrases starting with "leave your" and listing several things, all starting with the Slavic prefix raz-: разлады, раздоры, расклады, развозы, распловы, разлогы, разлеты, размеры, размолвы, and so on (respectively: 'troubles', 'strifes', 'positions', 'moving around', 'sailing', 'flying', 'sizes', 'disagreements'). This unique sequence led Zaliznyak to believe that it was originally composed in Old Church Slavonic, as it was hard for him to imagine that translation from a foreign language would follow such a neat Slavic pattern.

A subsequent text contains the following passage: "The world is a town in which live the Armenians and the Africans and the Thracians and the Italians and the Spanish and the Greeks". Zaliznyak believed that an earlier allusion to Alexander, the Areopagite of Thracia is connected to listing Thracians early in the list.

Another text that Zaliznyak called "Spiritual Instruction from the Father and the Mother to the Son" contains the following note: "Въ лѣто ҂ѕ҃ф҃з҃ азъ мънихъ исаакии поставленъ попомъ въ соужъдали въ цръкъве свѧтаго александра арменина..." ('In 6507 [i.e. 999 CE] I, monk Isaakiy, was posted as a priest in Suzdal, at the church of St. Alexander the Armenian...'). The year 6507 reappears several times in the margins, and is the only number identified in the text. It continues onto an increasingly gloomier analysis of the state of the world, showing that the writer identifies with people excluded from the mainstream church for believing unorthodox teachings.

Zaliznyak postulated that the writer was the monk Isaakiy, who followed the previously-unknown schismatic teaching of the self-proclaimed prophet Alexander, an Armenian by birth, and that Alexander was based in Thracia, and Isaakiy was sent to spread Alexander's word in Suzdal. The "church of St. Alexander", according to Zaliznyak, does not mean a physical church building, but rather a church in the sense of teachings or doctrine. As there were no monasteries anywhere in the Rus' state at the time the texts were written, Zaliznyak believed that Isaakiy was educated and became a monk elsewhere. He was likely a witness to the Christianization of the Rus' in 988, and operated in a still largely pagan Rus' of the early 11th century. The concealed texts contain a conversion prayer, which in the first person (I and we) denies idolatry and accepts Christianity, so it is likely Isaakiy converted pagan Slavs.

The teachings of Alexander the Armenian were likely an early form of Bogomilism. The Nikonian Chronicle mentions a schismatic monk Andreyan jailed for disagreeing with the official church in 1004, during the time frame the codex was written. According to church historian Evgeny Golubinsky, Andreyan was a Bogomil, so the Novgorod Codex being found in the vicinity of a courthouse in the early 11th century leads to some theories.

Finally, the texts feature common allusions to the city of Laodicea, without any direct references to events there. Zaliznyak believed that Laodicea was a secret word among the Bogomils, identifying their teachings to each other without making them apparent to outsiders. In this context, the title of a schismatic work written 500 years later by Fyodor Kuritsyn, The Message of Laodicea, takes on a new light.

== List of texts ==
The following concealed texts, among others, have been found so far:

- a multitude of psalms, written down several times each
- the beginning of the Apocalypse of John
- a previously-unattested translation of John Chrysostom's treatise "On virginity" into Old Church Slavonic
- a multitude of alphabet examples, including a short version (а, б, в, г, д, е, ж, ѕ, з, и, ї, к, л, м, н, о, п, р, с, т, оу, ф, х, ц, ч, ш, щ, ѿ) and a full version, as well as the letter names (азъ, боукы, вѣдѣ, глаголи...).

In addition, several previously-unknown texts have been found, including a tetralogy "From Paganism to Christ" (as titled by Zaliznyak) comprising four texts: "Moses' Law" (Russian: Закон Моисеев), "The Unstrengthening and the Unpeacing" (Размаряющие и размиряющие), "Archangel Gabriel" (Архангел Гавриил), and "Jesus Christ's Law" (Закон Иисуса Христа). In addition, the text fragments "On the Concealed Church of Our Saviour Jesus Christ in Laodicea and On the Laodicean Prayer of Our Lord Jesus Christ", "Tale of the Apostle Paul on Moses' Secret Patericon", "Instruction by Alexander of Laodicea on the Forgiveness of Sins", and "Spiritual Instruction from the Father and the Mother to the Son" were identified.

The great number of previously-unknown texts in the codex might be explained by the writer belonging to a heretical Christian community according to the mainstream (Catholic and Orthodox) church – probably a dualistic group similar to the Bogomils. After the mainstream church had prevailed, the sect's texts were no longer copied and most traces of its existence were erased. An especially symptomatic example of the scribe's attitude to the mainstream church is the following excerpt from "Spiritual Instruction from the Father and the Mother to the Son":

Text	Translation
Миръ естъ градъ въ немъ же отълѫчаѭтъ отъ цръкъве еретикы.	The world is a town in which heretics are excluded from the church.
Миръ естъ градъ въ немъ же отълѫчаѭтъ отъ цръкъве чловѣкы неразоумъны.	The world is a town in which unwise people are excluded from the church.
Миръ естъ градъ въ немъ же отълѫчаѭтъ отъ цръкъве чловѣкы непокоривы.	The world is a town in which disobedient people are excluded from the church.
Миръ естъ градъ въ немъ же отълѫчаѭтъ отъ цръкъве чловѣкы непорочъны.	The world is a town in which blameless people are excluded from the church.
Миръ естъ градъ въ немъ же отълѫчаѭтъ отъ цръкъве чловѣкы невиновъны.	The world is a town in which innocent people are excluded from the church.
Миръ естъ градъ въ немъ же отълѫчаѭтъ отъ цръкъве чловѣкы непрѣломъны.	The world is a town in which inflexible people are excluded from the church.
Миръ естъ градъ въ немъ же отълѫчаѭтъ отъ цръкъве чловѣкы недостоины такоѩ кары.	The world is a town in which people not deserving of this punishment are excluded from the church.
Миръ естъ градъ въ немъ же отълѫчаѭтъ отъ цръкъве чловѣкы недостойны такого отълѫчения.	The world is a town in which people not deserving of this exclusion are excluded from the church.
Миръ естъ градъ въ немъ же отълѫчаѭтъ отъ цръкъве чловѣкы прѣчистыѩ вѣры.	The world is a town in which people of pure faith are excluded from the church.
Миръ естъ градъ въ немъ же отълѫчаѭтъ отъ цръкъве чловѣкы достоины хвалы.	The world is a town in which people worthy of praise are excluded from the church.
Миръ естъ градъ въ немъ же отълѫчаѭтъ отъ цръкъве чловѣкы достоины прославления.	The world is a town in which people worthy of veneration are excluded from the church.
Миръ естъ градъ въ немъ же отълѫчаѭтъ отъ цръкъве чловѣкы неотъстѫпъны отъ правыѩ вѣры х҃совы.	The world is a town in which people not forsaking the true faith in Christ are excluded from the church.

== See also ==
- Palimpsest
