= Psalm 57 =

Biblical psalm

- "Be merciful unto me, O God, be merciful unto me"
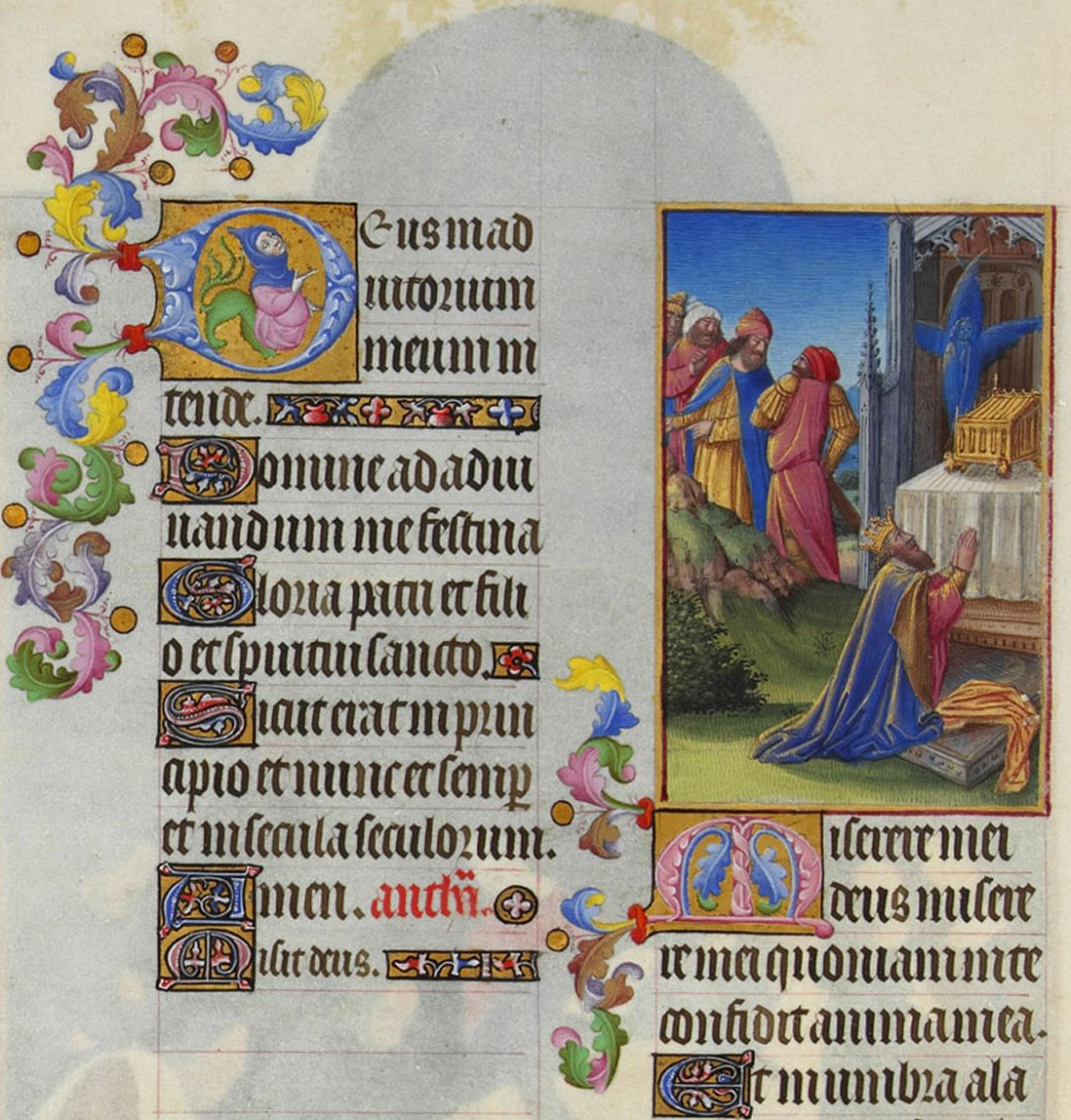
- Psalm 57 (Psalm LVI in the Vulgate) in Les Très Riches Heures du duc de Berry, Folio 157v, Musée Condé, Chantilly.
- Other name: Psalm 57; " Miserere mei Deus"
- Language: Hebrew (original)

Psalm 57
- ← Psalm 56 Psalm 58 →
- Book: Book of Psalms
- Hebrew Bible part: Ketuvim
- Order in the Hebrew part: 1
- Category: Sifrei Emet
- Christian Bible part: Old Testament
- Order in the Christian part: 19

Psalm 57 is the 57th psalm of the Book of Psalms, beginning in English in the King James Version: "Be merciful unto me, O God, be merciful unto me". In the slightly different numbering system of the Greek Septuagint version of the Bible and the Latin Vulgate, this psalm is Psalm 56. In Latin, it is known as "Miserere mei Deus". It is attributed to King David, and is described as a Michtam of David, when he fled from the face of Saul, in the cave, recalling either the cave of Adullam (1 Samuel 22), or the cave in the wilderness of En-gedi, on the western shore of the Dead Sea (1 Samuel 24).

The psalm forms a regular part of Jewish, Catholic, Lutheran, Anglican and other Protestant liturgies. It has been set to music.

== Structure ==
The psalm consists of two parts. In the first, verses 1–6, David gives expression to the anxiety which he felt, imploring Divine assistance against Saul and his other enemies. In the second part, verses 7–11, he proceeds upon the confident expectation of deliverance, and stirs up his soul to the exercise of praise.

== Melody ==
The psalm is addressed to a leader of worship; possibly this psalm was sung to a melody known as "Altaschith or "Do Not Destroy", although there is considerable uncertainty about this. A number of translations have chosen to transliterate the Hebrew expression as "al tashheth" (Tanakh) or "Al-tashheth" (Margolis). The same directive, "Do Not Destroy", can be found in the headings of Psalm 58 and Psalm 59.

== Uses ==
=== Judaism ===
Verse 3 is found in the repetition of the Amidah on Rosh Hashanah.

=== Coptic Orthodox Church ===
In the Agpeya, the Coptic Church's book of hours, this psalm is prayed in the office of Sext. It is also in the prayer of the Veil, which is generally prayed only by monks.

=== Book of Common Prayer ===
In the Church of England's Book of Common Prayer, this psalm is appointed to be read on the morning of the 11th day of the month, and it is a Proper Psalm for Mattins on Easter Day.

== Musical settings ==
Heinrich Schütz set Psalm 57 in a metred version in German, "Sei mir gnädig, o Gott, mein Herr", SWV 154, as part of the Becker Psalter, first published in 1628. Johann Vierdanck set verses 8–12 in German as a sacred concerto, Mein Herz ist bereit, Gott (My heart is ready, God) for two voices, two violins and continuo, c. 1640.

== Text ==
The following table shows the Hebrew text of the Psalm with vowels, alongside the Koine Greek text in the Septuagint and the English translation from the King James Version. Note that the meaning can slightly differ between these versions, as the Septuagint and the Masoretic Text come from different textual traditions. (Note: A 1917 translation directly from Hebrew to English by the Jewish Publication Society can be found here or here, and an 1844 translation directly from the Septuagint by L. C. L. Brenton can be found here. Both translations are in the public domain.) In the Septuagint, this psalm is numbered Psalm 56.

#	Hebrew	English	Greek
(Note: In the Jewish verse numbering, the ascription of this psalm is verse 1, and the rest of the psalm begins from verse 2. However, the Christian verse numbering does not count the ascription.)	לַמְנַצֵּ֣חַ אַל־תַּ֭שְׁחֵת לְדָוִ֣ד מִכְתָּ֑ם בְּבׇרְח֥וֹ מִפְּנֵי־שָׁ֝א֗וּל בַּמְּעָרָֽה׃	(To the chief Musician, Altaschith, Michtam of David, when he fled from Saul in the cave.)	Εἰς τὸ τέλος· μὴ διαφθείρῃς· τῷ Δαυΐδ εἰς στηλογραφίαν ἐν τῷ αὐτὸν ἀποδιδράσκειν ἀπὸ προσώπου Σαοὺλ εἰς τὸ σπήλαιον. -
1	חׇנֵּ֤נִי אֱלֹהִ֨ים ׀ חׇנֵּ֗נִי כִּ֥י בְךָ֮ חָסָ֢יָה נַ֫פְשִׁ֥י וּבְצֵֽל־כְּנָפֶ֥יךָ אֶחְסֶ֑ה עַ֝֗ד יַעֲבֹ֥ר הַוּֽוֹת׃	Be merciful unto me, O God, be merciful unto me: for my soul trusteth in thee: yea, in the shadow of thy wings will I make my refuge, until these calamities be overpast.	ΕΛΕΗΣΟΝ με, ὁ Θεός, ἐλέησόν με, ὅτι ἐπὶ σοὶ πέποιθεν ἡ ψυχή μου καὶ ἐν τῇ σκιᾷ τῶν πτερύγων σου ἐλπιῶ, ἕως οὗ παρέλθῃ ἡ ἀνομία.
2	אֶ֭קְרָא לֵֽאלֹהִ֣ים עֶלְי֑וֹן לָ֝אֵ֗ל גֹּמֵ֥ר עָלָֽי׃	I will cry unto God most high; unto God that performeth all things for me.	κεκράξομαι πρὸς τὸν Θεὸν τὸν ῞Υψιστον, τὸν Θεὸν τὸν εὐεργετήσαντά με.
3	יִשְׁלַ֤ח מִשָּׁמַ֨יִם ׀ וְֽיוֹשִׁיעֵ֗נִי חֵרֵ֣ף שֹׁאֲפִ֣י סֶ֑לָה יִשְׁלַ֥ח אֱ֝לֹהִ֗ים חַסְדּ֥וֹ וַאֲמִתּֽוֹ׃	He shall send from heaven, and save me from the reproach of him that would swallow me up. Selah. God shall send forth his mercy and his truth.	ἐξαπέστειλεν ἐξ οὐρανοῦ καὶ ἔσωσέ με, ἔδωκεν εἰς ὄνειδος τοὺς καταπατοῦντάς με. (διάψαλμα). ἐξαπέστειλεν ὁ Θεὸς τὸ ἔλεος αὐτοῦ καὶ τὴν ἀλήθειαν αὐτοῦ
4	נַפְשִׁ֤י ׀ בְּת֥וֹךְ לְבָאִם֮ אֶשְׁכְּבָ֢ה לֹ֫הֲטִ֥ים בְּֽנֵי־אָדָ֗ם שִׁ֭נֵּיהֶם חֲנִ֣ית וְחִצִּ֑ים וּ֝לְשׁוֹנָ֗ם חֶ֣רֶב חַדָּֽה׃	My soul is among lions: and I lie even among them that are set on fire, even the sons of men, whose teeth are spears and arrows, and their tongue a sharp sword.	καὶ ἐρρύσατο τὴν ψυχήν μου ἐκ μέσου σκύμνων. ἐκοιμήθην τεταραγμένος· υἱοὶ ἀνθρώπων, οἱ ὀδόντες αὐτῶν ὅπλα καὶ βέλη, καὶ ἡ γλῶσσα αὐτῶν μάχαιρα ὀξεῖα.
5	ר֣וּמָה עַל־הַשָּׁמַ֣יִם אֱלֹהִ֑ים עַ֖ל כׇּל־הָאָ֣רֶץ כְּבוֹדֶֽךָ׃	Be thou exalted, O God, above the heavens; let thy glory be above all the earth.	ὑψώθητι ἐπὶ τοὺς οὐρανούς, ὁ Θεός, καὶ ἐπὶ πᾶσαν τὴν γῆν ἡ δόξα σου.
6	רֶ֤שֶׁת ׀ הֵכִ֣ינוּ לִפְעָמַי֮ כָּפַ֢ף נַ֫פְשִׁ֥י כָּר֣וּ לְפָנַ֣י שִׁיחָ֑ה נָפְל֖וּ בְתוֹכָ֣הּ סֶֽלָה׃	They have prepared a net for my steps; my soul is bowed down: they have digged a pit before me, into the midst whereof they are fallen themselves. Selah.	παγίδα ἡτοίμασαν τοῖς ποσί μου καὶ κατέκαμψαν τὴν ψυχήν μου· ὤρυξαν πρὸ προσώπου μου βόθρον καὶ ἐνέπεσαν εἰς αὐτόν. (διάψαλμα).
7	נָ֘כ֤וֹן לִבִּ֣י אֱ֭לֹהִים נָכ֣וֹן לִבִּ֑י אָ֝שִׁ֗ירָה וַאֲזַמֵּֽרָה׃	My heart is fixed, O God, my heart is fixed: I will sing and give praise.	ἑτοίμη ἡ καρδία μου, ὁ Θεός, ἑτοίμη ἡ καρδία μου, ᾄσομαι καὶ ψαλῶ ἐν τῇ δόξῃ μου.
8	ע֤וּרָה כְבוֹדִ֗י ע֭וּרָֽה הַנֵּ֥בֶל וְכִנּ֗וֹר אָעִ֥ירָה שָּֽׁחַר׃	Awake up, my glory; awake, psaltery and harp: I myself will awake early.	ἐξεγέρθητι, ἡ δόξα μου· ἐξεγέρθητι, ψαλτήριον καὶ κιθάρα· ἐξεγερθήσομαι ὄρθρου.
9	אוֹדְךָ֖ בָעַמִּ֥ים ׀ אֲדֹנָ֑י אֲ֝זַמֶּרְךָ֗ בַּלְאֻמִּֽים׃	I will praise thee, O Lord, among the people: I will sing unto thee among the nations.	ἐξομολογήσομαί σοι ἐν λαοῖς, Κύριε, ψαλῶ σοι ἐν ἔθνεσι,
10	כִּֽי־גָדֹ֣ל עַד־שָׁמַ֣יִם חַסְדֶּ֑ךָ וְֽעַד־שְׁחָקִ֥ים אֲמִתֶּֽךָ׃	For thy mercy is great unto the heavens, and thy truth unto the clouds.	ὅτι ἐμεγαλύνθη ἕως τῶν οὐρανῶν τὸ ἔλεός σου καὶ ἕως τῶν νεφελῶν ἡ ἀλήθειά σου.
11	ר֣וּמָה עַל־שָׁמַ֣יִם אֱלֹהִ֑ים עַ֖ל כׇּל־הָאָ֣רֶץ כְּבוֹדֶֽךָ׃	Be thou exalted, O God, above the heavens: let thy glory be above all the earth.	ὑψώθητι ἐπὶ τοὺς οὐρανούς, ὁ Θεός, καὶ ἐπὶ πᾶσαν τὴν γῆν ἡ δόξα σου.

=== Verse 6 ===
They have prepared a net for my steps;
My soul is bowed down;
They have dug a pit before me;
Into the midst of it they themselves have fallen.

Alexander Kirkpatrick suggests that the reference to David's enemies being caught in their own trap indicates an affinity with the cave of En-gedi mentioned in 1 Samuel 24:1–3.
