= Psalm 58 =

Biblical psalm

- "Do ye indeed speak righteousness, O congregation?"
- Psalm 58 from Thomas Ravenscroft's Psalter: The Whole Booke of Psalmes
- Other name: Psalm 57; "Si vere utique"
- Language: Hebrew (original)

Psalm 58
- ← Psalm 57 Psalm 59 →
- Book: Book of Psalms
- Hebrew Bible part: Ketuvim
- Order in the Hebrew part: 1
- Category: Sifrei Emet
- Christian Bible part: Old Testament
- Order in the Christian part: 19

Psalm 58 is the 58th psalm of the Book of Psalms, beginning in English in the King James Version: "Do ye indeed speak righteousness, O congregation?". In the slightly different numbering system of the Greek Septuagint version of the Bible and the Latin Vulgate, this psalm is Psalm 57. In Latin, it is known as Si vere utique.

It is one of six psalms labeled a michtam, which may mean an "engraving", "sculpture", "golden", or "secret". It is also classified as one of the Imprecatory Psalms. Psalm 58 is a companion piece to Psalm 57, which also describes David's difficult relationship with Saul, and both psalms refer in their headings to Altaschith or "Do Not Destroy", possibly an ancient song whose tune was to be used in singing the psalms.

The psalm forms a regular part of Jewish, Catholic, Lutheran, Anglican and other Protestant liturgies. It has been set to music.

== Themes ==
The Midrash Tehillim connects the words Al taschet (Hebrew: אַל-תַּשְׁחֵת, do not destroy) in the Hebrew verse 1 to the episode when David took Abishai into Saul's camp and had the opportunity to kill Saul as he slept. David said, "Al tashhitahu (Hebrew: אַל-תַּשְׁחִיתֵהוּ, do not destroy him" (1 Samuel 26:9), which echoes these words, setting Saul's animosity toward David as the theme of this psalm. The psalm also alludes to Abner, the chief of Saul's army, who would not admit to David's righteousness when David refrained from killing Saul in the cave. Henry suggests that David composed Psalm 58 after Saul used the force of law to brand David as a traitor to the crown.

David exhorts at length against either wicked people or wicked judges, the latter possibly referring to those who sided with Saul. David uses highly descriptive language comparing the wicked to snakes, serpents, cobras, and lions, and prays to God to "smash their teeth in their mouth, shatter the molars of young lions…His arrows, may they be as if crumbled to pieces".

Quoting Jerome, George Haydock avers that the depiction of the wicked judges refers "to the proceedings of the Jews against Christ", and adds that the psalm decries "hypocrites" and "detractors".

== Uses ==
=== Judaism ===
Verse 9 in the Hebrew is said by the snail in Perek Shirah.

The entire chapter is recited as protection from an aggressive dog.

=== Catholic Church ===
From the early Middle Ages monasteries used this psalm at the Matins office on Tuesday, according to the Rule of St. Benedict of Nursia which was established around 530.

In the revision of the Liturgy of the Hours following the Second Vatican Council, this psalm was deemed unsuitable for continued use in the Office, and is therefore omitted from the 1971 Liturgy of the Hours.

=== Book of Common Prayer ===
In the Church of England's Book of Common Prayer, this psalm is appointed to be read on the morning of the eleventh day of the month.

=== Omission in various lectionaries ===
Because this is an imprecatory Psalm, the 1962 Canadian Book of Common Prayer leaves out Psalm 58 (and Psalm 137). A number of various other imprecatory Psalms are omitted from a number of lectionaries usually having Psalm 58 among those redacted. Evangelicals tend to disagree and see a value in these passages.

== Musical settings ==
Heinrich Schütz set Psalm 58 in a metred version in German, "Wie nun, ihr Herren, seid ihr stumm", SWV 155, as part of the Becker Psalter, first published in 1628.

== Text ==
The following table shows the Hebrew text of the Psalm with vowels, alongside the Koine Greek text in the Septuagint and the English translation from the King James Version. Note that the meaning can slightly differ between these versions, as the Septuagint and the Masoretic Text come from different textual traditions. (Note: A 1917 translation directly from Hebrew to English by the Jewish Publication Society can be found here or here, and an 1844 translation directly from the Septuagint by L. C. L. Brenton can be found here. Both translations are in the public domain.) In the Septuagint, this psalm is numbered Psalm 57.

#	Hebrew	English	Greek
(Note: In the Jewish verse numbering, the ascription of this psalm is verse 1, and the rest of the psalm begins from verse 2. However, the Christian verse numbering does not count the ascription.)	לַמְנַצֵּ֥חַ אַל־תַּשְׁחֵ֗ת לְדָוִ֥ד מִכְתָּֽם׃	(To the chief Musician, Altaschith, Michtam of David.)	Εἰς τὸ τέλος· μὴ διαφθείρῃς· τῷ Δαυΐδ εἰς στηλογραφίαν. -
1	הַאֻמְנָ֗ם אֵ֣לֶם צֶ֭דֶק תְּדַבֵּר֑וּן מֵישָׁרִ֥ים תִּ֝שְׁפְּט֗וּ בְּנֵ֣י אָדָֽם׃	Do ye indeed speak righteousness, O congregation? do ye judge uprightly, O ye sons of men?	ΕΙ ΑΛΗΘΩΣ ἄρα δικαιοσύνην λαλεῖτε; εὐθείας κρίνετε οἱ υἱοὶ τῶν ἀνθρώπων;
2	אַף־בְּלֵב֮ עוֹלֹ֢ת תִּפְעָ֫ל֥וּן בָּאָ֡רֶץ חֲמַ֥ס יְ֝דֵיכֶ֗ם תְּפַלֵּסֽוּן׃	Yea, in heart ye work wickedness; ye weigh the violence of your hands in the earth.	καὶ γὰρ ἐν καρδίᾳ ἀνομίαν ἐργάζεσθε ἐν τῇ γῇ, ἀδικίαν αἱ χεῖρες ὑμῶν συμπλέκουσιν.
3	זֹ֣רוּ רְשָׁעִ֣ים מֵרָ֑חֶם תָּע֥וּ מִ֝בֶּ֗טֶן דֹּבְרֵ֥י כָזָֽב׃	The wicked are estranged from the womb: they go astray as soon as they be born, speaking lies.	ἀπηλλοτριώθησαν οἱ ἁμαρτωλοὶ ἀπὸ μήτρας, ἐπλανήθησαν ἀπὸ γαστρός, ἐλάλησαν ψευδῆ.
4	חֲמַת־לָ֗מוֹ כִּדְמ֥וּת חֲמַת־נָחָ֑שׁ כְּמוֹ־פֶ֥תֶן חֵ֝רֵ֗שׁ יַאְטֵ֥ם אׇזְנֽוֹ׃	Their poison is like the poison of a serpent: they are like the deaf adder that stoppeth her ear;	θυμὸς αὐτοῖς κατὰ τὴν ὁμοίωσιν τοῦ ὄφεως, ὡσεὶ ἀσπίδος κωφῆς καὶ βυούσης τὰ ὦτα αὐτῆς,
5	אֲשֶׁ֣ר לֹֽא־יִ֭שְׁמַע לְק֣וֹל מְלַחֲשִׁ֑ים חוֹבֵ֖ר חֲבָרִ֣ים מְחֻכָּֽם׃	Which will not hearken to the voice of charmers, charming never so wisely.	ἥτις οὐκ εἰσακούσεται φωνῆς ἐπᾳδόντων, φαρμάκου τε φαρμακευομένου παρὰ σοφοῦ.
6	אֱֽלֹהִ֗ים הֲרׇס־שִׁנֵּ֥ימֽוֹ בְּפִ֑ימוֹ מַלְתְּע֥וֹת כְּ֝פִירִ֗ים נְתֹ֣ץ ׀ יְהֹוָֽה׃	Break their teeth, O God, in their mouth: break out the great teeth of the young lions, O LORD.	ὁ Θεὸς συντρίψει τοὺς ὀδόντας αὐτῶν ἐν τῷ στόματι αὐτῶν, τὰς μύλας τῶν λεόντων συνέθλασεν ὁ Κύριος·
7	יִמָּאֲס֣וּ כְמוֹ־מַ֭יִם יִתְהַלְּכוּ־לָ֑מוֹ יִדְרֹ֥ךְ חִ֝צָּ֗ו כְּמ֣וֹ יִתְמֹלָֽלוּ׃	Let them melt away as waters which run continually: when he bendeth his bow to shoot his arrows, let them be as cut in pieces.	ἐξουδενωθήσονται ὡσεὶ ὕδωρ διαπορευόμενον· ἐκτενεῖ τὸ τόξον αὐτοῦ ἕως οὗ ἀσθενήσουσιν.
8	כְּמ֣וֹ שַׁ֭בְּלוּל תֶּ֣מֶס יַהֲלֹ֑ךְ נֵ֥פֶל אֵ֝֗שֶׁת בַּל־חָ֥זוּ שָֽׁמֶשׁ׃	As a snail which melteth, let every one of them pass away: like the untimely birth of a woman, that they may not see the sun.	ὡσεὶ κηρὸς τακεὶς ἀνταναιρεθήσονται· ἔπεσε πῦρ ἐπ᾿ αὐτούς, καὶ οὐκ εἶδον τὸν ἥλιον.
9	בְּטֶ֤רֶם ׀ יָבִ֣ינוּ סִּירֹתֵכֶ֣ם אָטָ֑ד כְּמוֹ־חַ֥י כְּמוֹ־חָ֝ר֗וֹן יִשְׂעָרֶֽנּוּ׃	Before your pots can feel the thorns, he shall take them away as with a whirlwind, both living, and in his wrath.	πρὸ τοῦ συνιέναι τὰς ἀκάνθας αὐτῶν τὴν ῥάμνον, ὡσεὶ ζῶντας, ὡσεὶ ἐν ὀργῇ καταπίεται αὐτούς.
10	יִשְׂמַ֣ח צַ֭דִּיק כִּי־חָזָ֣ה נָקָ֑ם פְּעָמָ֥יו יִ֝רְחַ֗ץ בְּדַ֣ם הָרָשָֽׁע׃	The righteous shall rejoice when he seeth the vengeance: he shall wash his feet in the blood of the wicked.	εὐφρανθήσεται δίκαιος, ὅταν ἴδῃ ἐκδίκησιν· τὰς χεῖρας αὐτοῦ νίψεται ἐν τῷ αἵματι τοῦ ἁμαρτωλοῦ.
11	וְיֹאמַ֣ר אָ֭דָם אַךְ־פְּרִ֣י לַצַּדִּ֑יק אַ֥ךְ יֵשׁ־אֱ֝לֹהִ֗ים שֹׁפְטִ֥ים בָּאָֽרֶץ׃	So that a man shall say, Verily there is a reward for the righteous: verily he is a God that judgeth in the earth.	καὶ ἐρεῖ ἄνθρωπος· εἰ ἄρα ἐστὶ καρπὸς τῷ δικαίῳ, ἄρα ἐστὶν ὁ Θεὸς κρίνων αὐτοὺς ἐν τῇ γῇ.
