= Psalm 54 =

Biblical psalm

- "Save me, O God, by thy name"
- Beginning of Psalm 54 in Latin, Psalter in the Cleveland Museum of Art
- Other name: Psalm 53; "Deus in nomine tuo salvum me fac"
- Text: Attributed to King David
- Language: Hebrew (original)

Psalm 54
- ← Psalm 53 Psalm 55 →
- Book: Book of Psalms
- Hebrew Bible part: Ketuvim
- Order in the Hebrew part: 1
- Category: Sifrei Emet
- Christian Bible part: Old Testament
- Order in the Christian part: 19

Psalm 54 is the 54th psalm of the Book of Psalms, beginning in English in the King James Version: "Save me, O God, by thy name, and judge me by thy strength". In the slightly different numbering system used in the Greek Septuagint and Latin Vulgate translations of the Bible, this psalm is Psalm 53. In Latin, it is known as "Deus in nomine tuo salvum me fac", Attributed to David, it was written for one who finds oneself betrayed by a friend.

The psalm forms a regular part of Jewish, Catholic, Eastern Orthodox and Protestant liturgies.

== Commentary ==
The historical setting of this short Psalm is given in its title, almost a direct quotation from 1 Samuel 23:19 (a similar style of historical setting as with Psalm 52). It is considered one of the psalms containing prayers against false accusations, linked with an ordeal, the taking of an oath, or an appeal to the 'higher court', as indicated in the following points:

- The phrase 'vindicate me' (verse 1)
- A royal perspective of opponents as 'strangers' (verse 3; the New Revised Standard Version amends to 'the insolent'), 'the ruthless' (verse 3), and 'enemies' (verse 5)
- A prayer before battle appealing to God as personal savior with a covenant 'faithfulness' (verse 5).

It can also be described as a lament, prayer, or complaint of an individual.

Verses 1-3 pray for help and answer. Following an appeal (verses 1–2), the psalmist describes the danger facing him (verse 3), but maintains his confidence in God. In the second half of the psalm (verses 4–7), the poet, in the certainty of being heard, rejoices in help, and makes a vow of thanksgiving, he promises to sacrifice a free-will offering to express 'the voluntary gratitude of a thankful heart' (verses 6–7, another example of the 'certainty of hearing').

== Uses ==
=== Coptic Orthodox Church ===
In the Agpeya, the Coptic Church's book of hours, this psalm is prayed in the office of Sext.

=== Book of Common Prayer ===
In the Church of England's Book of Common Prayer, this psalm is appointed to be read on the evening of the tenth day of the month.

The Psalm is a Proper Psalm for Mattins on Good Friday.

=== Musical settings ===
Heinrich Schütz set Psalm 54 in a metred version in German, "Hilf mir, Gott, durch den Namen dein", SWV 151, as part of the Becker Psalter, first published in 1628. Alan Hovhaness set text from this Psalm and from Psalms 55 and 56 in his choral work Make a Joyful Noise.

== Text ==
The following table shows the Hebrew text of the Psalm with vowels, alongside the Koine Greek text in the Septuagint and the English translation from the King James Version. Note that the meaning can slightly differ between these versions, as the Septuagint and the Masoretic Text come from different textual traditions. (Note: A 1917 translation directly from Hebrew to English by the Jewish Publication Society can be found here or here, and an 1844 translation directly from the Septuagint by L. C. L. Brenton can be found here. Both translations are in the public domain.) In the Septuagint, this psalm is numbered Psalm 53.

#	Hebrew	English	Greek
(Note: In the Jewish verse numbering, the ascription of this psalm is verses 1 and 2, and the rest of the psalm begins from verse 3. However, the Christian verse numbering does not count the ascription.)	לַמְנַצֵּ֥חַ בִּנְגִינֹ֗ת מַשְׂכִּ֥יל לְדָוִֽד׃	(To the chief Musician on Neginoth, Maschil, A Psalm of David,	Εἰς τὸ τέλος, ἐν ὕμνοις· συνέσεως τῷ Δαυΐδ
	בְּבֹ֣א הַ֭זִּיפִים וַיֹּאמְר֣וּ לְשָׁא֑וּל הֲלֹ֥א דָ֝וִ֗ד מִסְתַּתֵּ֥ר עִמָּֽנוּ׃	when the Ziphims came and said to Saul, Doth not David hide himself with us?)	ἐν τῷ ἐλθεῖν τοὺς Ζιφαίους καὶ εἰπεῖν τῷ Σαούλ· οὐκ ἰδοὺ Δαυΐδ κέκρυπται παρ᾿ ἡμῖν; -
1	אֱ֭לֹהִים בְּשִׁמְךָ֣ הוֹשִׁיעֵ֑נִי וּבִגְבוּרָתְךָ֥ תְדִינֵֽנִי׃	Save me, O God, by thy name, and judge me by thy strength.	Ο ΘΕΟΣ, ἐν τῷ ὀνόματί σου σῶσόν με καὶ ἐν τῇ δυνάμει σου κρῖνόν με.
2	אֱ֭לֹהִים שְׁמַ֣ע תְּפִלָּתִ֑י הַ֝אֲזִ֗ינָה לְאִמְרֵי־פִֽי׃	Hear my prayer, O God; give ear to the words of my mouth.	ὁ Θεός, εἰσάκουσον τῆς προσευχῆς μου, ἐνώτισαι τὰ ῥήματα τοῦ στόματός μου.
3	כִּ֤י זָרִ֨ים ׀ קָ֤מוּ עָלַ֗י וְֽ֭עָרִיצִים בִּקְשׁ֣וּ נַפְשִׁ֑י לֹ֤א שָׂ֨מוּ אֱלֹהִ֖ים לְנֶגְדָּ֣ם סֶֽלָה׃	For strangers are risen up against me, and oppressors seek after my soul: they have not set God before them. Selah.	ὅτι ἀλλότριοι ἐπανέστησαν ἐπ᾿ ἐμὲ καὶ κραταιοὶ ἐζήτησαν τὴν ψυχήν μου καὶ οὐ προέθεντο τὸν Θεὸν ἐνώπιον αὐτῶν. (διάψαλμα).
4	הִנֵּ֣ה אֱ֭לֹהִים עֹזֵ֣ר לִ֑י אֲ֝דֹנָ֗י בְּֽסֹמְכֵ֥י נַפְשִֽׁי׃	Behold, God is mine helper: the Lord is with them that uphold my soul.	ἰδοὺ γὰρ ὁ Θεὸς βοηθεῖ μοι, καὶ ὁ Κύριος ἀντιλήπτωρ τῆς ψυχῆς μου.
5	(ישוב) [יָשִׁ֣יב] הָ֭רַע לְשֹׁרְרָ֑י בַּ֝אֲמִתְּךָ֗ הַצְמִיתֵֽם׃	He shall reward evil unto mine enemies: cut them off in thy truth.	ἀποστρέψει τὰ κακὰ τοῖς ἐχθροῖς μου· ἐν τῇ ἀληθείᾳ σου ἐξολόθρευσον αὐτούς.
6	בִּנְדָבָ֥ה אֶזְבְּחָה־לָּ֑ךְ א֤וֹדֶה שִּׁמְךָ֖ יְהֹוָ֣ה כִּי־טֽוֹב׃	I will freely sacrifice unto thee: I will praise thy name, O LORD; for it is good.	ἑκουσίως θύσω σοι, ἐξομολογήσομαι τῷ ὀνόματί σου, Κύριε, ὅτι ἀγαθόν·
7	כִּ֣י מִכׇּל־צָ֭רָה הִצִּילָ֑נִי וּ֝בְאֹיְבַ֗י רָאֲתָ֥ה עֵינִֽי׃	For he hath delivered me out of all trouble: and mine eye hath seen his desire upon mine enemies.	ὅτι ἐκ πάσης θλίψεως ἐρρύσω με, καὶ ἐν τοῖς ἐχθροῖς μου ἐπεῖδεν ὁ ὀφθαλμός μου.

The Ziphims lived in the wilderness of Ziph, a district to the south-east of Hebron in the Judean mountains.
