= Altaschith =

Altaschith (Hebrew: אל תשחית; Hebrew pronunciation: [ˈʔal taʃˈχit]) is a Hebrew phrase sometimes translated "do not destroy". It was used in the titles of Psalms 57, 58, 59, and 75. Scholars have not reached agreement about its meaning, but it may have been a reference to an ancient song whose tune was to be used in singing the Psalms.
