= Psalm 76 =

Biblical psalm

- "In Judah is God known; His name is great in Israel"
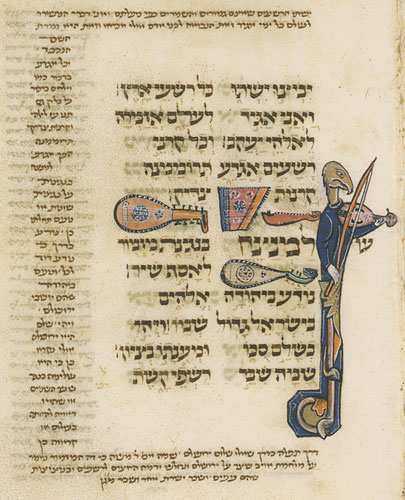
- Folio 105a - Psalm 76. The Parma Psalters from about 1280 AD (Ms. Parm. 1870; Cod. De Rossi 510; Palatina Library) now in Parma, Italy.
- Other name: "Notus in Judaea"
- Text: by Asaph
- Language: Hebrew (original)

Psalm 76
- ← Psalm 75 Psalm 77 →
- Book: Book of Psalms
- Hebrew Bible part: Ketuvim
- Order in the Hebrew part: 1
- Category: Sifrei Emet
- Christian Bible part: Old Testament
- Order in the Christian part: 19

Psalm 76 is the 76th psalm of the Book of Psalms, beginning in English in the King James Version: "In Judah is God known; His name is great in Israel". The Book of Psalms forms part of the Ketuvim section of the Hebrew Bible and part of the Christian Old Testament. In the slightly different numbering system of the Greek Septuagint version of the bible, and in the Latin Vulgate, this psalm is Psalm 75. In Latin, it is known as "Notus in Judaea". It is one of the psalms of Asaph. It refers to the "Majesty of God in Judgment". The Jerusalem Bible regards it as an "ode to God the awe-inspiring".

This psalm forms a regular part of Jewish, Catholic, Lutheran, Anglican and other Protestant liturgies. It has been set to music, including in works in German by Heinrich Schütz, and in Latin by Marc-Antoine Charpentier and Jean-Baptiste Lully.

== Commentary ==
This psalm shares some similarities with Psalms 46 and 48, and has been interpreted as:

1. a celebration of Israelite victory over their enemies
2. a part of the New Year Festival in Jerusalem
3. a prophecy of God's future victory,
4. a post-exilic praise.

The division of the text (e.g., in the New Revised Standard Version) is usually:

1. verses 1–3: praise God who chose Zion as his dwelling and defended his city
2. verses 4–6: describe God's victory
3. verses 7–9: portray 'a judge who saves the humble'
4. verses 10–12: declare that all human beings will worship YHWH and tell them to perform their vows.

According to Gordon Churchyard in the EasyEnglish Translation of the Psalms, this psalm explains that Judah and Israel are both names for God's chosen people. The Jerusalem Bible suggests that the psalm "apparently refers to the defeat of Sennacherib in 701 BC at the gates of Jerusalem": see also Assyrian siege of Jerusalem.

The Sela in verses 3 and 9 provides a 'threefold structure' with the middle section focusing on the 'description of God'.

== Uses ==
=== Judaism ===
This psalm is recited on the first day of Sukkot.

=== Book of Common Prayer ===
In the Church of England's Book of Common Prayer, this psalm is appointed to be read on the morning of the fifteenth day of the month.

== Musical settings ==
Heinrich Schütz set Psalm 76 in a metred version in German, "In Juda ist der Herr bekannt", SWV 173, as part of the Becker Psalter, first published in 1628.

Marc-Antoine Charpentier set :

- Notus in Judea Deus H.179, for 3 voices, 2 treble instruments and continuo (1681),
- Notus in Judea Deus H.219, for soloists, chorus, flutes, strings and continuo (? early1690s).

Jean-Baptiste Lully set it as a motet, Notus in Judea Deus, LWV 77.

== Text ==
The following table shows the Hebrew text of the Psalm with vowels, alongside the Koine Greek text in the Septuagint and the English translation from the King James Version. Note that the meaning can slightly differ between these versions, as the Septuagint and the Masoretic Text come from different textual traditions. (Note: A 1917 translation directly from Hebrew to English by the Jewish Publication Society can be found here or here, and an 1844 translation directly from the Septuagint by L. C. L. Brenton can be found here. Both translations are in the public domain.) In the Septuagint, this psalm is numbered Psalm 75.

| # | Hebrew | English | Greek |
|---|---|---|---|
| (Note: In the Jewish verse numbering, the ascription of this psalm is verse 1, and the rest of the psalm begins from verse 2. However, the Christian verse numbering does not count the ascription.) | לַמְנַצֵּ֥חַ בִּנְגִינֹ֑ת מִזְמ֖וֹר לְאָסָ֣ף שִֽׁיר׃ | (To the chief Musician on Neginoth, A Psalm or Song of Asaph.) | Εἰς τὸ τέλος, ἐν ὕμνοις· ψαλμὸς τῷ ᾿Ασάφ, ᾠδὴ πρὸς τὸν ᾿Ασσύριον. - |
| 1 | נוֹדָ֣ע בִּיהוּדָ֣ה אֱלֹהִ֑ים בְּ֝יִשְׂרָאֵ֗ל גָּד֥וֹל שְׁמֽוֹ׃ | In Judah is God known: his name is great in Israel. | ΓΝΩΣΤΟΣ ἐν τῇ ᾿Ιουδαίᾳ ὁ Θεός, ἐν τῷ ᾿Ισραὴλ μέγα τὸ ὄνομα αὐτοῦ. |
| 2 | וַיְהִ֣י בְשָׁלֵ֣ם סוּכּ֑וֹ וּמְע֖וֹנָת֣וֹ בְצִיּֽוֹן׃ | In Salem also is his tabernacle, and his dwelling place in Zion. | καὶ ἐγενήθη ἐν εἰρήνῃ ὁ τόπος αὐτοῦ, καὶ τὸ κατοικητήριον αὐτοῦ ἐν Σιών· |
| 3 | שָׁ֭מָּה שִׁבַּ֣ר רִשְׁפֵי־קָ֑שֶׁת מָגֵ֬ן וְחֶ֖רֶב וּמִלְחָמָ֣ה סֶֽלָה׃ | There brake he the arrows of the bow, the shield, and the sword, and the battle. Selah. | ἐκεῖ συνέτριψε τὰ κράτη τῶν τόξων, ὅπλον καὶ ῥομφαίαν καὶ πόλεμον. (διάψαλμα). |
| 4 | נָ֭אוֹר אַתָּ֥ה אַדִּ֗יר מֵֽהַרְרֵי־טָֽרֶף׃ | Thou art more glorious and excellent than the mountains of prey. | φωτίζεις σὺ θαυμαστῶς ἀπὸ ὀρέων αἰωνίων· |
| 5 | אֶשְׁתּֽוֹלְל֨וּ ׀ אַבִּ֣ירֵי לֵ֭ב נָמ֣וּ שְׁנָתָ֑ם וְלֹֽא־מָצְא֖וּ כׇל־אַנְשֵׁי־חַ֣יִל יְדֵיהֶֽם׃ | The stouthearted are spoiled, they have slept their sleep: and none of the men of might have found their hands. | ἐταράχθησαν πάντες οἱ ἀσύνετοι τῇ καρδίᾳ, ὕπνωσαν ὕπνον αὐτῶν καὶ οὐχ εὗρον οὐδὲν πάντες οἱ ἄνδρες τοῦ πλούτου ταῖς χερσὶν αὐτῶν. |
| 6 | מִ֭גַּעֲרָ֣תְךָ אֱלֹהֵ֣י יַעֲקֹ֑ב נִ֝רְדָּ֗ם וְרֶ֣כֶב וָסֽוּס׃ | At thy rebuke, O God of Jacob, both the chariot and horse are cast into a dead sleep. | ἀπὸ ἐπιτιμήσεώς σου, ὁ Θεὸς ᾿Ιακώβ, ἐνύσταξαν οἱ ἐπιβεβηκότες τοῖς ἵπποις. |
| 7 | אַתָּ֤ה ׀ נ֥וֹרָא אַ֗תָּה וּמִֽי־יַעֲמֹ֥ד לְפָנֶ֗יךָ מֵאָ֥ז אַפֶּֽךָ׃ | Thou, even thou, art to be feared: and who may stand in thy sight when once thou art angry? | σὺ φοβερὸς εἶ, καὶ τίς ἀντιστήσεταί σοι; ἀπὸ τότε ἡ ὀργή σου. |
| 8 | מִ֭שָּׁמַיִם הִשְׁמַ֣עְתָּ דִּ֑ין אֶ֖רֶץ יָֽרְאָ֣ה וְשָׁקָֽטָה׃ | Thou didst cause judgment to be heard from heaven; the earth feared, and was still, | ἐκ τοῦ οὐρανοῦ ἠκούτισας κρίσιν, γῆ ἐφοβήθη καὶ ἡσύχασεν |
| 9 | בְּקוּם־לַמִּשְׁפָּ֥ט אֱלֹהִ֑ים לְהוֹשִׁ֖יעַ כׇּל־עַנְוֵי־אֶ֣רֶץ סֶֽלָה׃ | When God arose to judgment, to save all the meek of the earth. Selah. | ἐν τῷ ἀναστῆναι εἰς κρίσιν τὸν Θεὸν τοῦ σῶσαι πάντας τοὺς πραεῖς τῆς γῆς. (διάψαλμα). |
| 10 | כִּֽי־חֲמַ֣ת אָדָ֣ם תּוֹדֶ֑ךָּ שְׁאֵרִ֖ית חֵמֹ֣ת תַּחְגֹּֽר׃ | Surely the wrath of man shall praise thee: the remainder of wrath shalt thou restrain. | ὅτι ἐνθύμιον ἀνθρώπου ἐξομολογήσεταί σοι, καὶ ἐγκατάλειμμα ἐνθυμίου ἑορτάσει σοι. |
| 11 | נִ֥דְר֣וּ וְשַׁלְּמוּ֮ לַיהֹוָ֢ה אֱֽלֹהֵ֫יכֶ֥ם כׇּל־סְבִיבָ֑יו יֹבִ֥ילוּ שַׁ֝֗י לַמּוֹרָֽא׃ | Vow, and pay unto the LORD your God: let all that be round about him bring presents unto him that ought to be feared. | εὔξασθε καὶ ἀπόδοτε Κυρίῳ τῷ Θεῷ ἡμῶν· πάντες οἱ κύκλῳ αὐτοῦ οἴσουσι δῶρα |
| 12 | יִ֭בְצֹר ר֣וּחַ נְגִידִ֑ים נ֝וֹרָ֗א לְמַלְכֵי־אָֽרֶץ׃ | He shall cut off the spirit of princes: he is terrible to the kings of the earth. | τῷ φοβερῷ καὶ ἀφαιρουμένῳ πνεύματα ἀρχόντων, φοβερῷ παρὰ τοῖς βασιλεῦσι τῆς γῆς. |
