= Psalm 55 =

Biblical psalm

- "Give ear to my prayer, O God"
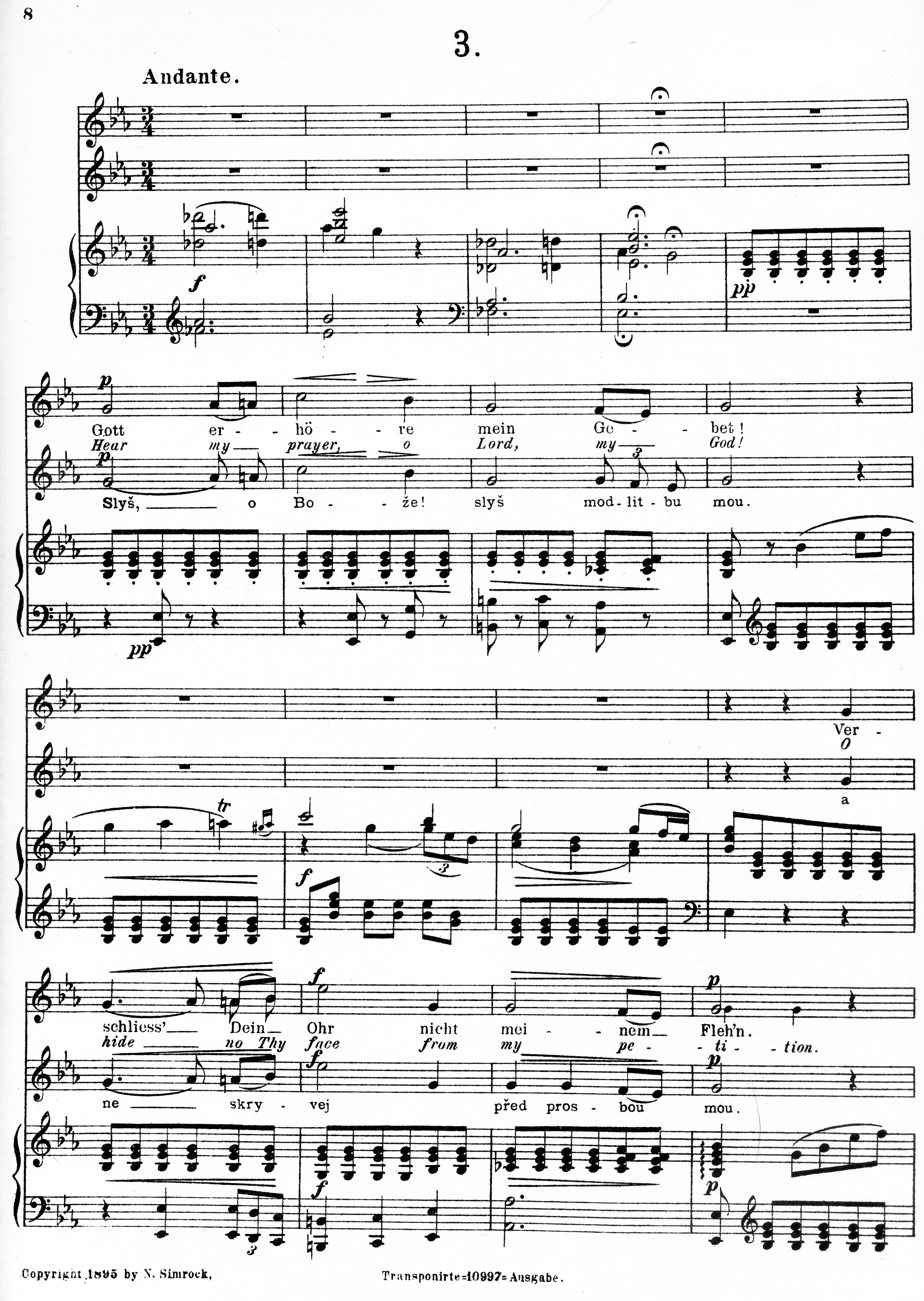
- Beginning of a setting by Dvořák in German and Czech
- Other name: Psalm 54 (Vulgate); "Exaudi Deus orationem meam"
- Language: Hebrew (original)

Psalm 55
- ← Psalm 54 Psalm 56 →
- Book: Book of Psalms
- Hebrew Bible part: Ketuvim
- Order in the Hebrew part: 1
- Category: Sifrei Emet
- Christian Bible part: Old Testament
- Order in the Christian part: 19

Psalm 55 is the 55th psalm of the Book of Psalms, beginning in English in the King James Version, "Give ear to my prayer, O God, and hide not thyself from my supplication". The Book of Psalms forms part of the ketuvim, the third section of the Hebrew Bible, and is part of the Christian Old Testament. In the slightly different numbering system of the Greek Septuagint version of the Bible, and in the Latin Vulgate, this psalm is Psalm 54. In Latin, it is known as "Exaudi Deus orationem meam". The psalm is a lament in which the author grieves because he is surrounded by enemies, and one of his closest friends has betrayed him.

The psalm forms a regular part of Jewish, Catholic, Lutheran, Anglican and other Protestant liturgies. Metrical hymns in English and German were derived from the psalm, and it has been set to music.

== Background ==
Psalm 55 is similar to Psalm 41, especially 41:9: "Even my close friend in whom I trusted, who ate my bread, has lifted his heel against me" (ESV).

The introduction to the psalm identifies it as a 'Maskil' (instructional piece) and associates it with David. The anonymous author may have been an Israelite living in a foreign city, and the false friend could be another Israelite living there. This interpretation may be considered especially plausible if the second part of verse 24 is translated "men of idols and figurines", as suggested by Hermann Gunkel and used in Mitchell Dahood's translation, rather than "men of blood and treachery".

Jerome, in the Vulgate, entitled this psalm Vox Christi adversus magnatos Judaeorum et Judam traditorem, meaning The voice of Christ against the chiefs of the Jews and the traitor Judas.

== Structure ==
The psalm can be divided into three sections, which Alexander Kirkpatrick in his 1901 commentary identified with the themes of despair, indignation, and trust:

1. The first section (vss. 1–8) begins with a desperate appeal to God for deliverance (vss. 1–3) and then launches into a description of the psalmist's anguish and his desire for peace.
2. Verses 9–15 are a strident denunciation of the author's enemies, especially an individual described as "my equal" and "my familiar friend" who has turned against the psalmist (vss. 12–14). This second section closes with a wish that the speaker's enemies be swallowed alive in Sheol, a possible allusion to the fate of Korah.
3. The final section (vss. 16–23) is a confident meditation on God's justice. The psalmist is sure that God will save him and destroy the wicked.

== Analysis ==
It is unclear whether the psalm was written by a single author or not. Some scholars suggest that verses 12–14, 20–21, and 22 are fragments by a different author which were inserted into the text of the original psalm.

In a 1999 article, Ulrike Bail used intertextual interpretive methods to read the psalm as a reference to the rape of Tamar.

== Uses ==
=== New Testament ===
Verse 22 is quoted in 1 Peter 5:7.

=== Judaism ===
- Verse 14 is found in Pirkei Avot Chapter 6, no. 3.
- Verse 19 is found in the prayers recited following Motzei Shabbat Maariv.
- Verse 24 is found in Pirkei Avot Chapter 5, no. 22.

=== Book of Common Prayer ===
In the Church of England's Book of Common Prayer, this psalm is appointed to be read on the evening of the tenth day of the month.

=== Musical settings ===
Heinrich Schütz set Psalm 55 in a metred version in German, "Erhör mein Gebet, du treuer Gott", SWV 152, as part of the Becker Psalter, first published in 1628. The text was set to music as Hear My Prayer by Felix Mendelssohn in 1844. Antonín Dvořák set verses 1–8 in Czech to music in his Biblical Songs (1894). Zoltán Kodály set Psalm 55 in Hungarian in 1923 with interpolations and extensions of grief and lamentation full of historic associations for the Hungarian people to the paraphrase by 16th-century poet Mihály Vég, as the Psalmus Hungaricus, Op. 13. Alan Hovhaness set portions of the text, along with portions of Psalms 54 and 56, in his choral work Make a Joyful Noise.

== Text ==
The following table shows the Hebrew text of the Psalm with vowels, alongside the Koine Greek text in the Septuagint and the English translation from the King James Version. Note that the meaning can slightly differ between these versions, as the Septuagint and the Masoretic Text come from different textual traditions. (Note: A 1917 translation directly from Hebrew to English by the Jewish Publication Society can be found here or here, and an 1844 translation directly from the Septuagint by L. C. L. Brenton can be found here. Both translations are in the public domain.) In the Septuagint, this psalm is numbered Psalm 54.

| # | Hebrew | English | Greek |
|---|---|---|---|
| (Note: In the Jewish verse numbering, the ascription of this psalm is verse 1, and the rest of the psalm begins from verse 2. However, the Christian verse numbering does not count the ascription.) | לַמְנַצֵּ֥חַ בִּנְגִינֹ֗ת מַשְׂכִּ֥יל לְדָוִֽד׃ | (To the chief Musician on Neginoth, Maschil, A Psalm of David.) | Εἰς τὸ τέλος, ἐν ὕμνοις· συνέσεως τῷ Δαυΐδ. - |
| 1 | הַאֲזִ֣ינָה אֱ֭לֹהִים תְּפִלָּתִ֑י וְאַל־תִּ֝תְעַלַּ֗ם מִתְּחִנָּתִֽי׃ | Give ear to my prayer, O God; and hide not thyself from my supplication. | ΕΝΩΤΙΣΑΙ, ὁ Θεός, τὴν προσευχήν μου καὶ μὴ ὑπερίδῃς τὴν δέησίν μου, |
| 2 | הַקְשִׁ֣יבָה לִּ֣י וַעֲנֵ֑נִי אָרִ֖יד בְּשִׂיחִ֣י וְאָהִֽימָה׃ | Attend unto me, and hear me: I mourn in my complaint, and make a noise; | πρόσχες μοι καὶ εἰσάκουσόν μου. ἐλυπήθην ἐν τῇ ἀδολεσχίᾳ μου καὶ ἐταράχθην |
| 3 | מִקּ֤וֹל אוֹיֵ֗ב מִ֭פְּנֵי עָקַ֣ת רָשָׁ֑ע כִּֽי־יָמִ֥יטוּ עָלַ֥י אָ֝֗וֶן וּבְאַ֥ף יִשְׂטְמֽוּנִי׃ | Because of the voice of the enemy, because of the oppression of the wicked: for they cast iniquity upon me, and in wrath they hate me. | ἀπὸ φωνῆς ἐχθροῦ καὶ ἀπὸ θλίψεως ἁμαρτωλοῦ, ὅτι ἐξέκλιναν ἐπ᾿ ἐμὲ ἀνομίαν καὶ ἐν ὀργῇ ἐνεκότουν μοι. |
| 4 | לִ֭בִּי יָחִ֣יל בְּקִרְבִּ֑י וְאֵימ֥וֹת מָ֝֗וֶת נָפְל֥וּ עָלָֽי׃ | My heart is sore pained within me: and the terrors of death are fallen upon me. | ἡ καρδία μου ἐταράχθη ἐν ἐμοί, καὶ δειλία θανάτου ἐπέπεσεν ἐπ᾿ ἐμέ· |
| 5 | יִרְאָ֣ה וָ֭רַעַד יָ֣בֹא בִ֑י וַ֝תְּכַסֵּ֗נִי פַּלָּצֽוּת׃ | Fearfulness and trembling are come upon me, and horror hath overwhelmed me. | φόβος καὶ τρόμος ἦλθεν ἐπ᾿ ἐμέ, καὶ ἐκάλυψέ με σκότος. |
| 6 | וָאֹמַ֗ר מִֽי־יִתֶּן־לִ֣י אֵ֭בֶר כַּיּוֹנָ֗ה אָע֥וּפָה וְאֶשְׁכֹּֽנָה׃ | And I said, Oh that I had wings like a dove! for then would I fly away, and be at rest. | καὶ εἶπα· τίς δώσει μοι πτέρυγας ὡσεὶ περιστερᾶς καὶ πετασθήσομαι καὶ καταπαύσω; |
| 7 | הִ֭נֵּה אַרְחִ֣יק נְדֹ֑ד אָלִ֖ין בַּמִּדְבָּ֣ר סֶֽלָה׃ | Lo, then would I wander far off, and remain in the wilderness. Selah. | ἰδοὺ ἐμάκρυνα φυγαδεύων καὶ ηὐλίσθην ἐν τῇ ἐρήμῳ. (διάψαλμα). |
| 8 | אָחִ֣ישָׁה מִפְלָ֣ט לִ֑י מֵר֖וּחַ סֹעָ֣ה מִסָּֽעַר׃ | I would hasten my escape from the windy storm and tempest. | προσεδεχόμην τὸν σῴζοντά με, ἀπὸ ὀλιγοψυχίας καὶ ἀπὸ καταιγίδος. |
| 9 | בַּלַּ֣ע אֲ֭דֹנָי פַּלַּ֣ג לְשׁוֹנָ֑ם כִּֽי־רָאִ֨יתִי חָמָ֖ס וְרִ֣יב בָּעִֽיר׃ | Destroy, O Lord, and divide their tongues: for I have seen violence and strife in the city. | καταπόντισον, Κύριε, καὶ καταδίελε τὰς γλώσσας αὐτῶν, ὅτι εἶδον ἀνομίαν καὶ ἀντιλογίαν ἐν τῇ πόλει. |
| 10 | יוֹמָ֤ם וָלַ֗יְלָה יְסוֹבְבֻ֥הָ עַל־חוֹמֹתֶ֑יהָ וְאָ֖וֶן וְעָמָ֣ל בְּקִרְבָּֽהּ׃ | Day and night they go about it upon the walls thereof: mischief also and sorrow are in the midst of it. | ἡμέρας καὶ νυκτὸς κυκλώσει αὐτὴν ἐπὶ τὰ τείχη αὐτῆς, καὶ ἀνομία καὶ κόπος ἐν μέσῳ αὐτῆς |
| 11 | הַוּ֥וֹת בְּקִרְבָּ֑הּ וְֽלֹא־יָמִ֥ישׁ מֵ֝רְחֹבָ֗הּ תֹּ֣ךְ וּמִרְמָֽה׃ | Wickedness is in the midst thereof: deceit and guile depart not from her streets. | καὶ ἀδικία, καὶ οὐκ ἐξέλιπεν ἐκ τῶν πλατειῶν αὐτῆς τόκος καὶ δόλος. |
| 12 | כִּ֤י לֹֽא־אוֹיֵ֥ב יְחָֽרְפֵ֗נִי וְאֶ֫שָּׂ֥א לֹא־מְ֭שַׂנְאִי עָלַ֣י הִגְדִּ֑יל וְאֶסָּתֵ֥ר מִמֶּֽנּוּ׃ | For it was not an enemy that reproached me; then I could have borne it: neither was it he that hated me that did magnify himself against me; then I would have hid myself from him: | ὅτι εἰ ἐχθρὸς ὠνείδισέ με, ὑπήνεγκα ἄν, καὶ εἰ ὁ μισῶν ἐπ᾿ ἐμὲ ἐμεγαλορρημόνησεν, ἐκρύβην ἂν ἀπ᾿ αὐτοῦ. |
| 13 | וְאַתָּ֣ה אֱנ֣וֹשׁ כְּעֶרְכִּ֑י אַ֝לּוּפִ֗י וּמְיֻדָּעִֽי׃ | But it was thou, a man mine equal, my guide, and mine acquaintance. | σὺ δέ, ἄνθρωπε ἰσόψυχε, ἡγεμών μου καὶ γνωστέ μου, |
| 14 | אֲשֶׁ֣ר יַ֭חְדָּו נַמְתִּ֣יק ס֑וֹד בְּבֵ֥ית אֱ֝לֹהִ֗ים נְהַלֵּ֥ךְ בְּרָֽגֶשׁ׃ | We took sweet counsel together, and walked unto the house of God in company. | ὃς ἐπὶ τὸ αὐτὸ ἐγλύκανάς μοι ἐδέσματα, ἐν τῷ οἴκῳ τοῦ Θεοῦ ἐπορεύθην ἐν ὁμονοίᾳ. |
| 15 | (ישימות) [יַשִּׁ֤י מָ֨וֶת ׀] עָלֵ֗ימוֹ יֵרְד֣וּ שְׁא֣וֹל חַיִּ֑ים כִּֽי־רָע֖וֹת בִּמְגוּרָ֣ם בְּקִרְבָּֽם׃ | Let death seize upon them, and let them go down quick into hell: for wickedness is in their dwellings, and among them. | ἐλθέτω δὴ θάνατος ἐπ᾿ αὐτούς, καὶ καταβήτωσαν εἰς ᾅδου ζῶντες· ὅτι πονηρία ἐν ταῖς παροικίαις αὐτῶν ἐν μέσῳ αὐτῶν. |
| 16 | אֲ֭נִי אֶל־אֱלֹהִ֣ים אֶקְרָ֑א וַ֝יהֹוָ֗ה יוֹשִׁיעֵֽנִי׃ | As for me, I will call upon God; and the LORD shall save me. | ἐγὼ πρὸς τὸν Θεὸν ἐκέκραξα, καὶ ὁ Κύριος εἰσήκουσέ μου. |
| 17 | עֶ֤רֶב וָבֹ֣קֶר וְ֭צׇהֳרַיִם אָשִׂ֣יחָה וְאֶֽהֱמֶ֑ה וַיִּשְׁמַ֥ע קוֹלִֽי׃ | Evening, and morning, and at noon, will I pray, and cry aloud: and he shall hear my voice. | ἑσπέρας καὶ πρωΐ καὶ μεσημβρίας διηγήσομαι καὶ ἀπαγγελῶ, καὶ εἰσακούσεται τῆς φωνῆς μου. |
| 18 | פָּ֘דָ֤ה בְשָׁל֣וֹם נַ֭פְשִׁי מִקְּרׇב־לִ֑י כִּֽי־בְ֝רַבִּ֗ים הָי֥וּ עִמָּדִֽי׃ | He hath delivered my soul in peace from the battle that was against me: for there were many with me. | λυτρώσεται ἐν εἰρήνῃ τὴν ψυχήν μου ἀπὸ τῶν ἐγγιζόντων μοι, ὅτι ἐν πολλοῖς ἦσαν σὺν ἐμοί. |
| 19 | יִשְׁמַ֤ע ׀ אֵ֨ל ׀ וְֽיַעֲנֵם֮ וְיֹ֤שֵׁ֥ב קֶ֗דֶם סֶ֥֫לָה אֲשֶׁ֤ר אֵ֣ין חֲלִיפ֣וֹת לָ֑מוֹ וְלֹ֖א יָרְא֣וּ אֱלֹהִֽים׃ | God shall hear, and afflict them, even he that abideth of old. Selah. Because they have no changes, therefore they fear not God. | εἰσακούσεται ὁ Θεὸς καὶ ταπεινώσει αὐτοὺς ὁ ὑπάρχων πρὸ τῶν αἰώνων. (διάψαλμα). οὐ γάρ ἐστιν αὐτοῖς ἀντάλλαγμα, ὅτι οὐκ ἐφοβήθησαν τὸν Θεόν. |
| 20 | שָׁלַ֣ח יָ֭דָיו בִּשְׁלֹמָ֗יו חִלֵּ֥ל בְּרִיתֽוֹ׃ | He hath put forth his hands against such as be at peace with him: he hath broken his covenant. | ἐξέτεινε τὴν χεῖρα αὐτοῦ ἐν τῷ ἀποδιδόναι· ἐβεβήλωσαν τὴν διαθήκην αὐτοῦ. |
| 21 | חָלְק֤וּ ׀ מַחְמָאֹ֣ת פִּיו֮ וּֽקְרָב־לִ֫בּ֥וֹ רַכּ֖וּ דְבָרָ֥יו מִשֶּׁ֗מֶן וְהֵ֣מָּה פְתִחֽוֹת׃ | The words of his mouth were smoother than butter, but war was in his heart: his words were softer than oil, yet were they drawn swords. | διεμερίσθησαν ἀπὸ ὀργῆς τοῦ προσώπου αὐτοῦ, καὶ ἤγγισαν αἱ καρδίαι αὐτῶν· ἡπαλύνθησαν οἱ λόγοι αὐτοῦ ὑπὲρ ἔλαιον, καὶ αὐτοί εἰσι βολίδες. |
| 22 | הַשְׁלֵ֤ךְ עַל־יְהֹוָ֨ה ׀ יְהָבְךָ֮ וְה֢וּא יְכַ֫לְכְּלֶ֥ךָ לֹא־יִתֵּ֖ן לְעוֹלָ֥ם מ֗וֹט לַצַּדִּֽיק׃ | Cast thy burden upon the LORD, and he shall sustain thee: he shall never suffer the righteous to be moved. | ἐπίρριψον ἐπὶ Κύριον τὴν μέριμνάν σου, καὶ αὐτός σε διαθρέψει· οὐ δώσει εἰς τὸν αἰῶνα σάλον τῷ δικαίῳ. |
| 23 | וְאַתָּ֤ה אֱלֹהִ֨ים ׀ תּוֹרִדֵ֬ם ׀ לִבְאֵ֬ר שַׁ֗חַת אַנְשֵׁ֤י דָמִ֣ים וּ֭מִרְמָה לֹא־יֶחֱצ֣וּ יְמֵיהֶ֑ם וַ֝אֲנִ֗י אֶבְטַח־בָּֽךְ׃ | But thou, O God, shalt bring them down into the pit of destruction: bloody and deceitful men shall not live out half their days; but I will trust in thee. | σὺ δέ, ὁ Θεός, κατάξεις αὐτοὺς εἰς φρέαρ διαφθορᾶς· ἄνδρες αἱμάτων καὶ δολιότητος οὐ μὴ ἡμισεύσωσι τὰς ἡμέρας αὐτῶν, ἐγὼ δέ, Κύριε, ἐλπιῶ ἐπὶ σέ. |

== Bibliography ==
- Bail, Ulrike (1999). "The Breath After the Comma, Psalm 55 and Violence Against Women". Journal of Religion and Abuse. 1 (3): 5–18. doi:10.1300/J154v01n03_02.
- Dahood, Mitchell (1966). Psalms I: 1–50. Anchor Bible Series. Garden City, New York: Doubleday & Company. ISBN 9780385027656.
- Human, D. J. (1997). "A tradition-historical analysis of Psalm 55" (PDF). Verbum et Ecclesia. 18 (2): 267–279. doi:10.4102/ve.v18i2.562. hdl:2263/15581. ISSN 2074-7705.
- Kirkpatrick, A. F. (1901). The Book of Psalms. The Cambridge Bible for Schools and Colleges. Cambridge University Press.
- Limburg, James (2000). Psalms. Westminster John Knox Press. ISBN 978-0-664-25557-2.
- Kraus, Hans-Joachim (1993). Psalms 1–59: A Continental Commentary. Fortress Press. ISBN 978-1-4514-0936-9.
- Rhodes, Arnold B. (1960). The Book of Psalms. The Layman's Bible Commentary. Richmond, Virginia: John Knox Press. ISBN 9780804230094.
- Scherman, Nosson; Zlotowitz, Meir (1986). Siddur: The Complete ArtScroll Siddur – Ashkenaz. Mesorah Publications. ISBN 978-0-89906-661-5.
