= Psalm 59 =

Biblical psalm

- "Deliver me from mine enemies, O my God"
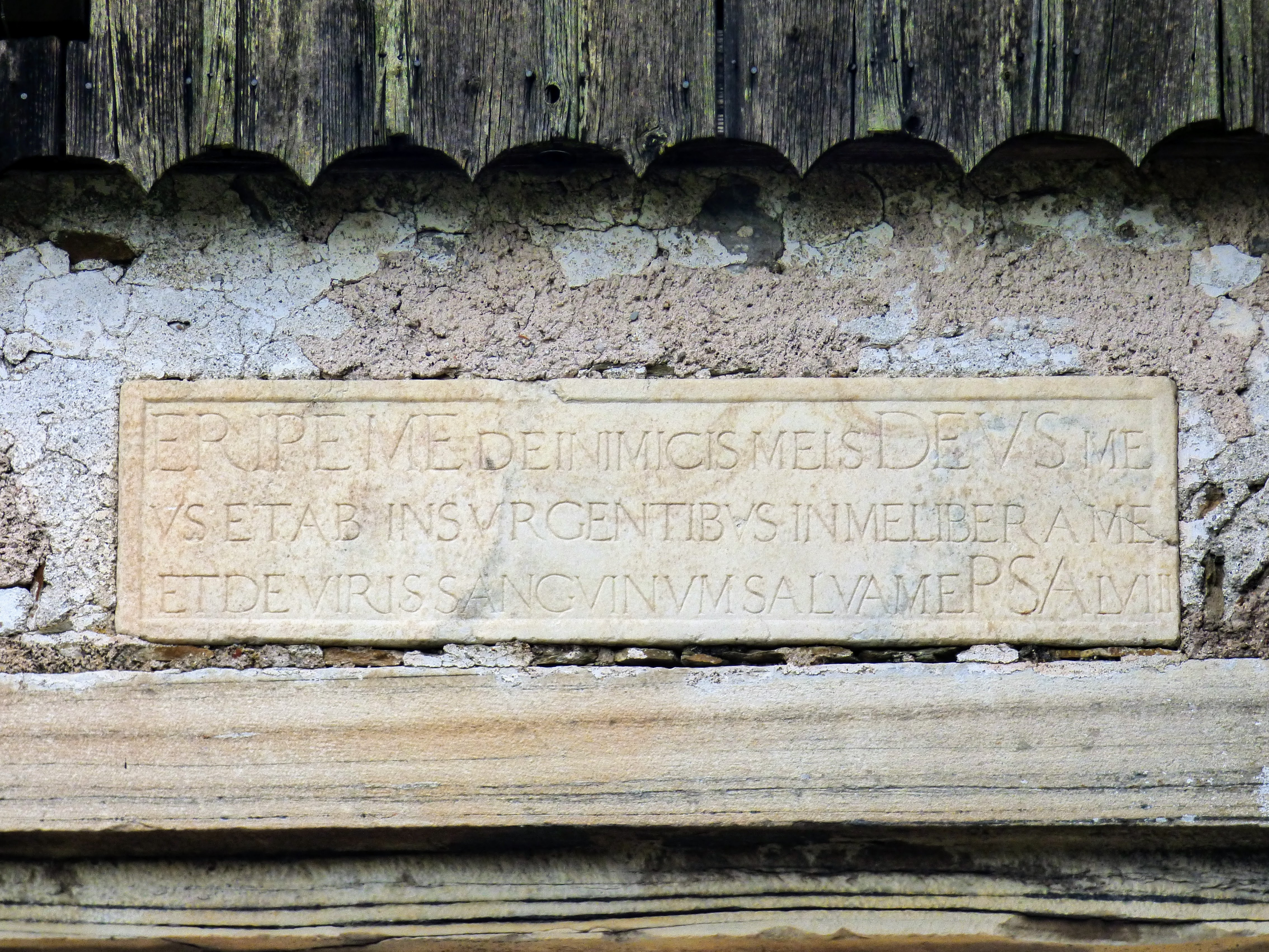
- Inscription of a line from the psalm at a bridge in Hochosterwitz
- Other name: Psalm 58; "Eripe me de inimicis meis Deu"
- Language: Hebrew (original)

Psalm 59
- ← Psalm 58 Psalm 60 →
- Book: Book of Psalms
- Hebrew Bible part: Ketuvim
- Order in the Hebrew part: 1
- Category: Sifrei Emet
- Christian Bible part: Old Testament
- Order in the Christian part: 19

Psalm 59 is the 59th psalm of the Book of Psalms, beginning in the English King James Version: "Deliver me from mine enemies, O my God". In the slightly different numbering system of the Greek Septuagint version of the Bible and the Latin Vulgate, this psalm is Psalm 58. In Latin, it is known as "Eripe me de inimicis meis Deu". It is described as "a prayer composed when Saul sent messengers to wait at the house in order to kill him", and commentator Cyril Rodd describes it as a "vigorous plea for the destruction of the psalmist's enemies".

The psalm forms a regular part of Jewish, Catholic, Lutheran, Anglican and other Protestant liturgies. It has been set to music.

== Uses ==
=== Judaism ===
Psalm 59 is one of the ten Psalms of the Tikkun HaKlali of Rebbe Nachman of Breslov.

Verse 18 (verse 17 in English translations) is found in the repetition of the Amidah during Rosh Hashanah.

=== Book of Common Prayer ===
In the Church of England's Book of Common Prayer, this psalm is scheduled to be read on the evening of the 11th day of the month.

== Musical settings ==
Heinrich Schütz set Psalm 59 in a metred version in German, "Hilf, Herre Gott, errette mich", SWV 156, as part of the Becker Psalter, first published in 1628.

== Text ==
The following table shows the Hebrew text of the Psalm with vowels, alongside the Koine Greek text in the Septuagint and the English translation from the King James Version. Note that the meaning can slightly differ between these versions, as the Septuagint and the Masoretic Text come from different textual traditions. (Note: A 1917 translation directly from Hebrew to English by the Jewish Publication Society can be found here or here, and an 1844 translation directly from the Septuagint by L. C. L. Brenton can be found here. Both translations are in the public domain.) In the Septuagint, this psalm is numbered Psalm 58.

#	Hebrew	English	Greek
(Note: In the Jewish verse numbering, the ascription of this psalm is verse 1, and the rest of the psalm begins from verse 2. However, the Christian verse numbering does not count the ascription.)	לַמְנַצֵּ֣חַ אַל־תַּשְׁחֵת֮ לְדָוִ֢ד מִ֫כְתָּ֥ם בִּשְׁלֹ֥חַ שָׁא֑וּל וַֽיִּשְׁמְר֥וּ אֶת־הַ֝בַּ֗יִת לַהֲמִיתֽוֹ׃	(To the chief Musician, Altaschith, Michtam of David; when Saul sent, and they watched the house to kill him.) (Note: This text, connected with an incident recorded in 1 Samuel 19:11–17, may be an editorial addition. "Altaschith", or "Do Not Destroy", may refer to an ancient song whose tune was to be used in singing the psalms.)	Εἰς τὸ τέλος· μὴ διαφθείρῃς· τῷ Δαυΐδ εἰς στηλογραφίαν, ὁπότε ἀπέστειλε Σαοὺλ καὶ ἐφύλαξε τὸν οἶκον αὐτοῦ τοῦ θανατῶσαι αὐτόν. -
1	הַצִּילֵ֖נִי מֵאֹיְבַ֥י ׀ אֱלֹהָ֑י מִֽמִּתְקוֹמְמַ֥י תְּשַׂגְּבֵֽנִי׃	Deliver me from mine enemies, O my God: defend me from them that rise up against me.	ΕΞΕΛΟΥ με ἐκ τῶν ἐχθρῶν μου, ὁ Θεός, καὶ ἐκ τῶν ἐπανισταμένων ἐπ᾿ ἐμὲ λύτρωσαί με·
2	הַ֭צִּילֵנִי מִפֹּ֣עֲלֵי אָ֑וֶן וּֽמֵאַנְשֵׁ֥י דָ֝מִ֗ים הֽוֹשִׁיעֵֽנִי׃	Deliver me from the workers of iniquity, and save me from bloody men.	ῥῦσαί με ἐκ τῶν ἐργαζομένων τὴν ἀνομίαν καὶ ἐξ ἀνδρῶν αἱμάτων σῶσόν με.
3	כִּ֤י הִנֵּ֪ה אָרְב֡וּ לְנַפְשִׁ֗י יָג֣וּרוּ עָלַ֣י עַזִּ֑ים לֹֽא־פִשְׁעִ֖י וְלֹא־חַטָּאתִ֣י יְהֹוָֽה׃	For, lo, they lie in wait for my soul: the mighty are gathered against me; not for my transgression, nor for my sin, O LORD.	ὅτι ἰδοὺ ἐθήρευσαν τὴν ψυχήν μου, ἐπέθεντο ἐπ᾿ ἐμὲ κραταιοί. οὔτε ἡ ἀνομία μου οὔτε ἡ ἁμαρτία μου, Κύριε·
4	בְּֽלִי־עָ֭וֺן יְרֻצ֣וּן וְיִכּוֹנָ֑נוּ ע֖וּרָה לִקְרָאתִ֣י וּרְאֵֽה׃	They run and prepare themselves without my fault: awake to help me, and behold.	ἄνευ ἀνομίας ἔδραμον καὶ κατεύθυνα· ἐξεγέρθητι εἰς συνάντησίν μου καὶ ἴδε.
5	וְאַתָּ֤ה יְהֹוָֽה־אֱלֹהִ֥ים ׀ צְבָא֡וֹת אֱלֹ֘הֵ֤י יִשְׂרָאֵ֗ל הָקִ֗יצָה לִפְקֹ֥ד כׇּֽל־הַגּוֹיִ֑ם אַל־תָּחֹ֨ן כׇּל־בֹּ֖גְדֵי אָ֣וֶן סֶֽלָה׃	Thou therefore, O LORD God of hosts, the God of Israel, awake to visit all the heathen: be not merciful to any wicked transgressors. Selah.	καὶ σύ, Κύριε, ὁ Θεὸς τῶν δυνάμεων, ὁ Θεὸς τοῦ ᾿Ισραήλ, πρόσχες τοῦ ἐπισκέψασθαι πάντα τὰ ἔθνη, μὴ οἰκτειρήσῃς πάντας τοὺς ἐργαζομένους τὴν ἀνομίαν. (διάψαλμα).
6	יָשׁ֣וּבוּ לָ֭עֶרֶב יֶהֱמ֥וּ כַכָּ֗לֶב וִיס֥וֹבְבוּ עִֽיר׃	They return at evening: they make a noise like a dog, and go round about the city.	ἐπιστρέψουσιν εἰς ἑσπέραν καὶ λιμώξουσιν ὡς κύων καὶ κυκλώσουσι πόλιν.
7	הִנֵּ֤ה ׀ יַבִּ֘יע֤וּן בְּפִיהֶ֗ם חֲ֭רָבוֹת בְּשִׂפְתֽוֹתֵיהֶ֑ם כִּי־מִ֥י שֹׁמֵֽעַ׃	Behold, they belch out with their mouth: swords are in their lips: for who, say they, doth hear?	ἰδοὺ ἀποφθέγξονται ἐν τῷ στόματι αὐτῶν, καὶ ρομφαία ἐν τοῖς χείλεσιν αὐτῶν, ὅτι τίς ἤκουσε;
8	וְאַתָּ֣ה יְ֭הֹוָה תִּשְׂחַק־לָ֑מוֹ תִּ֝לְעַ֗ג לְכׇל־גּוֹיִֽם׃	But thou, O LORD, shalt laugh at them; thou shalt have all the heathen in derision.	καὶ σύ, Κύριε, ἐκγελάσῃ αὐτούς, ἐξουδενώσεις πάντα τὰ ἔθνη.
9	עֻ֭זּוֹ אֵלֶ֣יךָ אֶשְׁמֹ֑רָה כִּֽי־אֱ֝לֹהִ֗ים מִשְׂגַּבִּֽי׃	Because of his strength will I wait upon thee: for God is my defence.	τὸ κράτος μου, πρὸς σὲ φυλάξω, ὅτι σύ, ὁ Θεός, ἀντιλήπτωρ μου εἶ.
10	אֱלֹהֵ֣י (חסדו) [חַסְדִּ֣י] יְקַדְּמֵ֑נִי אֱ֝לֹהִ֗ים יַרְאֵ֥נִי בְשֹׁרְרָֽי׃	The God of my mercy shall prevent me: God shall let me see my desire upon mine enemies.	ὁ Θεός μου, τὸ ἔλεος αὐτοῦ προφθάσει με· ὁ Θεός μου δείξει μοι ἐν τοῖς ἐχθροῖς μου.
11	אַל־תַּהַרְגֵ֤ם ׀ פֶּֽן־יִשְׁכְּח֬וּ עַמִּ֗י הֲנִיעֵ֣מוֹ בְ֭חֵילְךָ וְהוֹרִידֵ֑מוֹ מָגִנֵּ֣נוּ אֲדֹנָֽי׃	Slay them not, lest my people forget: scatter them by thy power; and bring them down, O Lord our shield.	μὴ ἀποκτείνῃς αὐτούς, μήποτε ἐπιλάθωνται τοῦ νόμου σου· διασκόρπισον αὐτοὺς ἐν τῇ δυνάμει σου καὶ κατάγαγε αὐτούς, ὁ ὑπερασπιστής μου, Κύριε.
12	חַטַּאת־פִּ֗ימוֹ דְּֽבַר־שְׂפָ֫תֵ֥ימוֹ וְיִלָּכְד֥וּ בִגְאוֹנָ֑ם וּמֵאָלָ֖ה וּמִכַּ֣חַשׁ יְסַפֵּֽרוּ׃	For the sin of their mouth and the words of their lips let them even be taken in their pride: and for cursing and lying which they speak.	ἁμαρτία στόματος αὐτῶν, λόγος χειλέων αὐτῶν, καὶ συλληφθήτωσαν ἐν τῇ ὑπερηφανίᾳ αὐτῶν· καὶ ἐξ ἀρᾶς καὶ ψεύδους διαγγελήσονται ἐν συντελείᾳ,
13	כַּלֵּ֥ה בְחֵמָה֮ כַּלֵּ֢ה וְֽאֵ֫ינֵ֥מוֹ וְֽיֵדְע֗וּ כִּֽי־אֱ֭לֹהִים מֹשֵׁ֣ל בְּֽיַעֲקֹ֑ב לְאַפְסֵ֖י הָאָ֣רֶץ סֶֽלָה׃	Consume them in wrath, consume them, that they may not be: and let them know that God ruleth in Jacob unto the ends of the earth. Selah.	ἐν ὀργῇ συντελείας, καὶ οὐ μὴ ὑπάρξουσι· καὶ γνώσονται, ὅτι Θεὸς δεσπόζει τοῦ ᾿Ιακὼβ τῶν περάτων τῆς γῆς. (διάψαλμα).
14	וְיָשֻׁ֣בוּ לָ֭עֶרֶב יֶהֱמ֥וּ כַכָּ֗לֶב וִיס֥וֹבְבוּ עִֽיר׃	And at evening let them return; and let them make a noise like a dog, and go round about the city.	ἐπιστρέψουσιν εἰς ἑσπέραν, καὶ λιμώξουσιν ὡς κύων καὶ κυκλώσουσι πόλιν.
15	הֵ֭מָּה (ינועון) [יְנִיע֣וּן] לֶאֱכֹ֑ל אִם־לֹ֥א יִ֝שְׂבְּע֗וּ וַיָּלִֽינוּ׃	Let them wander up and down for meat, and grudge if they be not satisfied.	αὐτοὶ διασκορπισθήσονται τοῦ φαγεῖν· ἐὰν δὲ μὴ χορτασθῶσι, καὶ γογγύσουσιν.
16	וַאֲנִ֤י ׀ אָשִׁ֣יר עֻזֶּךָ֮ וַאֲרַנֵּ֥ן לַבֹּ֗קֶר חַ֫סְדֶּ֥ךָ כִּֽי־הָיִ֣יתָ מִשְׂגָּ֣ב לִ֑י וּ֝מָנ֗וֹס בְּי֣וֹם צַר־לִֽי׃	But I will sing of thy power; yea, I will sing aloud of thy mercy in the morning: for thou hast been my defence and refuge in the day of my trouble.	ἐγὼ δὲ ᾄσομαι τῇ δυνάμει σου καὶ ἀγαλλιάσομαι τὸ πρωΐ τὸ ἔλεός σου, ὅτι ἐγενήθης ἀντιλήπτωρ μου καὶ καταφυγή μου ἐν ἡμέρᾳ θλίψεώς μου.
17	עֻ֭זִּי אֵלֶ֣יךָ אֲזַמֵּ֑רָה כִּֽי־אֱלֹהִ֥ים מִ֝שְׂגַּבִּ֗י אֱלֹהֵ֥י חַסְדִּֽי׃	Unto thee, O my strength, will I sing: for God is my defence, and the God of my mercy.	βοηθός μου εἶ, σοὶ ψαλῶ, ὅτι σύ, ὁ Θεός, ἀντιλήπτωρ μου εἶ, ὁ Θεός μου, τὸ ἔλεός μου.
