= Psalm 56 =

Biblical psalm

- "Be merciful unto me, O God: for man would swallow me up"
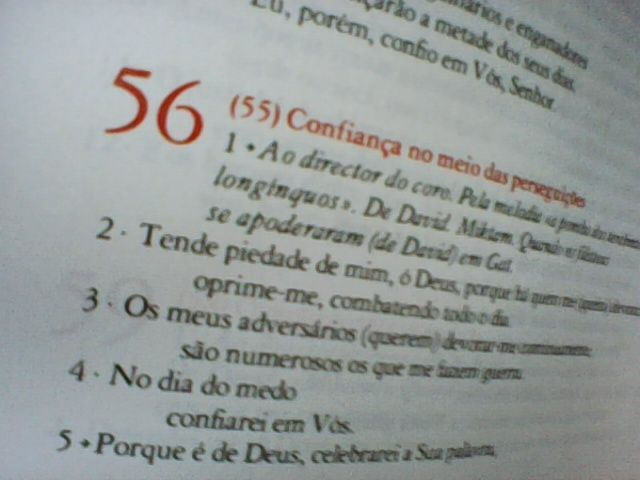
- Psalm 56 in a Portuguese Bible
- Other name: Psalm 55; "Miserere mei Deus quoniam conculcavit me homo"
- Language: Hebrew (original)

Psalm 56
- ← Psalm 55 Psalm 57 →
- Book: Book of Psalms
- Hebrew Bible part: Ketuvim
- Order in the Hebrew part: 1
- Category: Sifrei Emet
- Christian Bible part: Old Testament
- Order in the Christian part: 19

Psalm 56 is the 56th psalm of the Book of Psalms, beginning in English in the King James Version: "Be merciful unto me, O God: for man would swallow me up". In the slightly different numbering system of the Greek Septuagint version of the Bible and the Latin Vulgate, this psalm is Psalm 55. In Latin, it is known as "Miserere mei Deus quoniam conculcavit me homo". The psalm is the first of a series of five psalms in this part of the book which are referred to as Miktams. It is attributed to King David and may be considered representative of him or anyone else hiding from an enemy.

The psalm forms a regular part of Jewish, Catholic, Lutheran, Anglican and other Protestant liturgies. It has been set to music.

== Commentary ==
The historical setting of this Psalm, as given in its title, is David's flight to Gath, which is recorded in 1 Samuel 21:10–15. It is a prayer for help against enemies, ascribed to royal rites, as indicated by the interpretation of the 'peoples' in verse 7 as foreign enemies, the references to national war in verses 1–2, 9, as well as the vows and thank-offerings (verse 12) which are particularly suitable for a king, and the references to 'death' and the 'light of life' (verse 13) are also linked to royal imagery.

== Book of Common Prayer ==
In the Church of England's Book of Common Prayer, this psalm is appointed to be read on the morning of the 11th day of the month.

== Musical settings ==
Heinrich Schütz wrote a setting of a paraphrase of Psalm 40 in German, "Herr Gott, erzeig mir Hülf und Gnad", SWV 153, for the Becker Psalter, published first in 1628. Mendelssohn used a verse in German for the text of the third movement from his Lobgesang. Alan Hovhaness set text from this Psalm, as well as Psalms 54 and 55, in his 1966 work Make a Joyful Noise.

== Text ==
The following table shows the Hebrew text of the Psalm with vowels, alongside the Koine Greek text in the Septuagint and the English translation from the King James Version. Note that the meaning can slightly differ between these versions, as the Septuagint and the Masoretic Text come from different textual traditions. (Note: A 1917 translation directly from Hebrew to English by the Jewish Publication Society can be found here or here, and an 1844 translation directly from the Septuagint by L. C. L. Brenton can be found here. Both translations are in the public domain.) In the Septuagint, this psalm is numbered Psalm 55.

#	Hebrew	English	Greek
(Note: In the Jewish verse numbering, the ascription of this psalm is verse 1, and the rest of the psalm begins from verse 2. However, the Christian verse numbering does not count the ascription.)	לַמְנַצֵּ֤חַ ׀ עַל־י֬וֹנַת אֵ֣לֶם רְ֭חֹקִים לְדָוִ֣ד מִכְתָּ֑ם בֶּאֱחֹ֨ז אוֹת֖וֹ פְלִשְׁתִּ֣ים בְּגַֽת׃	(To the chief Musician upon Jonathelemrechokim, Michtam of David, when the Philistines took him in Gath.)	Εἰς τὸ τέλος, ὑπὲρ τοῦ λαοῦ τοῦ ἀπὸ τῶν ἁγίων μεμακρυμμένου· τῷ Δαυΐδ εἰς στηλογραφίαν, ὁπότε ἐκράτησαν αὐτὸν οἱ ἀλλόφυλοι ἐν Γέθ. -
1	חׇנֵּ֣נִי אֱ֭לֹהִים כִּֽי־שְׁאָפַ֣נִי אֱנ֑וֹשׁ כׇּל־הַ֝יּ֗וֹם לֹחֵ֥ם יִלְחָצֵֽנִי׃	Be merciful unto me, O God: for man would swallow me up; he fighting daily oppresseth me.	ΕΛΕΗΣΟΝ με, ὁ Θεός, ὅτι κατεπάτησέ με ἄνθρωπος, ὅλην τὴν ἡμέραν πολεμῶν ἔθλιψέ με.
2	שָׁאֲפ֣וּ שׁ֭וֹרְרַי כׇּל־הַיּ֑וֹם כִּֽי־רַבִּ֨ים לֹחֲמִ֖ים לִ֣י מָרֽוֹם׃	Mine enemies would daily swallow me up: for they be many that fight against me, O thou most High.	κατεπάτησάν με οἱ ἐχθροί μου ὅλην τὴν ἡμέραν, ὅτι πολλοὶ οἱ πολεμοῦντες με ἀπὸ ὕψους.
3	י֥וֹם אִירָ֑א אֲ֝נִ֗י אֵלֶ֥יךָ אֶבְטָֽח׃	What time I am afraid, I will trust in thee.	ἡμέρας οὐ φοβηθήσομαι, ἐγὼ δὲ ἐλπιῶ ἐπὶ σέ.
4	בֵּאלֹהִים֮ אֲהַלֵּ֢ל דְּבָ֫ר֥וֹ בֵּאלֹהִ֣ים בָּ֭טַחְתִּי לֹ֣א אִירָ֑א מַה־יַּעֲשֶׂ֖ה בָשָׂ֣ר לִֽי׃	In God I will praise his word, in God I have put my trust; I will not fear what flesh can do unto me.	ἐν τῷ Θεῷ ἐπαινέσω τοὺς λόγους μου, ἐπὶ τῷ Θεῷ ἤλπισα, οὐ φοβηθήσομαι τί ποιήσει μοι σάρξ.
5	כׇּל־הַ֭יּוֹם דְּבָרַ֣י יְעַצֵּ֑בוּ עָלַ֖י כׇּל־מַחְשְׁבֹתָ֣ם לָרָֽע׃	Every day they wrest my words: all their thoughts are against me for evil.	ὅλην τὴν ἡμέραν τοὺς λόγους μου ἐβδελύσσοντο, κατ᾿ ἐμοῦ πάντες οἱ διαλογισμοὶ αὐτῶν εἰς κακόν.
6	יָג֤וּרוּ ׀ (יצפינו) [יִצְפּ֗וֹנוּ] הֵ֭מָּה עֲקֵבַ֣י יִשְׁמֹ֑רוּ כַּ֝אֲשֶׁ֗ר קִוּ֥וּ נַפְשִֽׁי׃	They gather themselves together, they hide themselves, they mark my steps, when they wait for my soul.	παροικήσουσι καὶ κατακρύψουσιν· αὐτοὶ τὴν πτέρναν μου φυλάξουσι, καθάπερ ὑπέμειναν τῇ ψυχῇ μου.
7	עַל־אָ֥וֶן פַּלֶּט־לָ֑מוֹ בְּ֝אַ֗ף עַמִּ֤ים ׀ הוֹרֵ֬ד אֱלֹהִֽים׃	Shall they escape by iniquity? in thine anger cast down the people, O God.	ὑπὲρ τοῦ μηθενὸς σώσεις αὐτούς, ἐν ὀργῇ λαοὺς κατάξεις. ὁ Θεός,
8	נֹדִי֮ סָפַ֢רְתָּ֫ה אָ֥תָּה שִׂ֣ימָה דִמְעָתִ֣י בְנֹאדֶ֑ךָ הֲ֝לֹ֗א בְּסִפְרָתֶֽךָ׃	Thou tellest my wanderings: put thou my tears into thy bottle: are they not in thy book?	τὴν ζωήν μου ἐξήγγειλά σοι, ἔθου τὰ δάκρυά μου ἐνώπιόν σου ὡς καὶ ἐν τῇ ἐπαγγελίᾳ σου.
9	אָ֨ז יָ֘שׁ֤וּבוּ אוֹיְבַ֣י אָ֭חוֹר בְּי֣וֹם אֶקְרָ֑א זֶה־יָ֝דַ֗עְתִּי כִּֽי־אֱלֹהִ֥ים לִֽי׃	When I cry unto thee, then shall mine enemies turn back: this I know; for God is for me.	ἐπιστρέψουσιν οἱ ἐχθροί μου εἰς τὰ ὀπίσω, ἐν ᾗ ἂν ἡμέρᾳ ἐπικαλέσωμαί σε· ἰδοὺ ἔγνων ὅτι Θεός μου εἶ σύ.
10	בֵּ֭אלֹהִים אֲהַלֵּ֣ל דָּבָ֑ר בַּ֝יהֹוָ֗ה אֲהַלֵּ֥ל דָּבָֽר׃	In God will I praise his word: in the LORD will I praise his word.	ἐπὶ τῷ Θεῷ αἰνέσω ῥῆμα, ἐπὶ τῷ Κυρίῳ αἰνέσω λόγον.
11	בֵּאלֹהִ֣ים בָּ֭טַחְתִּי לֹּ֣א אִירָ֑א מַה־יַּעֲשֶׂ֖ה אָדָ֣ם לִֽי׃	In God have I put my trust: I will not be afraid what man can do unto me.	ἐπὶ τῷ Θεῷ ἤλπισα, οὐ φοβηθήσομαι τί ποιήσει μοι ἄνθρωπος.
12	עָלַ֣י אֱלֹהִ֣ים נְדָרֶ֑יךָ אֲשַׁלֵּ֖ם תּוֹדֹ֣ת לָֽךְ׃	Thy vows are upon me, O God: I will render praises unto thee.	ἐν ἐμοί, ὁ Θεός, εὐχαί, ἃς ἀποδώσω αἰνέσεώς σου,
13	כִּ֤י הִצַּ֪לְתָּ נַפְשִׁ֡י מִמָּוֶת֮ הֲלֹ֥א רַגְלַ֗י מִ֫דֶּ֥חִי לְ֭הִֽתְהַלֵּךְ לִפְנֵ֣י אֱלֹהִ֑ים בְּ֝א֗וֹר הַחַיִּֽים׃	For thou hast delivered my soul from death: wilt not thou deliver my feet from falling, that I may walk before God in the light of the living?	ὅτι ἐρρύσω τὴν ψυχήν μου ἐκ θανάτου καὶ τοὺς πόδας μου ἐξ ὀλισθήματος· εὐαρεστήσω ἐνώπιον Κυρίου ἐν φωτὶ ζώντων.

=== Heading ===
In the Hebrew Bible, Psalm 56:1 comprises the designation

To the chief Musician upon Jonath-elem-rechokim, Michtam of David, when the Philistines took him in Gath. (KJV)

rendered in the New King James Version as "Set to 'The Silent Dove in Distant Lands'." Jonath-elem-rechokim, meaning "The Silent Dove in Distant Lands", may have been the name of a particular tune or style. From then on verses 1–13 in English versions correspond to verses 2–14 in the Hebrew text. The heading in the Septuagint reads "for the people far off from the holy places (or holy people)", while the Targum has "concerning the congregation of Israel, which is compared to a silent dove at the time when they were far from their cities, and turned again and praised the Lord of the world'".
