= Miktam =

Word in the heading of six Hebrew psalms

Miktam or Michtam (Hebrew: מִכְתָּם) is a word of unknown meaning found in the headings of Psalms 16 and 56–60 in the Hebrew Bible. These six Psalms, and many others, are associated with King David, but this tradition is more likely to be sentimental than historical. They may have formed one of several smaller collections of psalms which preceded the present psalter and on which it was based.

Miktam corresponds to the Babylonian nakamu, lid, a metal cover for a vessel, but efforts to derive a meaning for the term in the Psalms have not been convincing. "When Eben Esra connected the Hebrew miktam with the word kéthem, gold, he was at any rate inspired. Other explanations of miktam which have come down through the LXX translators, the Targums and the Latin versions only show how completely the rubric had been forgotten."

In modern Hebrew, the word has come to mean "epigram", and numerous collections of Hebrew epigrams have used that word in their titles.

== See also ==
- Psalms § Use in Jewish ritual
