= Becker Psalter =

1602 German metrical psalter by Cornelius Becker

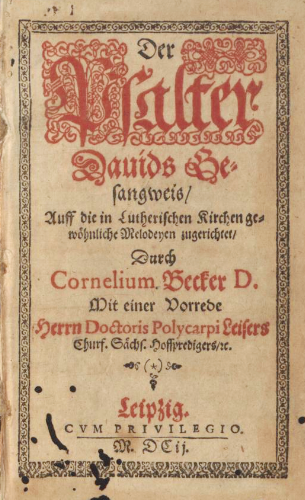
Front page of the Becker Psalter (1602)

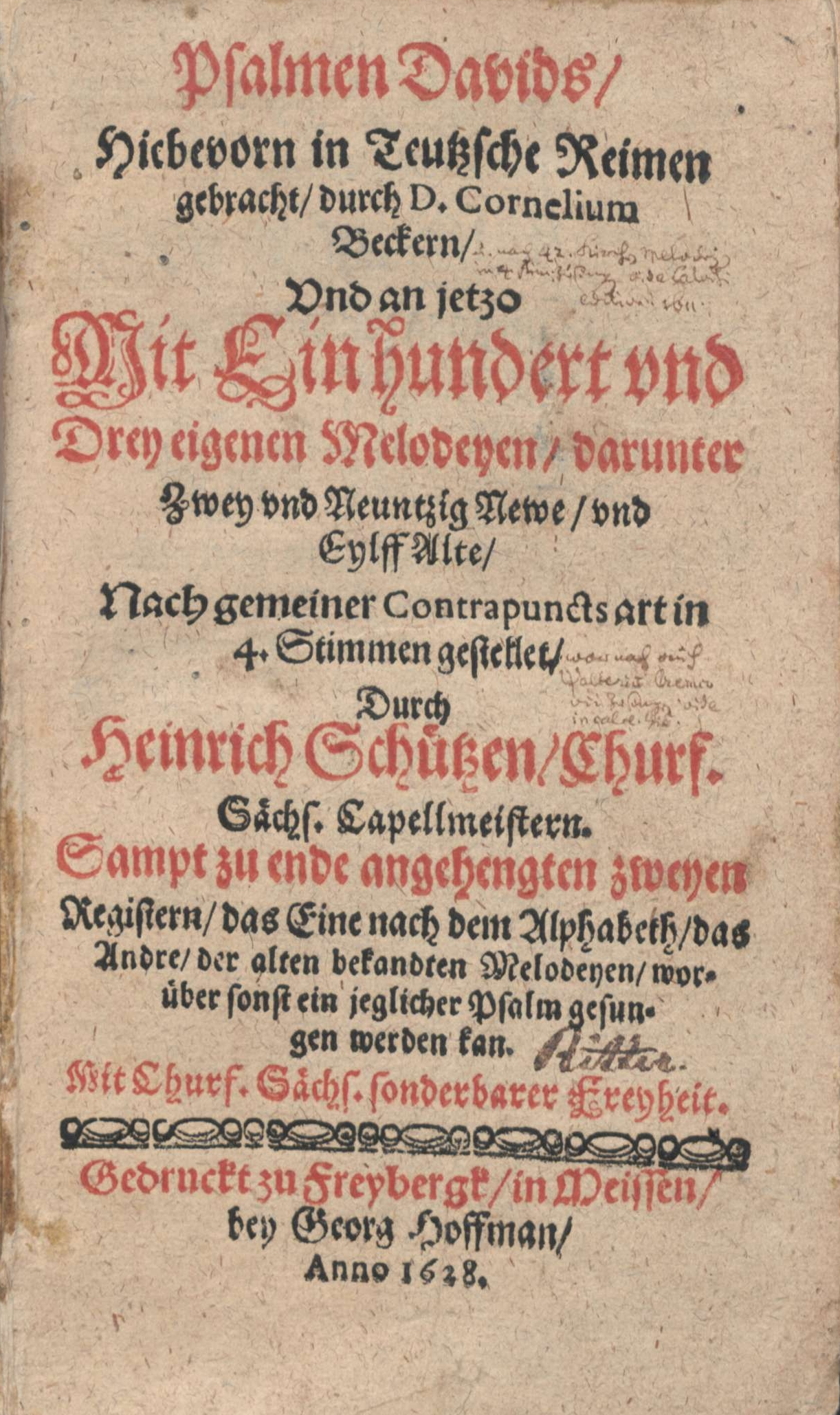
1628 first edition of Heinrich Schütz's Becker Psalter

The Becker Psalter is a German metrical psalter authored by the Leipzig theologian Cornelius Becker and first published by Jakob Apel in Leipzig in 1602 under the title Der Psalter Davids Gesangweis. Several composers set the psalms contained in the volume, notably Heinrich Schütz, whose four-part chorales were published in 1628 (in Freiburg) and revised and expanded in 1661 (in Dresden); the Schütz works bear the catalog numbers SWV 97 to SWV 256.

== Content ==
Becker included in his Psalter earlier Lutheran paraphrases of psalms, such as "Aus tiefer Not schrei ich zu dir", "Ach Gott, vom Himmel sieh darein", "Erbarm dich mein", "Ein feste Burg ist unser Gott" and "An Wasserflüssen Babylon". The 1602 publication, titled Der Psalter Dauids Gesangweis, was without melodies and meant to be sung to the tunes of other well-known Lutheran hymns.

== Schütz ==
Heinrich Schütz welcomed the theological intentions of Becker's metrical versions of the psalms, and wrote four-part settings which he published in 1628 as Psalmen Davids: Hiebevorn in Teutzsche Reimen gebracht durch D. Cornelium Beckern. The collection was reprinted in 1640, and appeared in a revised and enlarged version in 1661. In number of prints and editions it was Schütz's most successful work from the 17th to the early 18th century.

== Sources ==
- Herbst, Wolfgang; Seibt, Ilsabe, eds. (2012). Liederkunde zum Evangelischen Gesangbuch. Vol. 17. Vandenhoeck & Ruprecht. ISBN 9783525503409.
- Schütz, Heinrich (2013). "47. Becker Psalter (Freiberg, 1628): Title Page and Dedication to Electress Hedwig, Duchess of Saxony (6 September 1627)". A Heinrich Schütz Reader: Letters and Documents in Translation. Translated by Johnston, Gregory S. United States: Oxford University Press. pp. 62–64. ISBN 978-0199812202.
- Zahn, Johannes (1893). Die Melodien der deutschen evangelischen Kirchenlieder (in German). Vol. VI. Gütersloh: Bertelsmann.
