= Sons of Korah =

Sons of Korah may refer to

- Sons of Korah (Bible)
- Sons of Korah (band)

== See also ==
- Sons of Korhal, a rebel group in the StarCraft franchise
