= Psalm 86 =

86th psalm of the Book of Psalms

- "Bow down thine ear, O Lord, hear me"
- Other name: Psalm 85; "Inclina Domine aurem tuam"
- Language: Hebrew (original)

Psalm 86
- ← Psalm 85 Psalm 87 →
- Book: Book of Psalms
- Hebrew Bible part: Ketuvim
- Order in the Hebrew part: 1
- Category: Sifrei Emet
- Christian Bible part: Old Testament
- Order in the Christian part: 19

Psalm 86 is the 86th psalm of the Book of Psalms, beginning in English in the King James Version: "Bow down thine ear, O Lord, hear me: for I am poor and needy". In the slightly different numbering system used in the Greek Septuagint and Latin Vulgate translations of the Bible, this psalm is Psalm 85. In Latin, it is known as "Inclina Domine". It is attributed to David.

The psalm forms a regular part of Jewish, Catholic, Lutheran, Anglican and other Protestant liturgies. It has been paraphrased in hymns and set to music, including settings by Heinrich Schütz in German and Basil Harwood in Latin. Henry Purcell and Gustav Holst composed elaborate anthems in English. In Mendelssohn's Elijah, three verses from Psalm 86 are used in the narration.

== A prayer of David ==
The psalm bears the title "A Prayer of David" (תְּפִלָּ֗ה לְדָ֫וִ֥ד; tə-p̄i-lāh lə-ḏā-wiḏ). It is one of five psalms labeled as "prayer" (tephillah), and bears a resemblance to Psalm 17, which also has this title (cf. Psalm 90, known as the "prayer of Moses"). This psalm is the only one attributed to David in Book 3 of Psalms (comprising Psalms 73 to 89). The preceding three psalms (Psalms 83-85) and Psalms 87 and 88 are attributed to the sons of Korah.

== Analysis ==
Biblical commentator Cyril Rodd suggests that three parts are transparent in this psalm:

The first, verses 1–7, are 'a plea for help'; in relation to 'the psalmist's piety' (verses 1–4) and 'the character of God' (verses 5–7). The second, verses 8–13, form a hymn, 'interrupted by a call on God to teach the psalmist' (verse 11), and concluding with 'thankful confidence' for answered prayer, and 'a vow to offer praise'/'sacrifice a thank-offering' (verses 12–13) The final part, verses 14–17, are 'renewed prayer', ending with a request for a 'sign' or the 'salvation'.

The composition of the psalm features frequent parallels and repetitions, such as an eightfold 'for' (verses 1, 2, 3, 4, 5, 7, 10, 13), the repeated 'Lord' eleven times (verses 1, 3, 4, 5, 6, 8, 9, 11, 12, 15, 17, with seven of them being adonai (verses 3, 4, 5, 8, 9, 12, 15), and the four others as "YHWH". The psalmist is named the 'servant' of YHWH (abdeka; "your servant") in verses 2, 4, 16, which may indicate literary patterns. A chiastic structure has been discovered, with verse 11 in the center:

1–4

5–6

7

8–10

11

12–13

14

15

16–17

Verses 5 and 15 refer to Exodus 34:6–7; verse 16 is a paraphrase of the middle part in the Priestly Blessing (Numbers 6:25).

== Verse 1 ==
Bow down Your ear, O Lord, hear me;
For I am poor and needy.

The same statement appears in Psalm 40:17.

== Uses ==
=== New Testament ===
- Verse 9 is quoted in Revelation 15:4.

=== Judaism ===
- Verse 5 is part of one of the intermediate paragraphs of Uva Letzion.
- Verse 8 is recited when opening the Hakafot on Simchat Torah.
- Verses 9 and 10 are part of Baruch Hashem L'Olam during Maariv.
- In the Nusach Sefard, this psalm is recited before the daily psalm (Shir shel Yom) on days that tachanun is recited.

=== Eastern Orthodox Church ===
In the Eastern Orthodox Church, Psalm 85 (Psalm 86 in the Masoretic Text) is read daily at the Ninth Hour. It is part of the twelfth Kathisma division of the Psalter, read at Vespers on Wednesday evenings, as well as on Tuesdays and Thursdays during Lent, at Matins and the Ninth Hour, respectively.

=== Coptic Orthodox Church ===
In the Agpeya, the Coptic Church's book of hours, this psalm is prayed in the office of Sext, as well as the first watch of the Midnight office. It is also in the prayer of the Veil, which is generally prayed only by monks.

=== Book of Common Prayer ===
In the Church of England's Book of Common Prayer, this psalm is appointed to be read on the morning of the 17th day of the month.

=== Historic uses ===
An inscription in Koine Greek, the language used in the New Testament, discovered in 2023 at the Byzantine monastery of Kastellion from the Judaean Desert, represents a paraphrase of part of Psalm 86, where the original invocation of "the Lord" has been replaced by one of Jesus Christ.

== Musical settings ==
Several hymns paraphrase Psalm 86 or parts of it, including "Bow down Thine ear, O Lord".

The Renaissance composer Cristóbal de Morales composed a motet in Latin, "Inclina Domine aurem tuam", first published in 1543.Wacław z Szamotuł composed Nakłoń, Panie, ku mnie ucho Twoje song to the Polish translation of Psalm 86 by Mikołaj Rej in the 16th century. Heinrich Schütz set a German metric paraphrase, "Herr, neig zu mir dein gnädigs Ohr" (Lord, bow to me your gracious ear) as part of the 1602 Becker Psalter, as SWV 183. Henry Purcell composed an anthem, Bow down thine ear, O Lord, Z11, in 1681 or earlier. It is based on verses 1, 3–6, 8, 10–12, alternating soloists and choir, with organ.

Andreas Romberg wrote seven psalm settings for different unaccompanied choirs, titled Psalmodie, Op. 65, between 1817 and 1820, using translations into German by Moses Mendelssohn. Psalm 86 is the first, written for a five-part choir SSATB. In Mendelssohn's Elijah, three verses from Psalm 86 are used in the narration of the oratorio. In #2, a duet, the beginning is used to begin a plea, and in #8, the scene between Elijah and the widow, he first paraphrases verse 16 and then quotes verse 15, "for Thou art gracious, and full of compassion and plenteous in mercy and truth", praying to bring her son back to life.

British composer Clara Ross (1858–1954) used Psalm 86 for the text of her song "Comfort the Soul of Thy Servant". William Crotch set verse 4 as an anthem for choir and organ, Comfort, O Lord, The Soul of Thy Servant. Basil Harwood composed a setting of the psalm for his doctoral thesis in 1896, Inclina domine. Walter Piston composed a setting in English for four-part choir and piano. Gustav Holst set Psalm 86, together with Psalm 148 in English, "To my humble supplication", for mixed choir, string orchestra and organ in 1912. George Enescu planned a symphony in F minor for baritone, choir and orchestra on text from Psalm 86, but left only fragments c. 1917.

In 1985, Xaver Paul Thoma composed a setting for mezzo-soprano, viola and organ, premiered in 1993 in Karlsruhe-Durlach by Henrike Paede, Jean-Eric Souzy as violist and Hans Martin Corrinth as the organist.

The South African composer Stefans Grové wrote a setting (from verse 10) for children's choir, choir, African drums, marimba, and string orchestra in 2002.

== Text ==
The following table shows the Hebrew text of the Psalm with vowels, alongside the Koine Greek text in the Septuagint and the English translation from the King James Version. Note that the meaning can slightly differ between these versions, as the Septuagint and the Masoretic Text come from different textual traditions. (Note: A 1917 translation directly from Hebrew to English by the Jewish Publication Society can be found here or here, and an 1844 translation directly from the Septuagint by L. C. L. Brenton can be found here. Both translations are in the public domain.) In the Septuagint, this psalm is numbered Psalm 85.

#	Hebrew	English	Greek
1	תְּפִלָּ֗ה לְדָ֫וִ֥ד הַטֵּֽה־יְהֹוָ֣ה אׇזְנְךָ֣ עֲנֵ֑נִי כִּֽי־עָנִ֖י וְאֶבְי֣וֹן אָֽנִי׃	(A Prayer of David.) Bow down thine ear, O LORD, hear me: for I am poor and needy.	Προσευχὴ τῷ Δαυΐδ. - ΚΛΙΝΟΝ, Κύριε, τὸ οὖς σου καὶ ἐπάκουσόν μου, ὅτι πτωχὸς καὶ πένης εἰμὶ ἐγώ.
2	שׇׁ֥מְרָ֣ה נַפְשִׁי֮ כִּֽי־חָסִ֢יד אָ֥֫נִי הוֹשַׁ֣ע עַ֭בְדְּךָ אַתָּ֣ה אֱלֹהַ֑י הַבּוֹטֵ֥חַ אֵלֶֽיךָ׃	Preserve my soul; for I am holy: O thou my God, save thy servant that trusteth in thee.	φύλαξον τὴν ψυχήν μου, ὅτι ὅσιός εἰμι· σῶσον τὸν δοῦλόν σου, ὁ Θεός μου, τὸν ἐλπίζοντα ἐπὶ σέ.
3	חׇנֵּ֥נִי אֲדֹנָ֑י כִּ֥י אֵלֶ֥יךָ אֶ֝קְרָ֗א כׇּל־הַיּֽוֹם׃	Be merciful unto me, O Lord: for I cry unto thee daily.	ἐλέησόν με, Κύριε, ὅτι πρὸς σὲ κεκράξομαι ὅλην τὴν ἡμέραν.
4	שַׂ֭מֵּחַ נֶ֣פֶשׁ עַבְדֶּ֑ךָ כִּ֥י אֵלֶ֥יךָ אֲ֝דֹנָ֗י נַפְשִׁ֥י אֶשָּֽׂא׃	Rejoice the soul of thy servant: for unto thee, O Lord, do I lift up my soul.	εὔφρανον τὴν ψυχὴν τοῦ δούλου σου, ὅτι πρὸς σέ, Κύριε, ἦρα τὴν ψυχήν μου.
5	כִּֽי־אַתָּ֣ה אֲ֭דֹנָי ט֣וֹב וְסַלָּ֑ח וְרַב־חֶ֝֗סֶד לְכׇל־קֹֽרְאֶֽיךָ׃	For thou, Lord, art good, and ready to forgive; and plenteous in mercy unto all them that call upon thee.	ὅτι σύ, Κύριε, χρηστὸς καὶ ἐπιεικὴς καὶ πολυέλεος πᾶσι τοῖς ἐπικαλουμένοις σε.
6	הַאֲזִ֣ינָה יְ֭הֹוָה תְּפִלָּתִ֑י וְ֝הַקְשִׁ֗יבָה בְּק֣וֹל תַּחֲנוּנוֹתָֽי׃	Give ear, O LORD, unto my prayer; and attend to the voice of my supplications.	ἐνώτισαι, Κύριε, τὴν προσευχήν μου καὶ πρόσχες τῇ φωνῇ τῆς δεήσεώς μου.
7	בְּי֣וֹם צָ֭רָתִֽי אֶקְרָאֶ֗ךָּ כִּ֣י תַעֲנֵֽנִי׃	In the day of my trouble I will call upon thee: for thou wilt answer me.	ἐν ἡμέρᾳ θλίψεώς μου ἐκέκραξα πρὸς σέ, ὅτι ἐπήκουσάς μου.
8	אֵין־כָּמ֖וֹךָ בָאֱלֹהִ֥ים ׀ אֲדֹנָ֗י וְאֵ֣ין כְּֽמַעֲשֶֽׂיךָ׃	Among the gods there is none like unto thee, O Lord; neither are there any works like unto thy works.	οὐκ ἔστιν ὅμοιός σοι ἐν θεοῖς, Κύριε, καὶ οὐκ ἔστι κατὰ τὰ ἔργα σου.
9	כׇּל־גּוֹיִ֤ם ׀ אֲשֶׁ֥ר עָשִׂ֗יתָ יָב֤וֹאוּ ׀ וְיִשְׁתַּחֲו֣וּ לְפָנֶ֣יךָ אֲדֹנָ֑י וִ֖יכַבְּד֣וּ לִשְׁמֶֽךָ׃	All nations whom thou hast made shall come and worship before thee, O Lord; and shall glorify thy name.	πάντα τὰ ἔθνη, ὅσα ἐποίησας, ἥξουσι καὶ προσκυνήσουσιν ἐνώπιόν σου, Κύριε, καὶ δοξάσουσι τὸ ὄνομά σου.
10	כִּֽי־גָד֣וֹל אַ֭תָּה וְעֹשֵׂ֣ה נִפְלָא֑וֹת אַתָּ֖ה אֱלֹהִ֣ים לְבַדֶּֽךָ׃	For thou art great, and doest wondrous things: thou art God alone.	ὅτι μέγας εἶ σὺ καὶ ποιῶν θαυμάσια, σὺ εἶ Θεὸς μόνος.
11	ה֘וֹרֵ֤נִי יְהֹוָ֨ה ׀ דַּרְכֶּ֗ךָ אֲהַלֵּ֥ךְ בַּאֲמִתֶּ֑ךָ יַחֵ֥ד לְ֝בָבִ֗י לְיִרְאָ֥ה שְׁמֶֽךָ׃	Teach me thy way, O LORD; I will walk in thy truth: unite my heart to fear thy name.	ὁδήγησόν με, Κύριε, ἐν τῇ ὁδῷ σου, καὶ πορεύσομαι ἐν τῇ ἀληθείᾳ σου· εὐφρανθήτω ἡ καρδία μου τοῦ φοβεῖσθαι τὸ ὄνομά σου.
12	אוֹדְךָ֤ ׀ אֲדֹנָ֣י אֱ֭לֹהַי בְּכׇל־לְבָבִ֑י וַאֲכַבְּדָ֖ה שִׁמְךָ֣ לְעוֹלָֽם׃	I will praise thee, O Lord my God, with all my heart: and I will glorify thy name for evermore.	ἐξομολογήσομαί σοι, Κύριε ὁ Θεός μου, ἐν ὅλῃ καρδίᾳ μου, καὶ δοξάσω τὸ ὄνομά σου εἰς τὸν αἰῶνα.
13	כִּֽי־חַ֭סְדְּךָ גָּד֣וֹל עָלָ֑י וְהִצַּ֥לְתָּ נַ֝פְשִׁ֗י מִשְּׁא֥וֹל תַּחְתִּיָּֽה׃	For great is thy mercy toward me: and thou hast delivered my soul from the lowest hell.	ὅτι τὸ ἔλεός σου μέγα ἐπ᾿ ἐμὲ καὶ ἐρρύσω τὴν ψυχήν μου ἐξ ᾅδου κατωτάτου.
14	אֱלֹהִ֤ים ׀ זֵ֘דִ֤ים קָֽמוּ־עָלַ֗י וַעֲדַ֣ת עָ֭רִיצִים בִּקְשׁ֣וּ נַפְשִׁ֑י וְלֹ֖א שָׂמ֣וּךָ לְנֶגְדָּֽם׃	O God, the proud are risen against me, and the assemblies of violent men have sought after my soul; and have not set thee before them.	ὁ Θεός, παράνομοι ἐπανέστησαν ἐπ᾿ ἐμέ, καὶ συναγωγὴ κραταιῶν ἐζήτησαν τὴν ψυχήν μου καὶ οὐ προέθεντό σε ἐνώπιον αὐτῶν.
15	וְאַתָּ֣ה אֲ֭דֹנָי אֵל־רַח֣וּם וְחַנּ֑וּן אֶ֥רֶךְ אַ֝פַּ֗יִם וְרַב־חֶ֥סֶד וֶאֱמֶֽת׃	But thou, O Lord, art a God full of compassion, and gracious, longsuffering, and plenteous in mercy and truth.	καὶ σύ, Κύριε ὁ Θεός μου, οἰκτίρμων καὶ ἐλεήμων, μακρόθυμος καὶ πολυέλεος καὶ ἀληθινός.
16	פְּנֵ֥ה אֵלַ֗י וְחׇ֫נֵּ֥נִי תְּנָֽה־עֻזְּךָ֥ לְעַבְדֶּ֑ךָ וְ֝הוֹשִׁ֗יעָה לְבֶן־אֲמָתֶֽךָ׃	O turn unto me, and have mercy upon me; give thy strength unto thy servant, and save the son of thine handmaid.	ἐπίβλεψον ἐπ᾿ ἐμὲ καὶ ἐλέησόν με, δὸς τὸ κράτος σου τῷ παιδί σου καὶ σῶσον τὸν υἱὸν τῆς παιδίσκης σου.
17	עֲשֵֽׂה־עִמִּ֥י א֗וֹת לְט֫וֹבָ֥ה וְיִרְא֣וּ שֹׂנְאַ֣י וְיֵבֹ֑שׁוּ כִּֽי־אַתָּ֥ה יְ֝הֹוָ֗ה עֲזַרְתַּ֥נִי וְנִחַמְתָּֽנִי׃	Shew me a token for good; that they which hate me may see it, and be ashamed: because thou, LORD, hast holpen me, and comforted me.	ποίησον μετ᾿ ἐμοῦ σημεῖον εἰς ἀγαθόν, καὶ ἰδέτωσαν οἱ μισοῦντές με καὶ αἰσχυνθήτωσαν, ὅτι σύ, Κύριε, ἐβοήθησάς μοι καὶ παρεκάλεσάς με.

== Sources ==
- Berlin, Adele; Brettler, Marc Zvi (2004). "Psalms". In Berlin, Adele; Brettler, Marc Zvi; Fishbane, Michael A. (eds.). The Jewish Study Bible. Oxford University Press. ISBN 978-0-19-529751-5.
- Rodd, C. S. (2007). "18. Psalms". In Barton, John; Muddiman, John (eds.). The Oxford Bible Commentary (first (paperback) ed.). Oxford University Press. pp. 355–405. ISBN 978-0-19-927718-6.
