= Psalm 87 =

87th psalm of the book of psalms

- "His Foundation is in the Holy Mountains"
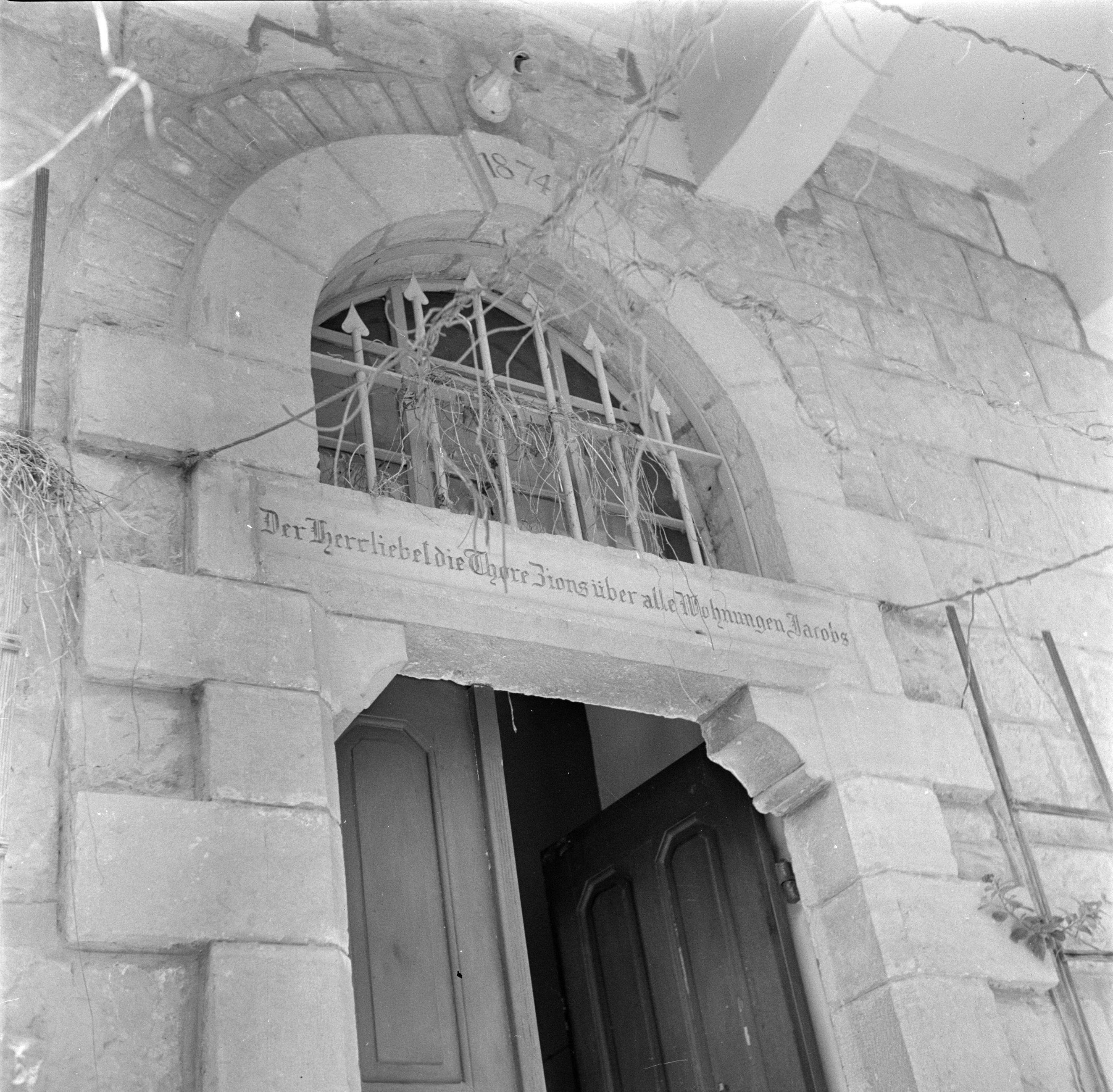
- The German inscription on the doorpost of a building in Jerusalem (1948) "The LORD loveth the gates of Zion more than all the dwellings of Jacob" from Psalm 87:2.
- Other name: Psalm 86; "Fundamenta eius in montibus sanctis"
- Text: by Korahites
- Language: Hebrew (original)

Psalm 87
- ← Psalm 86 Psalm 88 →
- Book: Book of Psalms
- Hebrew Bible part: Ketuvim
- Order in the Hebrew part: 1
- Category: Sifrei Emet
- Christian Bible part: Old Testament
- Order in the Christian part: 19

Psalm 87 is the 87th psalm of the Book of Psalms, beginning in English in the King James Version: "His foundation is in the holy mountains.". In the slightly different numbering system used in the Greek Septuagint and Latin Vulgate translations of the Bible, this psalm is Psalm 86. In Latin, it is known as "Fundamenta eius in montibus sanctis". It was written by the sons of Korach. It describes Jerusalem as the center of the world or the "mother of nations", where God placed the Torah.

The psalm forms a regular part of Jewish, Catholic liturgies. Psalm 87 has been paraphrased as the hymn "Glorious Things of Thee Are Spoken", and set to music from Baroque to contemporary and popular.

The Psalms depict a splendid vision for Jerusalem, wherein individuals from historically adversarial groups to Israel are envisioned as being metaphorically 'born in Zion.' These groups, symbolized by Rahab representing Egypt, Babylonia, Philistia, Tyre, and Cush, stand united in an unexpected reconciliation. According to O. Palmer Robertson, this portrayal signifies a remarkable strategy for conquering adversaries.

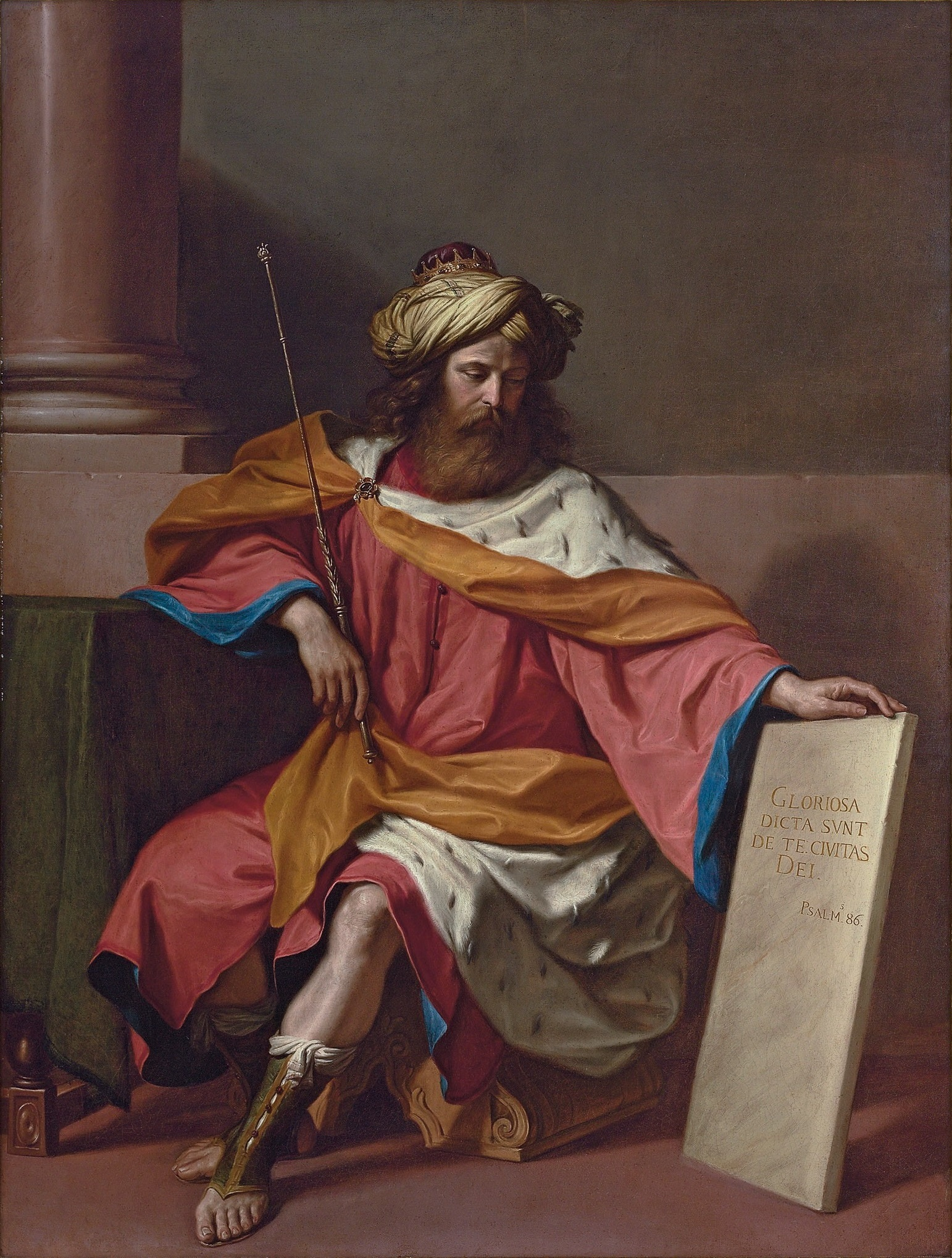
Painting of David by Giovanni Francesco Barbieri, c. 1768; carved on the stone slab is a line from Ps 87 (86): Gloriosa dicta sunt de te, civitas Dei ("Glorious things are spoken of thee, O city of God.")

== Commentary ==
The psalm is classified as one of the "Songs of Zion", looking to the future Jerusalem as the 'center of universal worship' and listing some of the surrounding nations (from which Jewish proselytes have come to the festivals) or as a 'reference to Jews who come from different countries in the dispersion'.

"Rahab" in verse 4 may refer to 'the primeval monster quelled by YHWH in ancient story' (cf. Psalm 89:10), here to represent "Egypt", whereas the 'springs' (verse 7) may symbolize "divine blessing", placing Zion as 'the source of the streams of Paradise'.

== Uses ==
=== Eastern Orthodox Church ===
In the Eastern Orthodox Church, Psalm 86 (Psalm 87 in the Masoretic Text) is part of the twelfth Kathisma division of the Psalter, read at Vespers on Wednesday evenings, as well as on Tuesdays and Thursdays during Lent, at Matins and the Ninth Hour, respectively. It is also part of the Great Hours on Christmas Eve.

=== Coptic Orthodox Church ===
In the Agpeya, the Coptic Church's book of hours, this psalm is prayed in the office of Sext.

=== Book of Common Prayer ===
In the Church of England's Book of Common Prayer, this psalm is appointed to be read on the morning of the seventeenth day of the month.

== Musical settings ==
The English hymn "Glorious Things of Thee Are Spoken" by John Newton is based on Psalm 87, as also the German 1984 hymn "Alle meine Quellen entspringen in dir" by Leonore Heinzl, which quotes the end of the last verse as a refrain. It was later sung with music from Haydn's Gott erhalte Franz den Kaiser (1797).

Heinrich Schütz set the psalm in a metred version in German, "Fest ist gegründet Gottes Stadt", SWV 184, as part of the Becker Psalter, first published in 1628. Marc-Antoine Charpentier set around 1680 "Fundamenta ejus in montibus sanctis", H.187, for 3 voices and continuo. The first movement of Bach's cantata Ihr Tore zu Zion, BWV 193, is based on verse 2 from the psalm.

Arthur Hutchings set the text of Psalm 87 in his Her Foundations are on the Holy Hills, which is also the motto of Durham University.

The psalm is featured on the 1975 album Psalms for I by Prince Far I.

== Text ==
The following table shows the Hebrew text of the Psalm with vowels, alongside the Koine Greek text in the Septuagint and the English translation from the King James Version. Note that the meaning can slightly differ between these versions, as the Septuagint and the Masoretic Text come from different textual traditions. (Note: A 1917 translation directly from Hebrew to English by the Jewish Publication Society can be found here or here, and an 1844 translation directly from the Septuagint by L. C. L. Brenton can be found here. Both translations are in the public domain.) In the Septuagint, this psalm is numbered Psalm 86.

#	Hebrew	English	Greek
1	לִבְנֵי־קֹ֭רַח מִזְמ֣וֹר שִׁ֑יר יְ֝סוּדָת֗וֹ בְּהַרְרֵי־קֹֽדֶשׁ׃	(A Psalm or Song for the sons of Korah.) His foundation is in the holy mountains.	Τοῖς υἱοῖς Κορὲ ψαλμὸς ᾠδῆς. - ΟΙ ΘΕΜΕΛΙΟΙ αὐτοῦ ἐν τοῖς ὄρεσι τοῖς ἁγίοις·
2	אֹהֵ֣ב יְ֭הֹוָה שַׁעֲרֵ֣י צִיּ֑וֹן מִ֝כֹּ֗ל מִשְׁכְּנ֥וֹת יַעֲקֹֽב׃	The LORD loveth the gates of Zion more than all the dwellings of Jacob.	ἀγαπᾷ Κύριος τὰς πύλας Σιὼν ὑπὲρ πάντα τὰ σκηνώματα ᾿Ιακώβ.
3	נִ֭כְבָּדוֹת מְדֻבָּ֣ר בָּ֑ךְ עִ֖יר הָאֱלֹהִ֣ים סֶֽלָה׃	Glorious things are spoken of thee, O city of God. Selah.	δεδοξασμένα ἐλαλήθη περὶ σοῦ ἡ πόλις τοῦ Θεοῦ. (διάψαλμα).
4	אַזְכִּ֤יר ׀ רַ֥הַב וּבָבֶ֗ל לְֽיֹ֫דְעָ֥י הִנֵּ֤ה פְלֶ֣שֶׁת וְצֹ֣ר עִם־כּ֑וּשׁ זֶ֝֗ה יֻלַּד־שָֽׁם׃	I will make mention of Rahab and Babylon to them that know me: behold Philistia, and Tyre, with Ethiopia; this man was born there.	μνησθήσομαι Ῥαὰβ καὶ Βαβυλῶνος τοῖς γινώσκουσί με· καὶ ἰδοὺ ἀλλόφυλοι καὶ Τύρος καὶ λαὸς τῶν Αἰθιόπων, οὗτοι ἐγενήθησαν ἐκεῖ.
5	וּ֥לְצִיּ֨וֹן ׀ יֵאָמַ֗ר אִ֣ישׁ וְ֭אִישׁ יֻלַּד־בָּ֑הּ וְה֖וּא יְכוֹנְנֶ֣הָ עֶלְיֽוֹן׃	And of Zion it shall be said, This and that man was born in her: and the highest himself shall establish her.	μήτηρ Σιών, ἐρεῖ ἄνθρωπος, καὶ ἄνθρωπος ἐγενήθη ἐν αὐτῇ, καὶ αὐτὸς ἐθεμελίωσεν αὐτὴν ὁ ῞Υψιστος.
6	יְֽהֹוָ֗ה יִ֭סְפֹּר בִּכְת֣וֹב עַמִּ֑ים זֶ֖ה יֻלַּד־שָׁ֣ם סֶֽלָה׃	The LORD shall count, when he writeth up the people, that this man was born there. Selah.	Κύριος διηγήσεται ἐν γραφῇ λαῶν καὶ ἀρχόντων τούτων τῶν γεγενημένων ἐν αὐτῇ. (διάψαλμα).
7	וְשָׁרִ֥ים כְּחֹלְלִ֑ים כׇּֽל־מַעְיָנַ֥י בָּֽךְ׃	As well the singers as the players on instruments shall be there: all my springs are in thee.	ὡς εὐφραινομένων πάντων ἡ κατοικία ἐν σοί.
