= Psalm 88 =

88th psalm of the book of psalms

- "O LORD God of my salvation, I have cried day and night before thee"
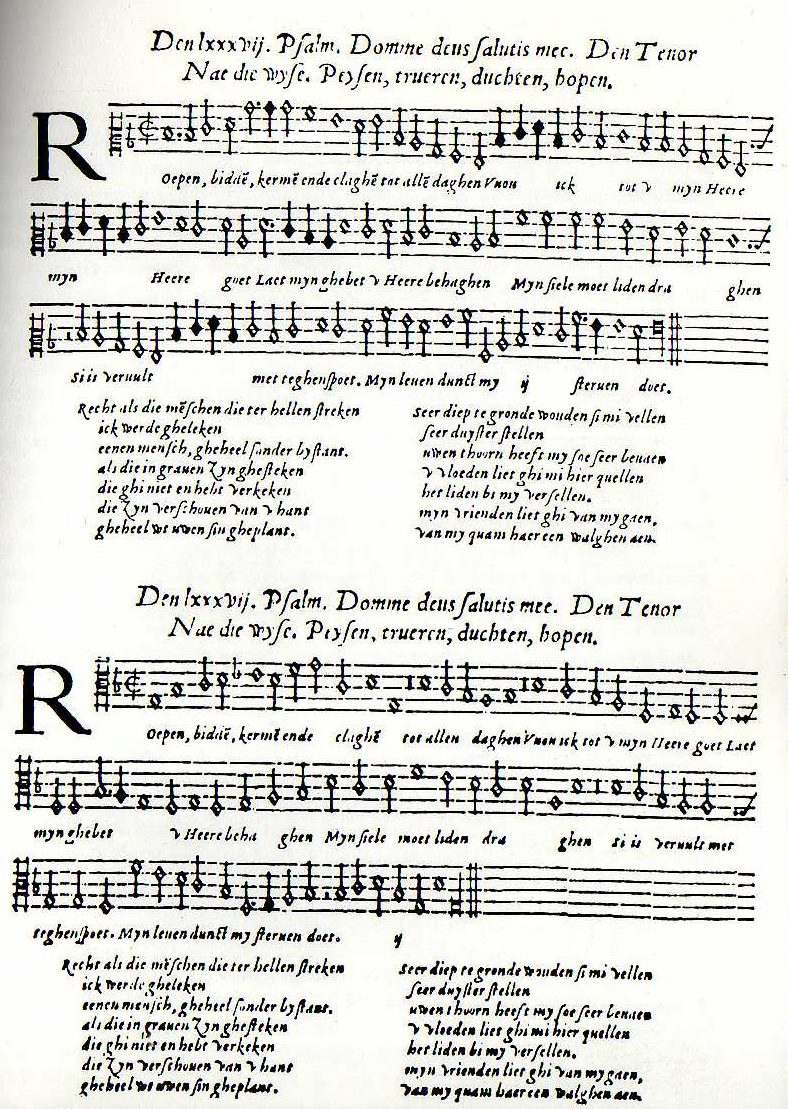
- Setting of Psalm 88 by Jacob Clemens non Papa, 1566
- Other name: Psalm 87; "Domine Deus salutis meae die clamavi et nocte coram te"
- Text: by Korahites
- Language: Hebrew (original)

Psalm 88
- ← Psalm 87 Psalm 89 →
- Book: Book of Psalms
- Hebrew Bible part: Ketuvim
- Order in the Hebrew part: 1
- Category: Sifrei Emet
- Christian Bible part: Old Testament
- Order in the Christian part: 19

Psalm 88 is the 88th psalm of the Book of Psalms, beginning in English in the King James Version: "O LORD God of my salvation, I have cried day and night before thee". In the slightly different numbering system used in the Greek Septuagint and Latin Vulgate translations of the Bible, this psalm is Psalm 87. In Latin, it is known as "Domine Deus salutis meae". According to the title, it is a "psalm of the sons of Korah" as well as a "maskil of Heman the Ezrahite".

The psalm forms a regular part of Jewish and Catholic liturgies as well as a part of Protestant psalmody. It has been set to music, for example by Baroque composers Heinrich Schütz in German and by Marc-Antoine Charpentier in Latin. In the 20th century, Christoph Staude and Jörg Duda set the psalm for choir or solo voice.

== Commentary ==
It is often assumed that the Psalm is a sick Psalm. The disease which laid low the psalmist could have been leprosy or some other unclean illness. Others see rather than a specific disease, a more general calamity.

By contrast, Hermann Gunkel contends that this psalm involves accusations against the Psalmist, regarding his sins mentioned.

Neale and Littledale find it "stands alone in all the Psalter for the unrelieved gloom, the hopeless sorrow of its tone. Even the very saddest of the others, and the Lamentations themselves, admit some variations of key, some strains of hopefulness; here only all is darkness to the close."

== Description ==
It is described Psalm for the sons of Korah, a prayer for mercy and deliverance, and a Maschil.

According to Martin Marty, a professor of church history at the University of Chicago, Psalm 88 is "a wintry landscape of unrelieved bleakness". Psalm 88 ends by saying:

You have taken my companions and loved ones from me;
the darkness is my closest friend.

Indeed, in Hebrew, the last word of the psalm is "darkness".

== Uses ==
=== Judaism ===
Psalm 88 is recited on Hoshana Rabbah.

=== Eastern Orthodox Church and Catholic Church ===
- Psalm 88 is part of the Six Psalms (Psalms 3, 38, 63, 88, 103 and 143) that constitute the heart of the orthros, that is to say Matins, in the Orthodox and Catholic churches of the Byzantine Rite.
- In the Liturgy of the Hours revised after Vatican II, the psalm is said on Fridays as part of compline.

=== Book of Common Prayer ===
In the Church of England's Book of Common Prayer, Psalm 88 is appointed to be read on the morning of the seventeenth day of the month, as well as at Evensong on Good Friday.

=== The Scottish Psalter ===
The Presbyterian Scottish Psalter of 1650 rewords the psalm in a metrical form that can be sung to a tune set to the common meter.

== Musical settings ==
Heinrich Schütz set the psalm in a metred version in German, "Herr Gott, mein Heiland, Nacht und Tag", SWV 185, as part of the Becker Psalter, first published in 1628. Marc-Antoine Charpentier compose around 1690 Domine Deus salutis meae, H.207, for soloists, chorus, flutes, strings, and continuo.

Verse 10 is used in a recitative of Mendelssohn's oratorio Elijah. Peter Cornelius wrote a choral setting in German as the first of Drei Psalmlieder, Op. 13.

In 1986, Christoph Staude set the psalm for three-part mixed choir and orchestra. Jörg Duda set the psalm as Exaltion III, Op. 31/3, for bass-baritone, horn, bass clarinet, cello and organ.

== Text ==
The following table shows the Hebrew text of the Psalm with vowels, alongside the Koine Greek text in the Septuagint and the English translation from the King James Version. Note that the meaning can slightly differ between these versions, as the Septuagint and the Masoretic Text come from different textual traditions. (Note: A 1917 translation directly from Hebrew to English by the Jewish Publication Society can be found here or here, and an 1844 translation directly from the Septuagint by L. C. L. Brenton can be found here. Both translations are in the public domain.) In the Septuagint, this psalm is numbered Psalm 87.

#	Hebrew	English	Greek
(Note: In the Jewish verse numbering, the ascription of this psalm is verse 1, and the rest of the psalm begins from verse 2. However, the Christian verse numbering does not count the ascription.)	שִׁ֥יר מִזְמ֗וֹר לִבְנֵ֫י־קֹ֥רַח לַמְנַצֵּ֣חַ עַל־מָחֲלַ֣ת לְעַנּ֑וֹת מַ֝שְׂכִּ֗יל לְהֵימָ֥ן הָאֶזְרָחִֽי׃	(A Song or Psalm for the sons of Korah, to the chief Musician upon Mahalath Leannoth, (Note: Mahalath Leannoth may have been the name of a particular tune or style.) Maschil of Heman the Ezrahite.)	᾿ῼδὴ ψαλμοῦ τοῖς υἱοῖς Κορέ· εἰς τὸ τέλος, ὑπὲρ μαελὲθ τοῦ ἀποκριθῆναι· συνέσεως Αἰμὰν τῷ ᾿Ισραηλίτῃ. -
1	יְ֭הֹוָה אֱלֹהֵ֣י יְשׁוּעָתִ֑י יוֹם־צָעַ֖קְתִּי בַלַּ֣יְלָה נֶגְדֶּֽךָ׃	O LORD God of my salvation, I have cried day and night before thee:	ΚΥΡΙΕ ὁ Θεὸς τῆς σωτηρίας μου, ἡμέρας ἐκέκραξα καὶ ἐν νυκτὶ ἐναντίον σου·
2	תָּב֣וֹא לְ֭פָנֶיךָ תְּפִלָּתִ֑י הַטֵּ֥ה אׇ֝זְנְךָ֗ לְרִנָּתִֽי׃	Let my prayer come before thee: incline thine ear unto my cry;	εἰσελθέτω ἐνώπιόν σου ἡ προσευχή μου, κλῖνον τὸ οὖς σου εἰς τὴν δέησίν μου.
3	כִּֽי־שָׂבְעָ֣ה בְרָע֣וֹת נַפְשִׁ֑י וְ֝חַיַּ֗י לִשְׁא֥וֹל הִגִּֽיעוּ׃	For my soul is full of troubles: and my life draweth nigh unto the grave.	ὅτι ἐπλήσθη κακῶν ἡ ψυχή μου, καὶ ἡ ζωή μου τῷ ᾅδῃ ἤγγισε·
4	נֶ֭חְשַׁבְתִּי עִם־י֣וֹרְדֵי ב֑וֹר הָ֝יִ֗יתִי כְּגֶ֣בֶר אֵֽין־אֱיָֽל׃	I am counted with them that go down into the pit: I am as a man that hath no strength:	προσελογίσθην μετὰ τῶν καταβαινόντων εἰς λάκκον, ἐγενήθην ὡσεὶ ἄνθρωπος ἀβοήθητος ἐν νεκροῖς ἐλεύθερος,
5	בַּמֵּתִ֗ים חׇ֫פְשִׁ֥י כְּמ֤וֹ חֲלָלִ֨ים ׀ שֹׁ֥כְבֵי קֶ֗בֶר אֲשֶׁ֤ר לֹ֣א זְכַרְתָּ֣ם ע֑וֹד וְ֝הֵ֗מָּה מִיָּדְךָ֥ נִגְזָֽרוּ׃	Free among the dead, like the slain that lie in the grave, whom thou rememberest no more: and they are cut off from thy hand.	ὡσεὶ τραυματίαι καθεύδοντες ἐν τάφῳ, ὧν οὐκ ἐμνήσθης ἔτι καὶ αὐτοὶ ἐκ τῆς χειρός σου ἀπώσθησαν.
6	שַׁ֭תַּנִי בְּב֣וֹר תַּחְתִּיּ֑וֹת בְּ֝מַחֲשַׁכִּ֗ים בִּמְצֹלֽוֹת׃	Thou hast laid me in the lowest pit, in darkness, in the deeps.	ἔθεντό με ἐν λάκκῳ κατωτάτῳ, ἐν σκοτεινοῖς καὶ ἐν σκιᾷ θανάτου.
7	עָ֭לַי סָמְכָ֣ה חֲמָתֶ֑ךָ וְכׇל־מִ֝שְׁבָּרֶ֗יךָ עִנִּ֥יתָ סֶּֽלָה׃	Thy wrath lieth hard upon me, and thou hast afflicted me with all thy waves. Selah.	ἐπ᾿ ἐμὲ ἐπεστηρίχθη ὁ θυμός σου, καὶ πάντας τοὺς μετεωρισμούς σου ἐπήγαγες ἐπ᾿ ἐμέ. (διάψαλμα).
8	הִרְחַ֥קְתָּ מְיֻדָּעַ֗י מִ֫מֶּ֥נִּי שַׁתַּ֣נִי תוֹעֵב֣וֹת לָ֑מוֹ כָּ֝לֻ֗א וְלֹ֣א אֵצֵֽא׃	Thou hast put away mine acquaintance far from me; thou hast made me an abomination unto them: I am shut up, and I cannot come forth.	ἐμάκρυνας τοὺς γνωστούς μου ἀπ᾿ ἐμοῦ, ἔθεντό με βδέλυγμα ἑαυτοῖς, παρεδόθην καὶ οὐκ ἐξεπορευόμην.
9	עֵינִ֥י דָאֲבָ֗ה מִנִּ֫י־עֹ֥נִי קְרָאתִ֣יךָ יְהֹוָ֣ה בְּכׇל־י֑וֹם שִׁטַּ֖חְתִּי אֵלֶ֣יךָ כַפָּֽי׃	Mine eye mourneth by reason of affliction: LORD, I have called daily upon thee, I have stretched out my hands unto thee.	οἱ ὀφθαλμοί μου ἠσθένησαν ἀπὸ πτωχείας· ἐκέκραξα πρὸς σέ, Κύριε, ὅλην τὴν ἡμέραν, διεπέτασα πρὸς σὲ τὰς χεῖράς μου·
10	הֲלַמֵּתִ֥ים תַּעֲשֶׂה־פֶּ֑לֶא אִם־רְ֝פָאִ֗ים יָק֤וּמוּ ׀ יוֹד֬וּךָ סֶּֽלָה׃	Wilt thou shew wonders to the dead? shall the dead arise and praise thee? Selah.	μὴ τοῖς νεκροῖς ποιήσεις θαυμάσια; ἢ ἰατροὶ ἀναστήσουσι, καὶ ἐξομολογήσονταί σοι;
11	הַיְסֻפַּ֣ר בַּקֶּ֣בֶר חַסְדֶּ֑ךָ אֱ֝מ֥וּנָתְךָ֗ בָּאֲבַדּֽוֹן׃	Shall thy lovingkindness be declared in the grave? or thy faithfulness in destruction?	μὴ διηγήσεταί τις ἐν τῷ τάφῳ τὸ ἔλεός σου καὶ τὴν ἀλήθειάν σου ἐν τῇ ἀπωλείᾳ;
12	הֲיִוָּדַ֣ע בַּחֹ֣שֶׁךְ פִּלְאֶ֑ךָ וְ֝צִדְקָתְךָ֗ בְּאֶ֣רֶץ נְשִׁיָּֽה׃	Shall thy wonders be known in the dark? and thy righteousness in the land of forgetfulness?	μὴ γνωσθήσεται ἐν τῷ σκότει τὰ θαυμάσιά σου καὶ ἡ δικαιοσύνη σου ἐν γῇ ἐπιλελησμένῃ;
13	וַאֲנִ֤י ׀ אֵלֶ֣יךָ יְהֹוָ֣ה שִׁוַּ֑עְתִּי וּ֝בַבֹּ֗קֶר תְּֽפִלָּתִ֥י תְקַדְּמֶֽךָּ׃	But unto thee have I cried, O LORD; and in the morning shall my prayer prevent thee.	κἀγὼ πρὸς σέ, Κύριε, ἐκέκραξα, καὶ τὸ πρωΐ ἡ προσευχή μου προφθάσει σε.
14	לָמָ֣ה יְ֭הֹוָה תִּזְנַ֣ח נַפְשִׁ֑י תַּסְתִּ֖יר פָּנֶ֣יךָ מִמֶּֽנִּי׃	LORD, why castest thou off my soul? why hidest thou thy face from me?	ἱνατί, Κύριε, ἀπωθῇ τὴν ψυχήν μου, ἀποστρέφεις τὸ πρόσωπόν σου ἀπ᾿ ἐμοῦ;
15	עָ֘נִ֤י אֲנִ֣י וְגֹוֵ֣עַ מִנֹּ֑עַר נָשָׂ֖אתִי אֵמֶ֣יךָ אָפֽוּנָה׃	I am afflicted and ready to die from my youth up: while I suffer thy terrors I am distracted.	πτωχός εἰμι ἐγὼ καὶ ἐν κόποις ἐκ νεότητός μου, ὑψωθεὶς δὲ ἐταπεινώθην καὶ ἐξηπορήθην.
16	עָ֭לַי עָבְר֣וּ חֲרוֹנֶ֑יךָ בִּ֝עוּתֶ֗יךָ צִמְּתוּתֻֽנִי׃	Thy fierce wrath goeth over me; thy terrors have cut me off.	ἐπ᾿ ἐμὲ διῆλθον αἱ ὀργαί σου, οἱ φοβερισμοί σου ἐξετάραξάν με,
17	סַבּ֣וּנִי כַ֭מַּיִם כׇּל־הַיּ֑וֹם הִקִּ֖יפוּ עָלַ֣י יָֽחַד׃	They came round about me daily like water; they compassed me about together.	ἐκύκλωσάν με ὡσεὶ ὕδωρ ὅλην τὴν ἡμέραν, περιέσχον με ἅμα.
18	הִרְחַ֣קְתָּ מִ֭מֶּנִּי אֹהֵ֣ב וָרֵ֑עַ מְֽיֻדָּעַ֥י מַחְשָֽׁךְ׃	Lover and friend hast thou put far from me, and mine acquaintance into darkness.	ἐμάκρυνας ἀπ᾿ ἐμοῦ φίλον καὶ πλησίον καὶ τοὺς γνωστούς μου ἀπὸ ταλαιπωρίας.
