= Jan Philip Schulze =

German classical pianist

Jan Philip Schulze is a German classical pianist.

== Life ==
Schulze studied with Klaus Schilde and Michael Schäfer at the University of Music and Performing Arts Munich and with Lev Naumov at the Moscow Conservatory. As accompanist and chamber musician, he played with Juliane Banse, Dietrich Henschel and Jonas Kaufmann, among others. He has performed in concert halls throughout Europe and at festivals in Edinburgh, Lucerne, Munich, Salzburg and Schwarzenberg. A special focus of his artistic work is the interpretation of New Music. He has given world premieres of works by Dror Feiler, Beat Furrer, Wolfgang Rihm, Dieter Schnebel, Johannes Schöllhorn and Christoph Staude. Since 2004 he is professor for Liedgestaltung at the Hochschule für Musik, Theater und Medien Hannover.

== Recordings ==
- 2005: Violeta Urmana singt Lieder (Farao)
- 2007: Piano Works by Hans Werner Henze
- 2013: Kammermusik – vielleicht – perhaps – peut-être by Josef Anton Riedl with Harald Lillmeyer, Erina Goto, Carin Levine, Michael Lentz (Neos)
- 2013: Klavierwerke by Jörg Widmann (Neos)
- 2013: Clouds and Sky für Klavier & Orchester by Johannes Schöllhorn with Gareth Davis, Jack Quartet, Ensemble S, WDR Symphony Orchestra Cologne, Peter Rundel (Mode)
- 2017: Piccoloworks with Natalie Schwaabe (Metier)
- 2017: Das Marienleben op.27 by Paul Hindemith with Rachel Harnisch (Naxos)
- 2017: Partita für Violine BWV 1004 by Johann Sebastian Bach with Gertrud Schilde, Norddeutscher Kammerchor and Maria Jürgensen (MDG)
- 2017: Modern Lied with Sarah Maria Sun (Mode)
- 2017: Klavierwerke by Nikolaus Brass (Neos)
- 2019: Doppler Discoveries with András Adorján and Emmanuel Pahud (Farao)
