= Alle meine Quellen entspringen in dir =

German hymn by Leonore Heinzl

- Christian hymn
- English: All my springs are in thee
- Text: by Leonore Heinzl
- Language: German
- Melody: by Heinzl
- Performed: 1984

"Alle meine Quellen entspringen in dir" (All my springs are in thee) is a Christian hymn in German with text and melody by Leonore Heinzl. She wrote it in 1984, based on a verse from Psalm 87, which forms the refrain. The song of the genre Neues Geistliches Lied is part of many hymnals and songbooks.

== History, text and music ==
Leonore Heinzl, a Franciscan sister from Kloster Maria Medingen, wrote both text and melody of "Alle meine Quellen entspringen in dir" in 1984. The text is derived from verse 7 of Psalm 87, "All my springs are in thee", which is used as the refrain to begin and end the song, framing four stanzas. The stanzas address God as the power gibing life, the living spirit, the supporting word, and faith. All four stanzas end with the line "Ströme von lebendigem Wasser brechen hervor" (Streams of living water burst forth).

The song appeared in many hymnals and songbooks, including Ein Segen sein / Junges Gotteslob.
