= Mike McCarthy (Australian singer-songwriter) =

Australian singer & songwriter

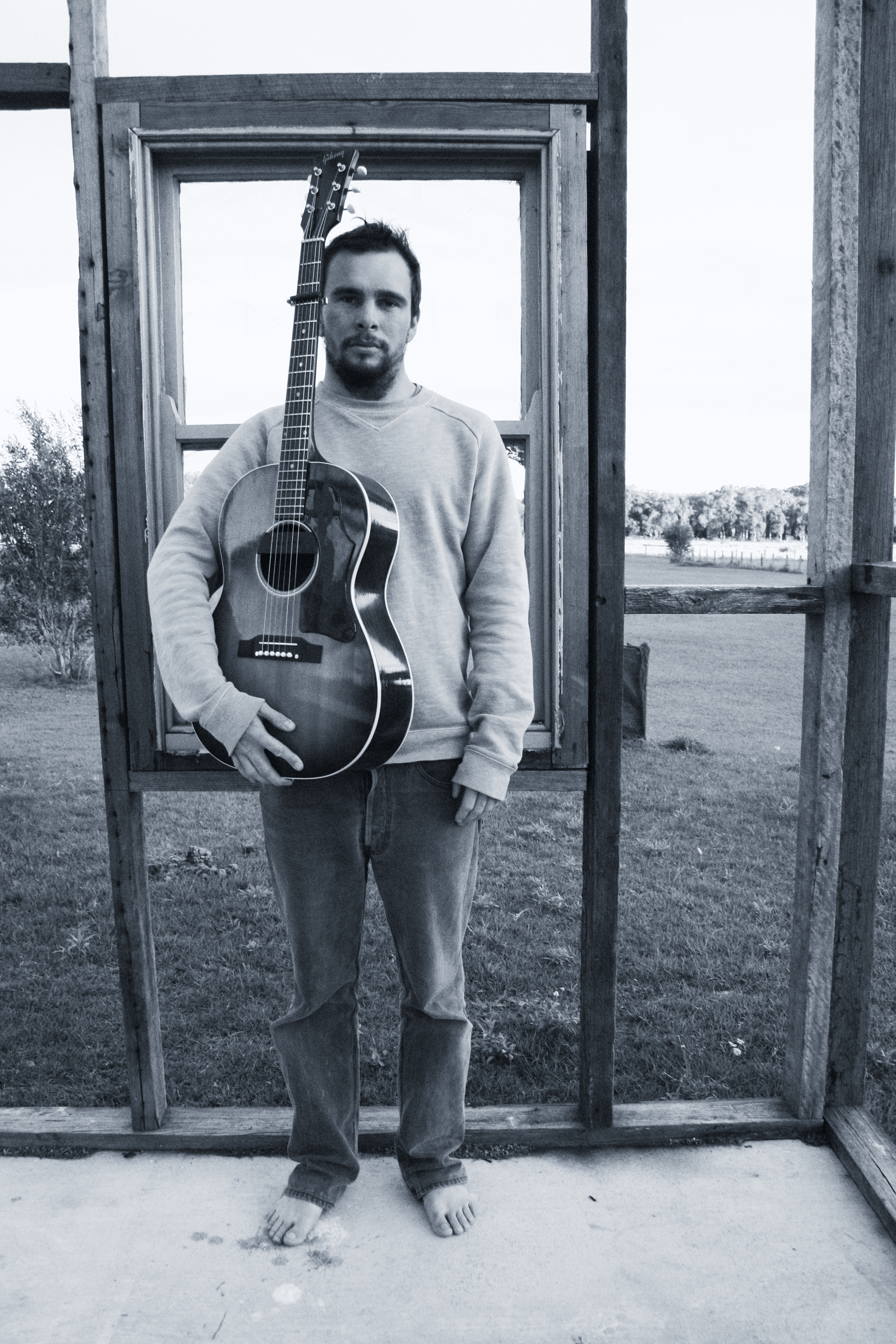

Background information
- Born: Michael Edward McCarthy
- Genres: Blues; folk
- Occupation: Musician
- Instruments: Vocals; guitar
- Years active: 1993–present
- Website: mikemccarthy.com.au

Michael Edward McCarthy is an Australian singer, songwriter and guitarist. He has released five solo studio albums, Wisdom is Delight (2001), Fire, Flood, Freedom (2003), Calm Wind (2006), The Harrowing Account of John William Tate (2008) and The Lion's Share (2012).

== Biography ==
In 1993 McCarthy began a funk band, Compos Mentis, with family friends Peter Harding and his brother, Tim and bass player, Sam O'Donnell. He was a guitarist, vocalist and songwriter in the band which he continued to play in until 1999 when he left to study Contemporary Music at Southern Cross University, Lismore.

Upon returning from Lismore, McCarthy released his first solo album entitled Wisdom is Delight. The album was recorded between Lismore, Central Coast and the studio of bass player and producer Robin Hay in Cooranbong. The album features 12 tracks written by McCarthy between 1999 and 2001.

In 2003, McCarthy released his second album Fire, Flood, Freedom which was recorded and produced by Jeremy Reynolds. The album features 12 tracks of which the title track features treatment on indigenous reconciliation.

After Fire, Flood, Freedom McCarthy released his first and only EP to date entitled Shelter and The Sea (2004) which included the title track, Circling Birds and four live recordings of songs from prior releases.

McCarthy's third album is Calm Wind (2006) recorded by engineer Jeff McCormack. The 11 songs were recorded live at McCormack's studios named The Music Cellar in Terrigal.

2008 saw the release of a fourth album The Harrowing Account of John William Tate which was created around a fictional narrative of a shipwrecked sailor named John William Tate. The style of the songs are described as soul and country folk.

For his next release McCarthy worked on a concept/instrumental album he named Colours. Recorded over 10 days in December 2009 in his studio Le Bunker, he devoted each day to recording a piece named after a colour. The album features several different instruments including acoustic, electric, slide and resonator guitars, bass guitar, glockenspiel, drums and accordion.

In 2012, McCarthy released his fifth studio album The Lion's Share. McCarthy says of the album, "I feel that The Lion's Share is a big step forward for me creatively. There was a freedom that came with taking more time to produce this album and I'm glad to have had help in wrestling it out."

== Live ==
Mike McCarthy performs regularly around Australia and has toured Japan, the United States and the United Kingdom. He was a regular performer at Lizotte's in Kincumber before it shutdown in 2015. He performed with his band at World Youth Day 2008 in Sydney.

== Music in surf films ==
McCarthy has had music featured in an array of surf films including Nathan Oldfield's Lines From A Poem, Seaworthy and The Heart and The Sea, Cryus Sutton's Stoked and Broke and Fred Dickerson and Matt McNeil's Alaska Sessions. In 2014 McCarthy released Seaside, a compilation of his music that has been featured in surf films.

== Other projects ==
Aside from his own material McCarthy has been a member of bands Birdlife, Sons of Korah and Sydney wedding band Soultraders.
