= Glorious Things of Thee Are Spoken =

18th-century English hymn by John Newton

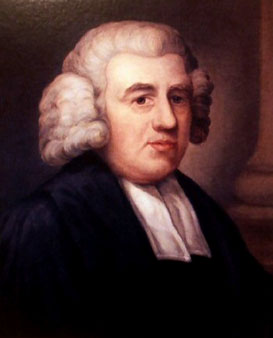
- John Newton
- Genre: Hymn
- Written: 1779
- Text: John Newton
- Based on: Psalm 87:3
- Meter: 8.7.8.7 D
- Melody: "Austrian Hymn" by Franz Josef Haydn

"Glorious Things of Thee Are Spoken", also called "Zion", or the "City of God", is an 18th-century English hymn written by John Newton, who also wrote the hymn "Amazing Grace". Shape note composer Alexander Johnson set it to his tune "Jefferson" in 1818, and as such it has remained in shape note collections such as the Sacred Harp ever since. However, the hymn is most often set to the tune of Joseph Haydn's "Gott erhalte Franz den Kaiser" (referred to in hymnals as "Austria"). (Note: The last line of each verse of the hymns "Gott erhalte Franz den Kaiser" and '"Deutschlandlied" is played twice. The last line of each verse of "Glorious Things of Thee are Spoken" is only played once, never twice.) In recent decades it has been sometimes replaced by "Abbot's Leigh". This was written for this text by Cyril Vincent Taylor in 1942 while he was a producer of Religious Broadcasting at the BBC and stationed at the village of Abbots Leigh. Multiple other tunes have also been used with the hymn.

Joseph Haydn

== History ==
The hymn was written by Newton after he had asked for assistance from his friend and neighbour, classical writer William Cowper, while he was the Church of England parish priest of Olney Church. With Cowper's assistance, Newton was able to publish the Olney Hymns Hymnal, which included "Glorious Things of Thee Are Spoken", in 1779. The hymn is based upon Psalm 87:3 and Isaiah 33:20–21. "Glorious Things of Thee Are Spoken" is considered to be Newton's best composition and was the only joyful hymn in the publication. The hymn has five verses of eight lines each.

The hymn was a favourite of Confederate General Stonewall Jackson. He is noted to have once awakened his soldiers in 1862 while they were in the Shenandoah Valley by singing "Glorious Things of Thee Are Spoken" out of tune.

== Lyrics ==
1. Glorious things of thee are spoken, Zion, city of our God.
He whose Word cannot be broken formed thee for his own abode.
On the Rock of Ages founded, what can shake thy sure repose?
With salvation's walls surrounded, thou may'st smile at all thy foes.

2. See, the streams of living waters, springing from eternal love,
Well supply thy sons and daughters and all fear of want remove.
Who can faint while such a river ever flows their thrist to assuage?
Grace, which like the Lord, the Giver, never fails from age to age.

3. Round each habitation hov'ring, see the cloud and fire appear
For a glory and a cov'ring, showing that the Lord is near.
Thus deriving from their banner light by night and shade by day,
Safe they feed upon the manna which He gives them on their way.

4. Blest inhabitants of Zion, washed in the Redeemer's blood!
Jesus, whom their souls rely on, makes them kings and priests to God.
'Tis his love his people raises over self to reign as kings:
and as priests, his solemn praises each for a thank-offering brings.

5. Savior, which of Zion's city I through grace a member am
Let the world deride or pity, I will glory in thy name
Fading is the worldling's pleasures, All his boasted pomp and show.
Solid joys and lasting treasures None but Zion's children know.

== Tune ==
Because of the practice of singing the hymn to a tune used for other purposes it has sometimes elicited unusual reactions. In 1936, the German Ambassador to the United Kingdom, Joachim von Ribbentrop gave a Nazi salute in Durham Cathedral when the hymn was played and had to be restrained by the Marquess of Londonderry. During the Second World War in an Oflag prisoner of war camp, a Protestant service was interrupted during the singing of "Glorious Things of Thee Are Spoken" by the camp guards singing the former Austrian anthem "Sei gesegnet ohne Ende", because the hymn was set to the same tune. The same Haydn melody is employed in the German national anthem formerly known, popularly, as Deutschland über alles — properly titled Das Lied der Deutschen or the Deutschlandlied, the third verse of which is the national anthem of present-day Germany. For some people, using this particular tune for the hymn (often named in various hymnals as "Austria") is often controversial as, despite the fact that it dates back to the 18th century, it raises reminders of Nazi Germany. Cyril Vincent Taylor's Abbot's Leigh tune was written in response to complaints received by the BBC during the war.

Below, a setting of the hymn as it appears in the Army and Navy Hymnal (1920): (Note: The original version of the tune, the German anthem and other hymnbooks show a two beat anacrusis starting the tune. The first bar lines therefore fall on "things", "spoken", "city" and "God".)

== Usage ==
The hymn is used by a wide range of Christian denominations, including Catholics. Words of the hymn may be changed depending on, for example, whether the congregation is Calvinist or Lutheran. Presbyterians often sing only three verses of the hymn.

John Rogers Thomas also used the words for one of his sacred songs from Hymns of the Church.
