= Psalm 85 =

85th psalm of the Book of Psalms

- "LORD, thou hast been favourable unto thy land"
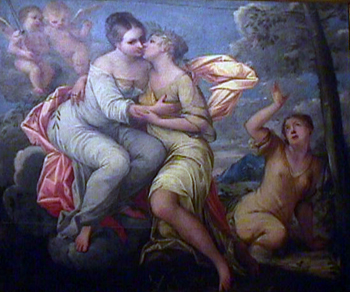
- Justitia et pax (Justice and Peace) by an anonymous artist
- Other name: "Benedixisti Domine terram tuam"
- Text: Korahites
- Language: Hebrew (original)

Psalm 85
- ← Psalm 84 Psalm 86 →
- Book: Book of Psalms
- Hebrew Bible part: Ketuvim
- Order in the Hebrew part: 1
- Category: Sifrei Emet
- Christian Bible part: Old Testament
- Order in the Christian part: 19

Psalm 85 is the 85th psalm of the Book of Psalms, one of a series of psalms attributed to the sons of Korah. In the English of the King James Version, this psalm begins: "LORD, thou hast been favourable unto thy land". In the slightly different numbering system used in the Greek Septuagint and Latin Vulgate translations of the Bible, this psalm is Psalm 84. In Latin, it is known as "Benedixisti Domine terram tuam". In Judaism, it is called "a psalm of returned exiles". The Jerusalem Bible describes it as a "prayer for peace".

The psalm forms a regular part of Jewish, Catholic, Lutheran, Anglican and other Protestant liturgies. It has been paraphrased in hymns and set to music. Its image of Justice and Peace kissing in verse 10 ("righteousness and peace" in versions such as the New International Version) was a popular theme in art work from the Middle Ages through the 18th century.

== Background and themes ==
While the superscript attributes this psalm to the sons of Korah, Christian commentators are undecided about the period in which the psalm was written. One suggestion is that it was penned at the end of the reign of Saul. Alexander Maclaren posits that the setting of Psalm 85 corresponds to the description in the Book of Nehemiah in which only part of the Jewish nation had returned from the Babylonian captivity. They returned "to a ruined city, a fallen Temple, and a mourning land, where they were surrounded by jealous and powerful enemies".

According to Jewish commentators, the sons of Korah are speaking prophetically about the conclusion of the Babylonian exile. They pray that God will also return the Jewish people from their current exile and remove his anger from them altogether. The image of kindness and truth "meeting" alludes to the interrelationship between Israel's truth and God's righteousness. When Israel adheres to the truth, God will respond with righteousness; He will send rain to produce abundant harvests. The International Standard Bible Encyclopedia also interprets the "kiss" shared by Righteousness and Peace (in the KJV translation) as signifying the spiritual union of "God bowing down from heaven to meet earth and earth rejoicing up to Him, foretelling the glory of salvation for the people".

According to the Midrash Tehillim, the land being referred to in this psalm is the Land of Israel, of which Scripture states, "A land which the Lord your God cares for; the eyes of the Lord your God are always upon it" (Deuteronomy 11:12). God waits for the Jewish people to perform the mitzvot (biblical commandments) associated with the Land – such as tithing the crops and observing the Shmita (sabbatical year) and Yovel (Jubilee year) – and when they do, both they and the land will find favor in God's eyes.

John Calvin summarizes the message of Psalm 85 as follows. After God's people returned from the Babylonian captivity they were suffering new afflictions. The people's voice in the psalm cries to God for deliverance on three counts: first, as a continuation of God's grace in bringing the people back from captivity, secondly, in view of the long period of their suffering, and lastly, in hope and confidence in the promises of God for blessing. On this last point, Calvin connects the restoration to Israel with the future kingdom of Christ.

=== Kissing or fighting? ===
The image of "Justice and Peace kissing" (per the KJV translation; Hebrew: צֶ֖דֶק וְשָׁל֣וֹם נָשָֽׁקוּ tseḏeq wə-šālōm nāšāqū) became a popular theme for artworks from the Middle Ages through the 18th century. However, the Hebrew root n-š-q (Hebrew: נשק) has several translations, including "kiss", "fight", and "fought against each other". According to Eder, the word describes a dynamic type of contact, whether positive or negative.

The Midrash understands this interaction in a turbulent context, relating it to God taking counsel with His ministering angels about whether to create the first man. The Midrash states:

Rabbi Simon said, "When the Holy One, blessed be He, came to create Adam, the ministering angels formed themselves into groups and parties, some of them saying, 'Let him be created,' whilst others urged, 'let him not be created.' Thus it is written, "Chesed [Kindness] and Truth fought together, Righteousness and Peace combated each other" (Psalms 85:11). Chesed said, 'Let him be created, because he will dispense acts of love'; Truth said, 'Let him not be created, because he is compounded of falsehood'; Righteousness said, 'Let him be created, because he will perform righteous deeds'; Peace said, 'Let him not be created, because he is full of strife.'

"What did the Holy One do? He took Truth and cast it to the ground. As it says, 'And truth was thrown to the ground...' (Daniel 8:12). The ministering angels said before the Almighty: 'Master of the worlds! Why do You put to shame Your chief of court?' The Almighty replied: 'Let Truth rise from the ground!' This is what is meant when it is written, 'Truth shall grow from the ground'" (Psalms 85:12).

== Uses ==
=== Judaism ===
In the Sephardic tradition, Psalm 85 is recited after Kaddish (Titkabel) during the afternoon service on Yom Kippur eve. Sephardi Jews also recite this psalm along with numerous others on Yom Kippur itself.

Verses 5 and 8 (in the Hebrew) are part of Selichot; verse 8 is also recited during the morning service in Pesukei Dezimra.

Psalm 85 is recited to express gratitude, as a prayer for a livelihood, and as a prayer for assistance in times of need.

=== Catholicism ===
The beginning of Psalm 85 is recommended as an introit or antiphon for Mass on Gaudete Sunday, the third Sunday of Advent.

The verse “Shew us, O Lord, thy mercy.” (Latin: “Óstende nobis, Dómine, misericórdiam tuam”) is said towards the end of the Prayers at the Foot of the Altar in the Tridentine Mass, also called the Extraordinary Form.

=== Coptic Orthodox Church ===
In the Agpeya, the Coptic Church's book of hours, this psalm is prayed in the office of Sext.

=== Book of Common Prayer ===
In the Church of England's Book of Common Prayer, this psalm is appointed to be read in the evening of the 16th day of the month, as well as at Mattins on Christmas Day.

== Hymns and musical settings ==
Paul Gerhardt paraphrased Psalm 85 in a hymn, "Herr, der du vormals hast dein Land", which is part of the Protestant German hymnal Evangelisches Gesangbuch as EG 283.

Heinrich Schütz set a German metred version in the Becker Psalter, published in 1628, Herr, der du vormals gnädig warst (Lord, you who were merciful before), SWV 182.

In 1681/2, Marc-Antoine Charpentier composed a « Benedixisti Domine », H.181, for 3 voices, 2 treble instruments and continuo.

Themes from verses 9 to 11 were paraphrased in "The Lord will come and not be slow", a hymn by John Milton.

== The Four Virtues ==
In verse 10 in the KJV, virtues are described as meeting: "Mercy and truth are met together; righteousness and peace have kissed each other", in erotic imagery, which became a popular theme for artworks from the Middle Ages through the 18th century. These include paintings by Tiepolo, Lanfranco, Pompeo Batoni, Nicolas Prévost, and Laurent de La Hyre. In 2003, American artist John August Swanson produced the work Psalm 85. The verse was also engraved on a papal tiara which Napoleon gave to Pope Pius VII.

The four virtues, Mercy, Truth, Righteousness (or Justice), and Peace, are allegorized as Four Daughters of God. The psalm has also been quoted in nonviolent movements, for example in a 1993 document of Catholic bishops in the United States, for its verse "for he will speak peace unto his people".

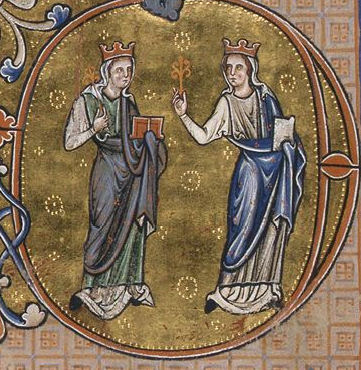
Mercy and Truth, 13th century

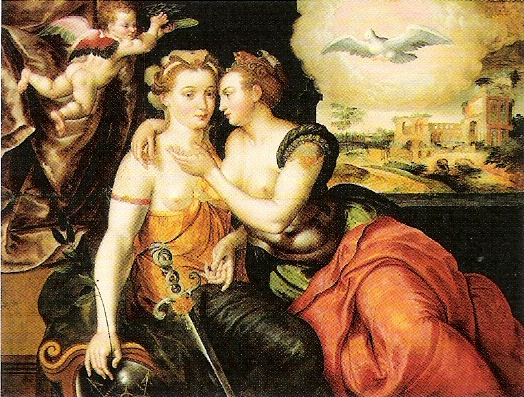
Der Kuß von Gerechtigkeit und Friede, Antwerp, c. 1580

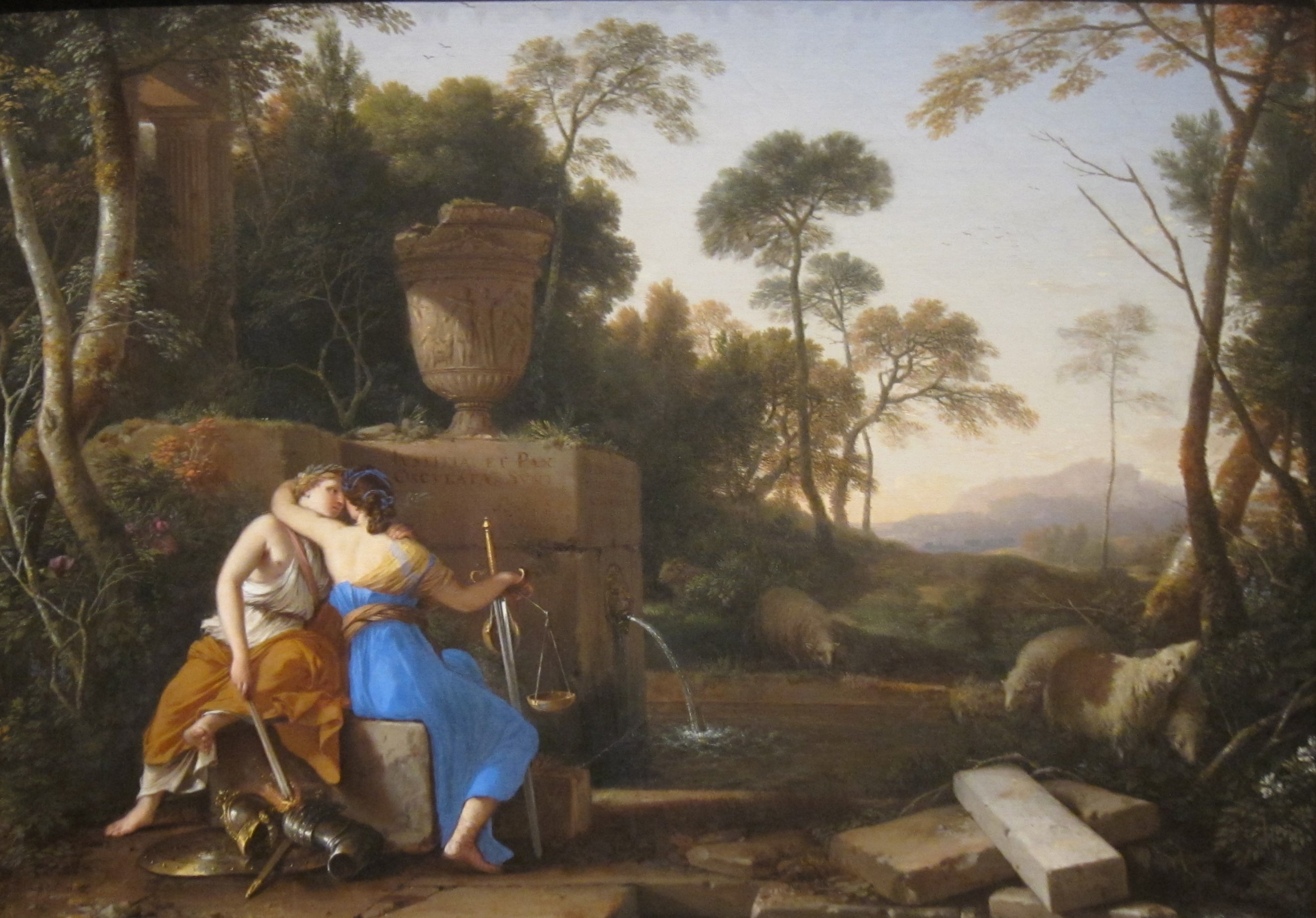
The Kiss of Peace and Justice by Laurent de La Hyre, 1654

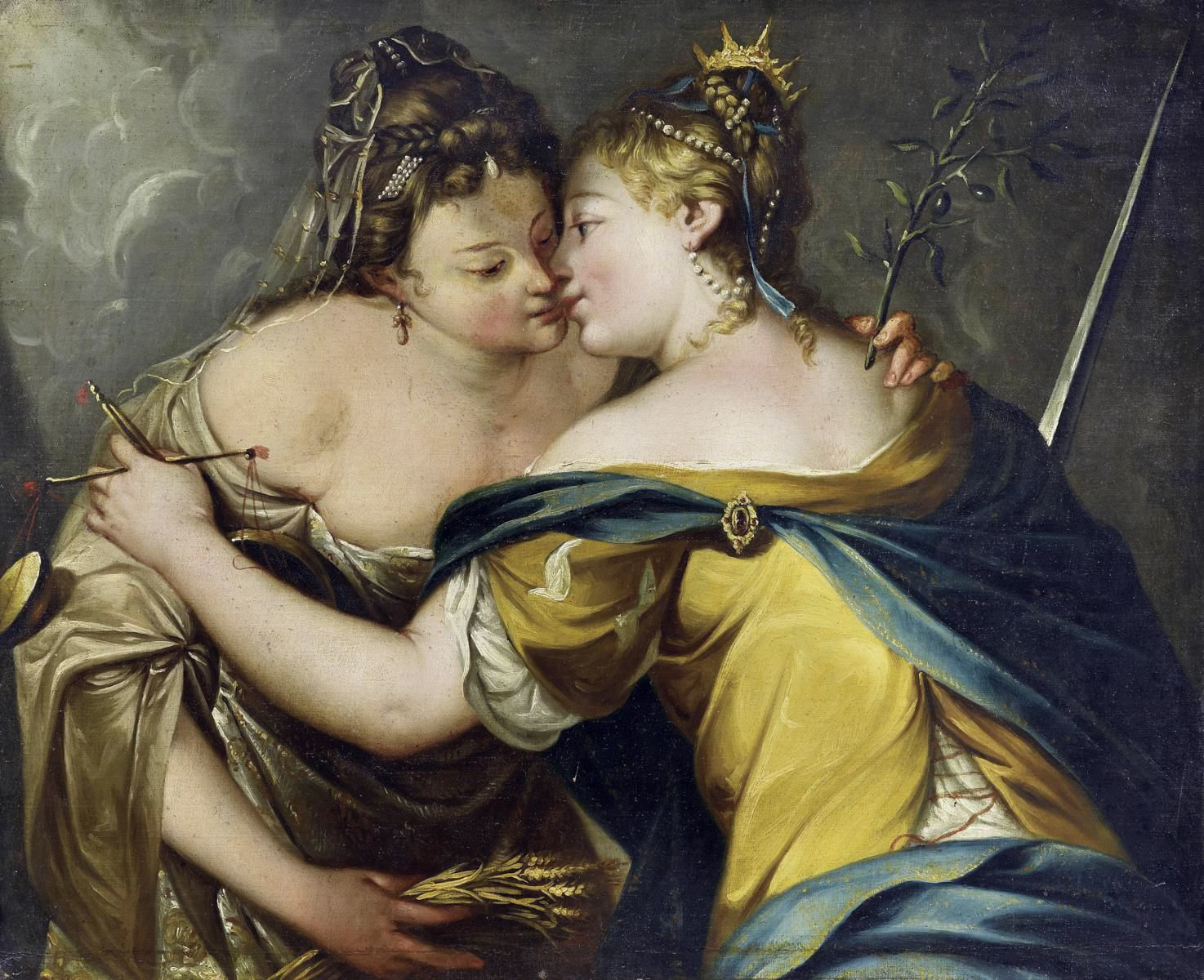
Justice and Peace by Tiepolo, 18th century

== Text ==
The following table shows the Hebrew text of the Psalm with vowels, alongside the Koine Greek text in the Septuagint and the English translation from the King James Version. Note that the meaning can slightly differ between these versions, as the Septuagint and the Masoretic Text come from different textual traditions. (Note: A 1917 translation directly from Hebrew to English by the Jewish Publication Society can be found here or here, and an 1844 translation directly from the Septuagint by L. C. L. Brenton can be found here. Both translations are in the public domain.) In the Septuagint, this psalm is numbered Psalm 84.

#	Hebrew	English	Greek
(Note: In the Jewish verse numbering, the ascription of this psalm is verse 1, and the rest of the psalm begins from verse 2. However, the Christian verse numbering does not count the ascription.)	לַמְנַצֵּ֬חַ ׀ לִבְנֵי־קֹ֬רַח מִזְמֽוֹר׃	(To the chief Musician, A Psalm for the sons of Korah.)	Εἰς τὸ τέλος· τοῖς υἱοῖς Κορὲ ψαλμός. -
1	רָצִ֣יתָ יְהֹוָ֣ה אַרְצֶ֑ךָ שַׁ֝֗בְתָּ (שבות) [שְׁבִ֣ית] יַעֲקֹֽב׃	LORD, thou hast been favourable unto thy land: thou hast brought back the captivity of Jacob.	ΕΥΔΟΚΗΣΑΣ, Κύριε, τὴν γῆν σου, ἀπέστρεψας τὴν αἰχμαλωσίαν ᾿Ιακώβ·
2	נָ֭שָׂאתָ עֲוֺ֣ן עַמֶּ֑ךָ כִּסִּ֖יתָ כׇל־חַטָּאתָ֣ם סֶֽלָה׃	Thou hast forgiven the iniquity of thy people, thou hast covered all their sin. Selah.	ἀφῆκας τὰς ἀνομίας τῷ λαῷ σου, ἐκάλυψας πάσας τὰς ἁμαρτίας αὐτῶν. (διάψαλμα).
3	אָסַ֥פְתָּ כׇל־עֶבְרָתֶ֑ךָ הֱ֝שִׁיב֗וֹתָ מֵחֲר֥וֹן אַפֶּֽךָ׃	Thou hast taken away all thy wrath: thou hast turned thyself from the fierceness of thine anger.	κατέπαυσας πᾶσαν τὴν ὀργήν σου, ἀπέστρεψας ἀπὸ ὀργῆς θυμοῦ σου.
4	שׁ֭וּבֵנוּ אֱלֹהֵ֣י יִשְׁעֵ֑נוּ וְהָפֵ֖ר כַּעַסְךָ֣ עִמָּֽנוּ׃	Turn us, O God of our salvation, and cause thine anger toward us to cease.	ἐπίστρεψον ἡμᾶς, ὁ Θεὸς τῶν σωτηρίων ἡμῶν, καὶ ἀπόστρεψον τὸν θυμόν σου ἀφ᾿ ἡμῶν.
5	הַלְעוֹלָ֥ם תֶּאֱנַף־בָּ֑נוּ תִּמְשֹׁ֥ךְ אַ֝פְּךָ֗ לְדֹ֣ר וָדֹֽר׃	Wilt thou be angry with us for ever? wilt thou draw out thine anger to all generations?	μὴ εἰς τοὺς αἰῶνας ὀργισθῇς ἡμῖν; ἢ διατενεῖς τὴν ὀργήν σου ἀπὸ γενεᾶς εἰς γενεάν;
6	הֲֽלֹא־אַ֭תָּה תָּשׁ֣וּב תְּחַיֵּ֑נוּ וְ֝עַמְּךָ֗ יִשְׂמְחוּ־בָֽךְ׃	Wilt thou not revive us again: that thy people may rejoice in thee?	ὁ Θεός, σὺ ἐπιστρέψας ζωώσεις ἡμᾶς, καὶ ὁ λαός σου εὐφρανθήσεται ἐπὶ σοί.
7	הַרְאֵ֣נוּ יְהֹוָ֣ה חַסְדֶּ֑ךָ וְ֝יֶשְׁעֲךָ֗ תִּתֶּן־לָֽנוּ׃	Shew us thy mercy, O LORD, and grant us thy salvation.	δεῖξον ἡμῖν, Κύριε, τὸ ἔλεός σου καὶ τὸ σωτήριόν σου δῴης ἡμῖν.
8	אֶשְׁמְעָ֗ה מַה־יְדַבֵּר֮ הָאֵ֢ל ׀ יְ֫הֹוָ֥ה כִּ֤י ׀ יְדַבֵּ֬ר שָׁל֗וֹם אֶל־עַמּ֥וֹ וְאֶל־חֲסִידָ֑יו וְאַל־יָשׁ֥וּבוּ לְכִסְלָֽה׃	I will hear what God the LORD will speak: for he will speak peace unto his people, and to his saints: but let them not turn again to folly.	ἀκούσομαι τί λαλήσει ἐν ἐμοὶ Κύριος ὁ Θεός, ὅτι λαλήσει εἰρήνην ἐπὶ τὸν λαὸν αὐτοῦ καὶ ἐπὶ τοὺς ὁσίους αὐτοῦ καὶ ἐπὶ τοὺς ἐπιστρέφοντας καρδίαν ἐπ᾿ αὐτόν.
9	אַ֤ךְ קָר֣וֹב לִירֵאָ֣יו יִשְׁע֑וֹ לִשְׁכֹּ֖ן כָּב֣וֹד בְּאַרְצֵֽנוּ׃	Surely his salvation is nigh them that fear him; that glory may dwell in our land.	πλὴν ἐγγὺς τῶν φοβουμένων αὐτὸν τὸ σωτήριον αὐτοῦ τοῦ κατασκηνῶσαι δόξαν ἐν τῇ γῇ ἡμῶν.
10	חֶסֶד־וֶאֱמֶ֥ת נִפְגָּ֑שׁוּ צֶ֖דֶק וְשָׁל֣וֹם נָשָֽׁקוּ׃	Mercy and truth are met together; righteousness and peace have kissed each other.	ἔλεος καὶ ἀλήθεια συνήντησαν, δικαιοσύνη καὶ εἰρήνη κατεφίλησαν·
11	אֱ֭מֶת מֵאֶ֣רֶץ תִּצְמָ֑ח וְ֝צֶ֗דֶק מִשָּׁמַ֥יִם נִשְׁקָֽף׃	Truth shall spring out of the earth; and righteousness shall look down from heaven.	ἀλήθεια ἐκ τῆς γῆς ἀνέτειλε, καὶ δικαιοσύνη ἐκ τοῦ οὐρανοῦ διέκυψε.
12	גַּם־יְ֭הֹוָה יִתֵּ֣ן הַטּ֑וֹב וְ֝אַרְצֵ֗נוּ תִּתֵּ֥ן יְבוּלָֽהּ׃	Yea, the LORD shall give that which is good; and our land shall yield her increase.	καὶ γὰρ ὁ Κύριος δώσει χρηστότητα, καὶ ἡ γῆ ἡμῶν δώσει τὸν καρπὸν αὐτῆς·
13	צֶ֭דֶק לְפָנָ֣יו יְהַלֵּ֑ךְ וְיָשֵׂ֖ם לְדֶ֣רֶךְ פְּעָמָֽיו׃	Righteousness shall go before him; and shall set us in the way of his steps.	δικαιοσύνη ἐναντίον αὐτοῦ προπορεύσεται καὶ θήσει εἰς ὁδὸν τὰ διαβήματα αὐτοῦ.
