= Heman the Ezrahite =

Author of part of the Hebrew Bible

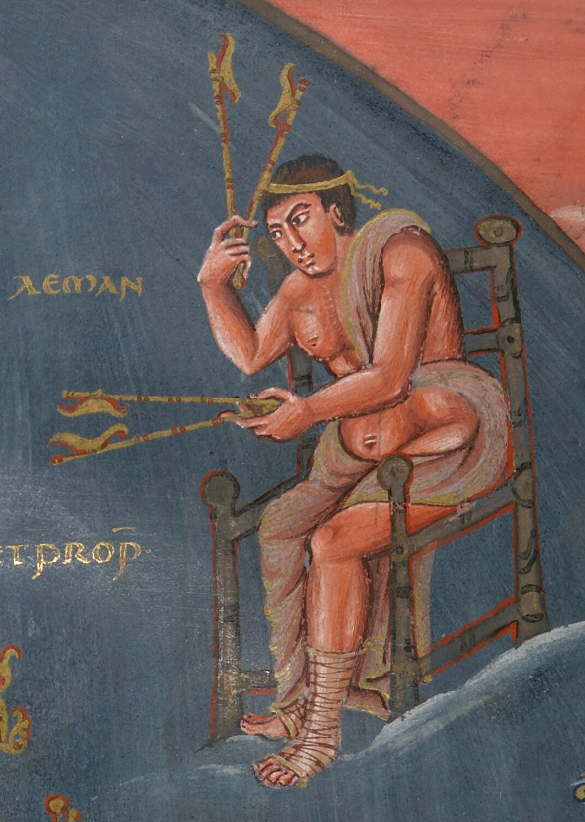
Aeman, also called Heman, from the Vivian Bible, circa 845, Carolingian Empire.

Heman the Ezrahite (Hebrew: הֵימָן הָאֶזְרָחִי Hēmān hā’Ezrāḥī) is the author of Psalm 88 in the Hebrew Bible, according to the Psalm's colophon.

B. Bava Batra connects the name Heman to the semitic root אמנ (ʔ-m-n) meaning "trusted", while CYDA speculates it is from נתן (n-t-n) and means "given". It is found sixteen times in the New International Version of the Bible. The ethnonym is sometimes understood to mean "of Zerah", with the aleph prosthetic, to mean "of Ezrah", or alternatively "the native", who founded a tradition of bards.

Heman the Ezrahite may be one of the three Levites assigned by King David to be ministers of music. This Heman was a grandson of Samuel the prophet. Heman is mentioned as "the king's seer in the words of God" and as father to fourteen sons and three daughters.

== Works ==
Psalm 88 seems to have been written in a state of despair. According to Martin Marty, a professor of church history at the University of Chicago, Psalm 88 is “a wintry landscape of unrelieved bleakness”.

Nevertheless, the appeal to God in Psalm 88 begins with the following expression of faith: "O Yahweh, God of my salvation!" Three times (vss. 1, 9, and 13) the psalmist calls on the name of Yahweh. The psalmist accompanies each invocation with a reference to his perseverance in prayer. For example, in verse nine he declares, "I call on you, O Yahweh, every day".

== In literature ==
Madeleine L'Engle, in her collection A Cry Like a Bell, wrote a poem called "Herman the Ezragite: Psalm 88:18". In it, she imagines the feelings of Heman (Herman) that led him to write Psalm 88.

== See also ==
- Ethan (biblical figure)
