= Sons of Korah (band) =

Australian Christian music band

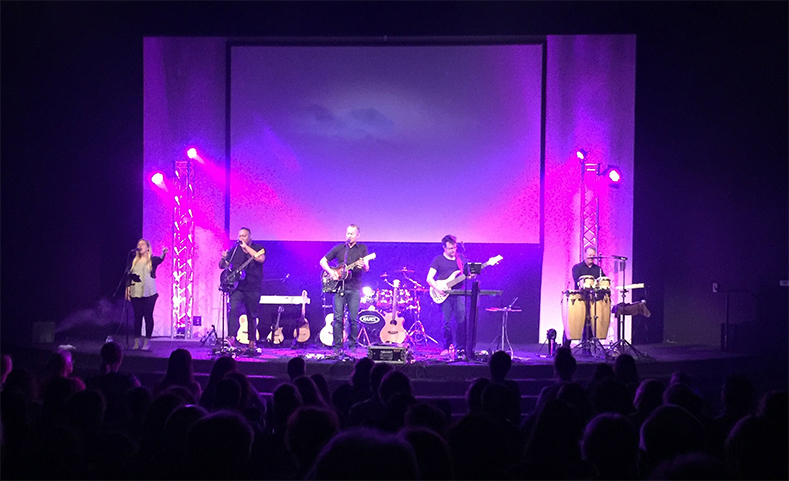
- Sons of Korah performing in 2017

Background information
- Origin: Geelong, Victoria, Australia
- Genres: Acoustic; Folk; CCM; Christian rock; Latin
- Years active: 1994–present
- Labels: Mustard; Wordsong Artists; 5ive
- Members: Matthew Jacoby; Mike (Spike) Avery; Mike Follent; Rod Wilson; Anna Waters
- Past members: Richard Beechey; Jason Coghill; Marcus Hayden; Jayden Lee; Mike McCarthy; Ann-Maree Keefe; Rod Gear; Bruce Walker
- Website: sonsofkorah.com

Sons of Korah are an Australian Christian band founded in 1994 in Geelong. The band's name references the Old Testament family of that name. The group put Psalms to music, using them as lyrics, almost verbatim. As of 2014, the band has interpreted over 50 of the 150 Psalms into songs including, notably, the Psalms' theme of longing for justice. Founding mainstay, Matthew Jacoby (lead vocals, guitar) explained, "The Psalms are important today because we tend to romanticise spirituality a lot and these songs present biblical spirituality in its original form, very real and yet present in such stunning poetic form. It is a perfect blend of spiritual realism with aesthetic and artistic integrity."

== History ==
Sons of Korah were formed in 1994 while founding members Matthew Jacoby, Jason Coghill and Rod Gear attended the Reformed Theological College in Geelong. In 1996 the band recorded their first album Hand to the Plough. After this release, Coghill left the band, however he returned briefly to help record their second album, Light of Life in 1998, which was issued via Mustard Records. It was recorded live-in-the-studio on analogue reel-to-reel. Karen and Paul Gallagher of EvangelNow! (The Online magazine of the Assemblies of God in Australia) observed, "There is a warm, folk feel to this album that both stirs and soothes the soul. Encouraging listening."

As a solo artist, Coghill continued to record music based on the Psalms. Redemption Songs, Sons of Korah's third album, was released in November 2000. For that album the line-up was Coghill on backing vocals; Gear on double bass, bass guitar, lead guitar, piano, solo nylon guitar, backing vocals and cello; Jacoby on lead vocals and guitar; together with Richard Beechey on drums and percussion; and Marcus Hayden on backing vocals.

2001 saw the release of a box set of their recorded albums. The box set included a re-recorded EP version of their first album Hand to the Plough. In 2002 Hayden left the band to pursue a solo career. Jayden Lee joined in 2004 and helped write many of the songs for their next album, Resurrection. Gear did not participate in its or the subsequent tour, while he worked on his solo album. Lee left the band in 2008 and moved to the United States. Mike McCarthy then joined as the group's lead guitarist. Gear also returned to the band after recording his solo album, Barak. After appearing on Ressurrection and Rain as a backing vocalist, Ann-Maree Keefe joined Sons of Korah on tour and often opened their concerts as a solo artist.

Rain, their sixth album, was released in 2008. Justin Michael for Sight Magazine commented on the "amount of light and shade" in the album, while William Chong called it "An enthralling musical journey through some of the Bible's most enduring psalms." Cross Rhythms' Andrew Coe rated it at 9-out-of-10, and explained, "Using the words of the psalms pretty much as they are, rather than simply as an inspiration, is a bold move and really focuses the listener on the Scripture. Rain is a beautiful album which will have you reaching for your Bible." Bruce Walker joined the band after the release of Rain, replacing McCarthy as the group's lead guitarist. In May 2008 four of their albums were listed in the top 10 sold for a week by American retail chain's Family Christian Stores, Resurrection (No. 2), Shelter (No. 4), Light of Life (No. 6) and Redemption Songs (No. 7).

The band's next album Wait was released in 2011 and they appeared on ABC Radio National's The Rhythm Divine promoting it. On a few occasions past members of the band have had a chance to join again on stage. In 2012, Hayden played a few songs at a concert in Melbourne. Lee also played with the band again while they toured the United States in 2013. Refuge was released in 2014. In 2016 Anna Waters replaced Keefe as backing vocalist while Keefe pursued a solo career. Fractures is their newest album released in February 2017. Sons of Korah regularly toured Australia, appearing at Christian festivals: Easterfest and Black Stump. They also toured the United Kingdom, The Netherlands and the United States. In the UK they performed on BBC Radio York shows to support their tours.

== Members ==
- Jason Coghill – drums, backing vocals
- Rod Gear – double bass, lead guitar, solo nylon guitar, backing vocals, cello, keyboards, piano
- Matthew Jacoby – lead vocals, guitar, backing vocals
- Richard Beechey – drums, percussion
- Marcus Hayden – backing vocals
- Mike Avery – acoustic bass guitar, sampling, programming, sound design, keyboards
- Jayden Lee – acoustic fretless guitar, guitar, mandolin, nylon guitar, piano accordion, resonator guitar, backing vocals, lead vocals
- Rod Wilson – drums, percussion
- Mike McCarthy – resonator guitar, mandolin
- Ann-Maree Keefe – backing vocals
- Anna Waters - backing vocals

== Discography ==
=== Studio albums ===
- Hand to the Plough (1996) – (Limited Independent release)
- Light of Life (May 1999) – (Mustard Records/Wordsong Artists) (MRCD002)
  - Light of Life: 20th Anniversary Re-Release (2014) – (Wordsong Artists)
- Redemption Songs (November 2000) – (Wordsong Artists) (WACD001)
- Shelter (November 2002) – (Wordsong Artists) (WACD002)
- Resurrection (March 2005) – (Wordsong Artists) (WACD003)
- Rain (August 2008) – (Wordsong Artists) (WACD006)
- Wait (2011) – (Wordsong Artists) (WACD009)
- Refuge (2014) – (5ive) (WACD011)
- Fractures (25 March 2017) – (5ive) (WACD012)
- Man of Sorrows (2023) – (WACD013)

=== Extended plays ===
- Hand to the Plough – (Wordsong Artists, 2001) (WACD001HP)

=== Live albums ===
- Live Recordings Vol.1 (Wordsong Artists, 2010)
- Live Recordings Vol.2 (Wordsong Artists, 2013)

=== Video albums ===
- Sons of Korah: Live (Wordsong Artists, 2010)
- Sons of Korah: Live in the Netherlands (Wordsong Artists, 2013)
