= Christoph Staude =

German composer

Christoph Staude (born 30 September 1965) is a German composer.

== Life ==
Born in Munich, Staude studied 1984–86 at the University of the Arts with Witold Szalonek and in 1986–91 at the Frankfurt University of Music and Performing Arts with Rolf Riehm and Bernhard Kontarsky. Since 1995, he lives as a freelance composer at the Raketenstation Hombroich near Neuss. There, he initiated the series Hombroich: New Music in 1997. He received commissions and radio productions from SWR Baden-Baden for the Donaueschinger Musiktage, WDR Cologne for the Wittener Tage für neue Kammermusik, HR Frankfurt, SDR Stuttgart, BR Munich and the AUDI-AG-Kulturfond, Ingolstadt.

== Honours ==
- 1992 Stipendienaufenthalt im Deutschen Studienzentrum Venedig
- 1986/87 Preisträger beim Wettbewerb der Landeshauptstadt Stuttgart für junge Komponisten
- 1987 1. Preis beim Kompositionswettbewerb des International Center of New Music Sources (ICONS), Turin
- 1988 Preisträger beim Kompositionswettbewerb des Trio Basso Köln; 2. Preis beim Wettbewerb der Landeshauptstadt Stuttgart
- 1999 2. Preis beim Kompositionswettbewerb der musik-theater-werkstatt am Hessisches Staatstheater Wiesbaden
- 2003 Preisträger im internationalen Kompositionswettbewerb der Elisabeth-Schneider-Stiftung Freiburg
- 2005 Förderpreis des Berliner Kunstpreis

== Compositions ==
Stage music

- Wir. Music theatre piece, libretto: Hans-Georg Wegner (after the eponymous novel by Yevgeny Zamyatin). Premiere 2006 Munich (Munich Biennale)

Orchestral work

- Anangke (1985). 2nd symphonic fragment
- Schacht (1986). 3rd symphonic fragment
- 3 Noirailles (1993)
- Areal, Landschaft für Klavier und Orchester (1997). Premiere 2002 Munich, Münchner Philharmoniker, Ltg. G. Schmöhe, Jan Philip Schulze, piano
- Kohinoor, Skizze zur Reise des Simurgh (2004/05). Premiere 2005 Saarbrücken, Deutsche Radio Philharmonie Saarbrücken Kaiserslautern, Ltg. P. Marchbank

Vocal compositions

- Psalm 88 (1986) for three-part mixed choir and orchestra
- Le Livre des Météores, Szenarium in 7 Installationen (1989/90) für Sopran, Bariton und Orchester
- Trifoglio (2000) for alto voice and string quartet. Text: Yagi Jūkichi, Osip Mandelstam, Tsangyang Gyatso
- Kodex (2001) for soprano and 7 instrumentalists (text from the Nuremberg Code des IPPNW, 1947). UA Nürnberg (Pegnitzschäfer-Klangkonzepte)
- Seven last words (2004) for soprano and piano after James Joyce
- Eines Schattens Traum (2008) for choir and orchestra

Chamber music

- Eisharmonie (1985) for two pianos to twelve hands
- Nachbild for viola solo (1986)
- Streichquartett I (1986). Premiere Turin, Arditti Quartet
- Befund. Streichquartett II (1988)
- All’aperto. 18 Scherben (Streichquartett III) (1992)
- Fundament (1999). Fragment for organ
- Per speculum in aenigmate (1999) for clarinet, violin, violoncello and piano
- Interior Zone (2002) for Ensemble. Premiere Hombroich, ensemble recherche
- Streichquartett VI (2003)

Releases on CD

- Nachbild for viola solo (1986); Intersound GmbH München ISPV163CD, Eckart Schloifer, Vla.
- Obduktion (1988) for saxophone solo; New Saxophone Chamber Music WWE 1CD 31890 col legno, Johannes Ernst, Sax.
- Morpheus, Tanz/-Szene für 6 Schlagzeuger (1990); Donaueschinger Musiktage 1990, col legno AU 31819
- Intercut / Zwischenschnitt. Fünfzehn Fundstücke für Sextett (1999). Dokumentation Wittener Tage für neue Kammermusik 1999

Staude-Porträt-CD Edition Zeitgenössische Musik (Deutscher Musikrat) Wergo-6546-2 (2000)
