= Psalm 89 =

Biblical psalm

- "I will sing of the mercies of the LORD for ever"
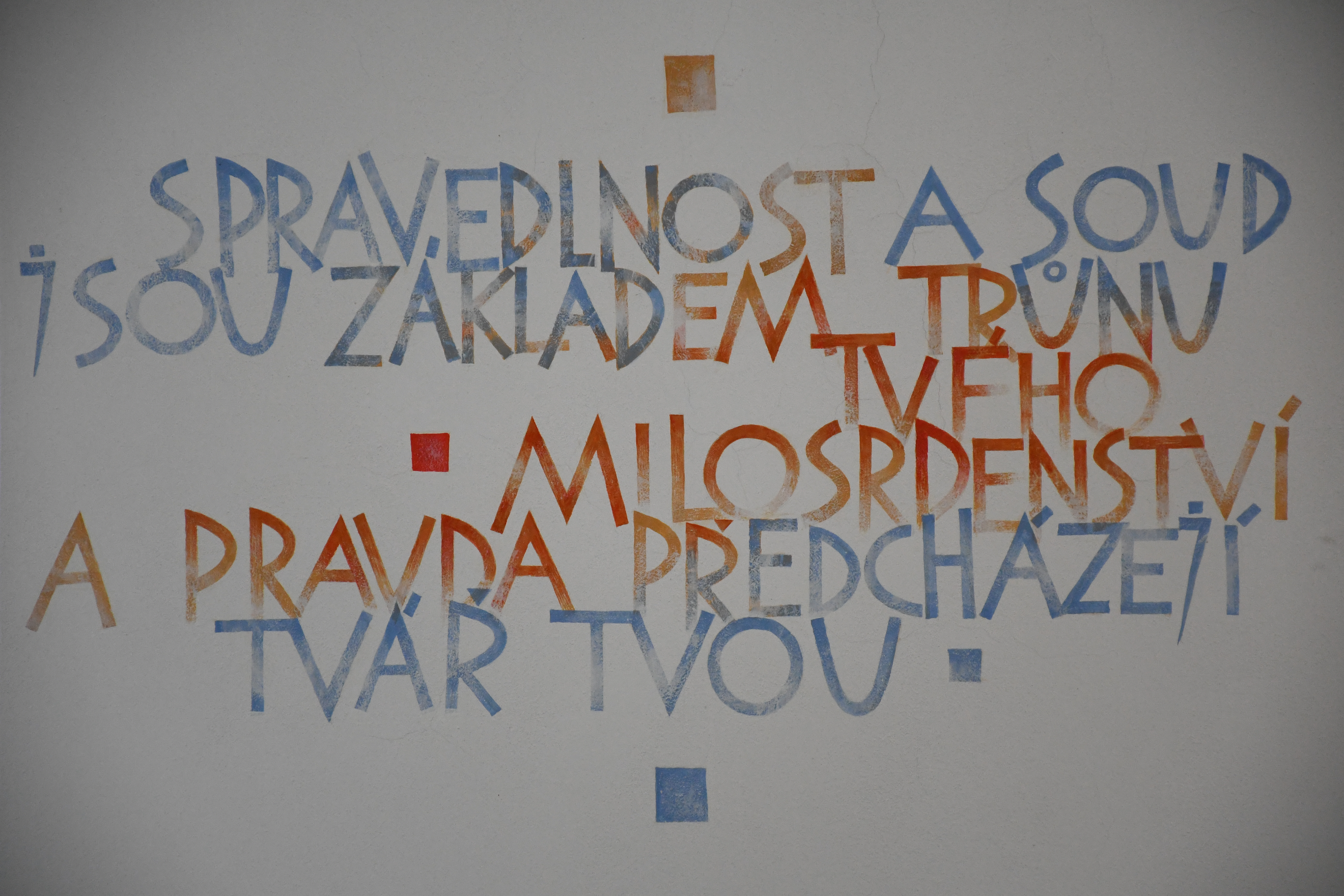
- Czech inscription of Psalm 89:14 at the Evangelical Church of Czech Brethren in Brno-Husovice. "Justice and judgment are the habitation of thy throne: mercy and truth shall go before thy face." (KJV)
- Other name: Psalm 88; "Misericordias Domini in aeternum cantabo"
- Written: by Ethan the Ezrahite
- Language: Hebrew (original)

Psalm 89
- ← Psalm 88 Psalm 90 →
- Book: Book of Psalms
- Hebrew Bible part: Ketuvim
- Order in the Hebrew part: 1
- Category: Sifrei Emet
- Christian Bible part: Old Testament
- Order in the Christian part: 19

Psalm 89 is the 89th psalm of the Book of Psalms, beginning in English in the King James Version: "I will sing of the mercies of the LORD for ever". In the slightly different numbering system used in the Greek Septuagint and Latin Vulgate translations of the Bible, this psalm is Psalm 88. In Latin, it is known as "Misericordias Domini in aeternum cantabo". It is described as a maschil or "contemplation".

The psalm forms a regular part of Jewish, Catholic liturgies. It has been set to music, for example by Baroque composer Heinrich Schütz in German.

== Analysis ==
The superscription of the psalm states that it was written by Ethan the Ezrahite, who, along with Heman the Ezrahite (to whom Psalm 88 is attributed), was a wise man from the time of, or prior to, King Solomon. 1 Kings 4:31 states that Solomon "was wiser than all other men, wiser than Ethan the Ezrahite, and Heman, Calcol, and Darda, the sons of Mahol, and his fame was in all the surrounding nations" (ESV).

In 2 Samuel 7:12–17, God promises King David that there will always be a king from his line to rule over Israel. Some scholars claim that this psalm was written after the deportation of the Jews to Babylon. However, this claim is inconsistent with the dating of Ethan to the time of Solomon. More likely is that it was written on behalf of the king (David or Solomon) during a time of trouble. The author expresses his belief that the promises outlined in 2 Samuel 7:12–17 will be fulfilled.

Charles Spurgeon called this psalm a Covenant Psalm and described it as "the utterance of a believer". It begins with words of praise for Yahweh's goodness and covenant faithfulness. For the first 37 verses, the psalm recounts the promises made to King David and the covenant established by God with him; from verse 38 to 51, the psalmist laments what seems to him like God's lack of remembrance of his covenant promises.

== Uses ==
=== New Testament ===
In the New Testament, part of verse 10 is quoted in Luke 1:51, and verse 20 is quoted in Acts 13:22.

=== Judaism ===
- This psalm is recited during Selichot in some traditions.
- Verse 53 is the first verse of Baruch Hashem L'Olam in Pesukei Dezimra and Baruch Hashem L'Olam after the Shema in weekday Maariv.
- Verses 16–18 are recited following the Shofar blowing on Rosh Hashanah.

=== Eastern Orthodox Church ===
In the Eastern Orthodox Church, Psalm 88 (Psalm 89 in the Masoretic Text) is part of the twelfth Kathisma division of the Psalter, read at Vespers on Wednesday evenings, as well as on Tuesdays and Thursdays during Lent, at Matins and the Ninth Hour, respectively.

=== Book of Common Prayer ===
In the Church of England's Book of Common Prayer, this psalm is appointed to be read in the evening of the 17th day of the month, as well as at Evensong on Christmas Day.

== Musical settings ==
Heinrich Schütz set Psalm 90 in a metred version in German as part of the Becker Psalter, first published in 1628. It is split in two parts, "Ich will von Gnade singen" and "Ach Gott, warum verstößt du nun", SWV 186 and 1878. Alan Hovhaness set the text to music in his Op. 27, a choral work O Lord God of Hosts.

Menachem Creditor composed Olam Chesed Yibaneh/A World of Love (2001), with three words from Psalm 89:3. Haaretz called it the anthem of Jewish resistance to the Unite the Right rally.

== Text ==
The following table shows the Hebrew text of the Psalm with vowels, alongside the Koine Greek text in the Septuagint and the English translation from the King James Version. Note that the meaning can slightly differ between these versions, as the Septuagint and the Masoretic Text come from different textual traditions. (Note: A 1917 translation directly from Hebrew to English by the Jewish Publication Society can be found here or here, and an 1844 translation directly from the Septuagint by L. C. L. Brenton can be found here. Both translations are in the public domain.) In the Septuagint, this psalm is numbered Psalm 88.

#	Hebrew	English	Greek
(Note: In the Jewish verse numbering, the ascription of this psalm is verse 1, and the rest of the psalm begins from verse 2. However, the Christian verse numbering does not count the ascription.)	מַ֝שְׂכִּ֗יל לְאֵיתָ֥ן הָאֶזְרָחִֽי׃	(Maschil of Ethan the Ezrahite.)	Συνέσεως Αἰθὰν τῷ ᾿Ισραηλίτῃ. -
1	חַֽסְדֵ֣י יְ֭הֹוָה עוֹלָ֣ם אָשִׁ֑ירָה לְדֹ֥ר וָדֹ֓ר ׀ אוֹדִ֖יעַ אֱמוּנָתְךָ֣ בְּפִֽי׃	I will sing of the mercies of the LORD for ever: with my mouth will I make known thy faithfulness to all generations.	ΤΑ ΕΛΕΗ σου, Κύριε, εἰς τὸν αἰῶνα ᾄσομαι, εἰς γενεὰν καὶ γενεὰν ἀπαγγελῶ τὴν ἀλήθειάν σου ἐν τῷ στόματί μου,
2	כִּֽי־אָמַ֗רְתִּי ע֭וֹלָם חֶ֣סֶד יִבָּנֶ֑ה שָׁמַ֓יִם ׀ תָּכִ֖ן אֱמוּנָתְךָ֣ בָהֶֽם׃	For I have said, Mercy shall be built up for ever: thy faithfulness shalt thou establish in the very heavens.	ὅτι εἶπας· εἰς τὸν αἰῶνα ἔλεος οἰκοδομηθήσεται· ἐν τοῖς οὐρανοῖς ἑτοιμασθήσεται ἡ ἀλήθειά σου·
3	כָּרַ֣תִּי בְ֭רִית לִבְחִירִ֑י נִ֝שְׁבַּ֗עְתִּי לְדָוִ֥ד עַבְדִּֽי׃	I have made a covenant with my chosen, I have sworn unto David my servant,	διεθέμην διαθήκην τοῖς ἐκλεκτοῖς μου, ὤμοσα Δαυΐδ τῷ δούλῳ μου·
4	עַד־ע֭וֹלָם אָכִ֣ין זַרְעֶ֑ךָ וּבָנִ֨יתִי לְדֹר־וָד֖וֹר כִּסְאֲךָ֣ סֶֽלָה׃	Thy seed will I establish for ever, and build up thy throne to all generations. Selah.	ἕως τοῦ αἰῶνος ἑτοιμάσω τὸ σπέρμα σου καὶ οἰκοδομήσω εἰς γενεὰν καὶ γενεὰν τὸν θρόνον σου. (διάψαλμα).
5	וְי֘וֹד֤וּ שָׁמַ֣יִם פִּלְאֲךָ֣ יְהֹוָ֑ה אַף־אֱ֝מ֥וּנָתְךָ֗ בִּקְהַ֥ל קְדֹשִֽׁים׃	And the heavens shall praise thy wonders, O LORD: thy faithfulness also in the congregation of the saints.	ἐξομολογήσονται οἱ οὐρανοὶ τὰ θαυμάσιά σου, Κύριε, καὶ τὴν ἀλήθειάν σου ἐν ἐκκλησίᾳ ἁγίων.
6	כִּ֤י מִ֣י בַ֭שַּׁחַק יַעֲרֹ֣ךְ לַיהֹוָ֑ה יִדְמֶ֥ה לַ֝יהֹוָ֗ה בִּבְנֵ֥י אֵלִֽים׃	For who in the heaven can be compared unto the LORD? who among the sons of the mighty can be likened unto the LORD?	ὅτι τίς ἐν νεφέλαις ἰσωθήσεται τῷ Κυρίῳ; καὶ τίς ὁμοιωθήσεται τῷ Κυρίῳ ἐν υἱοῖς Θεοῦ;
7	אֵ֣ל נַ֭עֲרָץ בְּסוֹד־קְדֹשִׁ֣ים רַבָּ֑ה וְ֝נוֹרָ֗א עַל־כׇּל־סְבִיבָֽיו׃	God is greatly to be feared in the assembly of the saints, and to be had in reverence of all them that are about him.	ὁ Θεὸς ἐνδοξαζόμενος ἐν βουλῇ ἁγίων, μέγας καὶ φοβερὸς ἐπὶ πάντας τοὺς περικύκλῳ αὐτοῦ.
8	יְהֹוָ֤ה ׀ אֱלֹ֘הֵ֤י צְבָא֗וֹת מִֽי־כָמ֖וֹךָֽ חֲסִ֥ין ׀ יָ֑הּ וֶ֝אֱמ֥וּנָתְךָ֗ סְבִיבוֹתֶֽיךָ׃	O LORD God of hosts, who is a strong LORD like unto thee? or to thy faithfulness round about thee?	Κύριε ὁ Θεὸς τῶν δυνάμεων, τίς ὅμοιός σοι; δυνατὸς εἶ, Κύριε, καὶ ἡ ἀλήθειά σου κύκλῳ σου.
9	אַתָּ֣ה מ֭וֹשֵׁל בְּגֵא֣וּת הַיָּ֑ם בְּשׂ֥וֹא גַ֝לָּ֗יו אַתָּ֥ה תְשַׁבְּחֵֽם׃	Thou rulest the raging of the sea: when the waves thereof arise, thou stillest them.	σὺ δεσπόζεις τοῦ κράτους τῆς θαλάσσης, τὸν δὲ σάλον τῶν κυμάτων αὐτῆς σὺ καταπραΰνεις.
10	אַתָּ֤ה דִכִּ֣אתָ כֶחָלָ֣ל רָ֑הַב בִּזְר֥וֹעַ עֻ֝זְּךָ֗ פִּזַּ֥רְתָּ אוֹיְבֶֽיךָ׃	Thou hast broken Rahab in pieces, as one that is slain; thou hast scattered thine enemies with thy strong arm.	σὺ ἐταπείνωσας ὡς τραυματίαν ὑπερήφανον, ἐν τῷ βραχίονι τῆς δυνάμεώς σου διεσκόρπισας τοὺς ἐχθρούς σου.
11	לְךָ֣ שָׁ֭מַיִם אַף־לְךָ֥ אָ֑רֶץ תֵּבֵ֥ל וּ֝מְלֹאָ֗הּ אַתָּ֥ה יְסַדְתָּֽם׃	The heavens are thine, the earth also is thine: as for the world and the fulness thereof, thou hast founded them.	σοί εἰσιν οἱ οὐρανοί, καὶ σή ἐστιν ἡ γῆ· τὴν οἰκουμένην καὶ τὸ πλήρωμα αὐτῆς σὺ ἐθεμελίωσας.
12	צָפ֣וֹן וְ֭יָמִין אַתָּ֣ה בְרָאתָ֑ם תָּב֥וֹר וְ֝חֶרְמ֗וֹן בְּשִׁמְךָ֥ יְרַנֵּֽנוּ׃	The north and the south thou hast created them: Tabor and Hermon shall rejoice in thy name.	τὸν βορρᾶν καὶ τὴν θάλασσαν σὺ ἔκτισας, Θαβὼρ καὶ ῾Ερμὼν ἐν τῷ ὀνόματί σου ἀγαλλιάσονται.
13	לְךָ֣ זְ֭רוֹעַ עִם־גְּבוּרָ֑ה תָּעֹ֥ז יָ֝דְךָ֗ תָּר֥וּם יְמִינֶֽךָ׃	Thou hast a mighty arm: strong is thy hand, and high is thy right hand.	σὸς ὁ βραχίων μετὰ δυναστείας· κραταιωθήτω ἡ χείρ σου, ὑψωθήτω ἡ δεξιά σου.
14	צֶ֣דֶק וּ֭מִשְׁפָּט מְכ֣וֹן כִּסְאֶ֑ךָ חֶ֥סֶד וֶ֝אֱמֶ֗ת יְֽקַדְּמ֥וּ פָנֶֽיךָ׃	Justice and judgment are the habitation of thy throne: mercy and truth shall go before thy face.	δικαιοσύνη καὶ κρίμα ἑτοιμασία τοῦ θρόνου σου, ἔλεος καὶ ἀλήθεια προπορεύσονται πρὸ προσώπου σου.
15	אַשְׁרֵ֣י הָ֭עָם יֹדְעֵ֣י תְרוּעָ֑ה יְ֝הֹוָ֗ה בְּֽאוֹר־פָּנֶ֥יךָ יְהַלֵּכֽוּן׃	Blessed is the people that know the joyful sound: they shall walk, O LORD, in the light of thy countenance.	μακάριος ὁ λαὸς ὁ γινώσκων ἀλαλαγμόν· Κύριε, ἐν τῷ φωτὶ τοῦ προσώπου σου πορεύσονται
16	בְּ֭שִׁמְךָ יְגִיל֣וּן כׇּל־הַיּ֑וֹם וּבְצִדְקָתְךָ֥ יָרֽוּמוּ׃	In thy name shall they rejoice all the day: and in thy righteousness shall they be exalted.	καὶ ἐν τῷ ὀνόματί σου ἀγαλλιάσονται ὅλην τὴν ἡμέραν καὶ ἐν τῇ δικαιοσύνῃ σου ὑψωθήσονται.
17	כִּי־תִפְאֶ֣רֶת עֻזָּ֣מוֹ אָ֑תָּה וּ֝בִרְצוֹנְךָ֗ (תרים) [תָּר֥וּם] קַרְנֵֽינוּ׃	For thou art the glory of their strength: and in thy favour our horn shall be exalted.	ὅτι καύχημα τῆς δυνάμεως αὐτῶν σὺ εἶ, καὶ ἐν τῇ εὐδοκίᾳ σου ὑψωθήσεται τὸ κέρας ἡμῶν.
18	כִּ֣י לַ֭יהֹוָה מָגִנֵּ֑נוּ וְלִקְד֖וֹשׁ יִשְׂרָאֵ֣ל מַלְכֵּֽנוּ׃	For the LORD is our defence; and the Holy One of Israel is our king.	ὅτι τοῦ Κυρίου ἡ ἀντίληψις καὶ τοῦ ἁγίου ᾿Ισραὴλ βασιλέως ἡμῶν.
19	אָ֤ז דִּבַּ֥רְתָּֽ־בְחָז֡וֹן לַחֲסִידֶ֗יךָ וַתֹּ֗אמֶר שִׁוִּ֣יתִי עֵ֭זֶר עַל־גִּבּ֑וֹר הֲרִימ֖וֹתִי בָח֣וּר מֵעָֽם׃	Then thou spakest in vision to thy holy one, and saidst, I have laid help upon one that is mighty; I have exalted one chosen out of the people.	τότε ἐλάλησας ἐν ὁράσει τοῖς υἱοῖς σου καὶ εἶπας· ἐθέμην βοήθειαν ἐπὶ δυνατόν, ὕψωσα ἐκλεκτὸν ἐκ τοῦ λαοῦ μου·
20	מָ֭צָאתִי דָּוִ֣ד עַבְדִּ֑י בְּשֶׁ֖מֶן קׇדְשִׁ֣י מְשַׁחְתִּֽיו׃	I have found David my servant; with my holy oil have I anointed him:	εὗρον Δαυΐδ τὸν δοῦλόν μου, ἐν ἐλέει ἁγίῳ μου ἔχρισα αὐτόν.
21	אֲשֶׁ֣ר יָ֭דִי תִּכּ֣וֹן עִמּ֑וֹ אַף־זְרוֹעִ֥י תְאַמְּצֶֽנּוּ׃	With whom my hand shall be established: mine arm also shall strengthen him.	ἡ γὰρ χείρ μου συναντιλήψεται αὐτῷ καὶ ὁ βραχίων μου κατισχύσει αὐτόν·
22	לֹא־יַשִּׁ֣יא אוֹיֵ֣ב בּ֑וֹ וּבֶן־עַ֝וְלָ֗ה לֹ֣א יְעַנֶּֽנּוּ׃	The enemy shall not exact upon him; nor the son of wickedness afflict him.	οὐκ ὠφελήσει ἐχθρὸς ἐν αὐτῷ, καὶ υἱὸς ἀνομίας οὐ προσθήσει τοῦ κακῶσαι αὐτόν.
23	וְכַתּוֹתִ֣י מִפָּנָ֣יו צָרָ֑יו וּמְשַׂנְאָ֥יו אֶגּֽוֹף׃	And I will beat down his foes before his face, and plague them that hate him.	καὶ συγκόψω ἀπὸ προσώπου αὐτοῦ τοὺς ἐχθροὺς αὐτοῦ καὶ τοὺς μισοῦντας αὐτὸν τροπώσομαι.
24	וֶ֥אֱֽמוּנָתִ֣י וְחַסְדִּ֣י עִמּ֑וֹ וּ֝בִשְׁמִ֗י תָּר֥וּם קַרְנֽוֹ׃	But my faithfulness and my mercy shall be with him: and in my name shall his horn be exalted.	καὶ ἡ ἀλήθειά μου καὶ τὸ ἔλεός μου μετ᾿ αὐτοῦ, καὶ ἐν τῷ ὀνόματί μου ὑψωθήσεται τὸ κέρας αὐτοῦ.
25	וְשַׂמְתִּ֣י בַיָּ֣ם יָד֑וֹ וּֽבַנְּהָר֥וֹת יְמִינֽוֹ׃	I will set his hand also in the sea, and his right hand in the rivers.	καὶ θήσομαι ἐν θαλάσσῃ χεῖρα αὐτοῦ καὶ ἐν ποταμοῖς δεξιὰν αὐτοῦ.
26	ה֣וּא יִ֭קְרָאֵנִי אָ֣בִי אָ֑תָּה אֵ֝לִ֗י וְצ֣וּר יְשׁוּעָתִֽי׃	He shall cry unto me, Thou art my father, my God, and the rock of my salvation.	αὐτὸς ἐπικαλέσεταί με· πατήρ μου εἶ σύ, Θεός μου καὶ ἀντιλήπτωρ τῆς σωτηρίας μου·
27	אַף־אָ֭נִי בְּכ֣וֹר אֶתְּנֵ֑הוּ עֶ֝לְי֗וֹן לְמַלְכֵי־אָֽרֶץ׃	Also I will make him my firstborn, higher than the kings of the earth.	κἀγὼ πρωτότοκον θήσομαι αὐτόν, ὑψηλὸν παρὰ τοῖς βασιλεῦσι τῆς γῆς.
28	לְ֭עוֹלָם (אשמור) [אֶשְׁמׇר־]ל֣וֹ חַסְדִּ֑י וּ֝בְרִיתִ֗י נֶאֱמֶ֥נֶת לֽוֹ׃	My mercy will I keep for him for evermore, and my covenant shall stand fast with him.	εἰς τὸν αἰῶνα φυλάξω αὐτῷ τὸ ἔλεός μου, καὶ ἡ διαθήκη μου πιστὴ αὐτῷ·
29	וְשַׂמְתִּ֣י לָעַ֣ד זַרְע֑וֹ וְ֝כִסְא֗וֹ כִּימֵ֥י שָׁמָֽיִם׃	His seed also will I make to endure for ever, and his throne as the days of heaven.	καὶ θήσομαι εἰς τὸν αἰῶνα τοῦ αἰῶνος τὸ σπέρμα αὐτοῦ καὶ τὸν θρόνον αὐτοῦ ὡς τὰς ἡμέρας τοῦ οὐρανοῦ.
30	אִם־יַעַזְב֣וּ בָ֭נָיו תּוֹרָתִ֑י וּ֝בְמִשְׁפָּטַ֗י לֹ֣א יֵלֵכֽוּן׃	If his children forsake my law, and walk not in my judgments;	ἐὰν ἐγκαταλίπωσιν οἱ υἱοὶ αὐτοῦ τὸν νόμον μου καὶ τοῖς κρίμασί μου μὴ πορευθῶσιν,
31	אִם־חֻקֹּתַ֥י יְחַלֵּ֑לוּ וּ֝מִצְוֺתַ֗י לֹ֣א יִשְׁמֹֽרוּ׃	If they break my statutes, and keep not my commandments;	ἐὰν τὰ δικαιώματά μου βεβηλώσωσι καὶ τὰς ἐντολάς μου μὴ φυλάξωσιν,
32	וּפָקַדְתִּ֣י בְשֵׁ֣בֶט פִּשְׁעָ֑ם וּבִנְגָעִ֥ים עֲוֺנָֽם׃	Then will I visit their transgression with the rod, and their iniquity with stripes.	ἐπισκέψομαι ἐν ῥάβδῳ τὰς ἀνομίας αὐτῶν καὶ ἐν μάστιξι τὰς ἀδικίας αὐτῶν·
33	וְ֭חַסְדִּי לֹא־אָפִ֣יר מֵעִמּ֑וֹ וְלֹא־אֲ֝שַׁקֵּ֗ר בֶּאֱמוּנָתִֽי׃	Nevertheless my lovingkindness will I not utterly take from him, nor suffer my faithfulness to fail.	τὸ δὲ ἔλεός μου οὐ μὴ διασκεδάσω ἀπ᾿ αὐτῶν, οὐδ᾿ οὐ μὴ ἀδικήσω ἐν τῇ ἀληθείᾳ μου,
34	לֹֽא־אֲחַלֵּ֥ל בְּרִיתִ֑י וּמוֹצָ֥א שְׂ֝פָתַ֗י לֹ֣א אֲשַׁנֶּֽה׃	My covenant will I not break, nor alter the thing that is gone out of my lips.	οὐδ᾿ οὐ μὴ βεβηλώσω τὴν διαθήκην μου καὶ τὰ ἐκπορευόμενα διὰ τῶν χειλέων μου οὐ μὴ ἀθετήσω.
35	אַ֭חַת נִשְׁבַּ֣עְתִּי בְקׇדְשִׁ֑י אִֽם־לְדָוִ֥ד אֲכַזֵּֽב׃	Once have I sworn by my holiness that I will not lie unto David.	ἅπαξ ὤμοσα ἐν τῷ ἁγίῳ μου, εἰ τῷ Δαυΐδ ψεύσομαι·
36	זַ֭רְעוֹ לְעוֹלָ֣ם יִהְיֶ֑ה וְכִסְא֖וֹ כַשֶּׁ֣מֶשׁ נֶגְדִּֽי׃	His seed shall endure for ever, and his throne as the sun before me.	τὸ σπέρμα αὐτοῦ εἰς τὸν αἰῶνα μενεῖ καὶ ὁ θρόνος αὐτοῦ ὡς ὁ ἥλιος ἐναντίον μου
37	כְּ֭יָרֵחַ יִכּ֣וֹן עוֹלָ֑ם וְעֵ֥ד בַּ֝שַּׁ֗חַק נֶאֱמָ֥ן סֶֽלָה׃	It shall be established for ever as the moon, and as a faithful witness in heaven. Selah.	καὶ ὡς ἡ σελήνη κατηρτισμένη εἰς τὸν αἰῶνα· καὶ ὁ μάρτυς ἐν οὐρανῷ πιστός. (διάψαλμα).
38	וְאַתָּ֣ה זָ֭נַחְתָּ וַתִּמְאָ֑ס הִ֝תְעַבַּ֗רְתָּ עִם־מְשִׁיחֶֽךָ׃	But thou hast cast off and abhorred, thou hast been wroth with thine anointed.	σὺ δὲ ἀπώσω καὶ ἐξουδένωσας, ἀνεβάλου τὸν χριστόν σου·
39	נֵ֭אַרְתָּה בְּרִ֣ית עַבְדֶּ֑ךָ חִלַּ֖לְתָּ לָאָ֣רֶץ נִזְרֽוֹ׃	Thou hast made void the covenant of thy servant: thou hast profaned his crown by casting it to the ground.	κατέστρεψας τὴν διαθήκην τοῦ δούλου σου, ἐβεβήλωσας εἰς τὴν γῆν τὸ ἁγίασμα αὐτοῦ.
40	פָּרַ֥צְתָּ כׇל־גְּדֵרֹתָ֑יו שַׂ֖מְתָּ מִבְצָרָ֣יו מְחִתָּֽה׃	Thou hast broken down all his hedges; thou hast brought his strong holds to ruin.	καθεῖλες πάντας τοὺς φραγμοὺς αὐτοῦ, ἔθου τὰ ὀχυρώματα αὐτοῦ δειλίαν·
41	שַׁ֭סֻּהוּ כׇּל־עֹ֣בְרֵי דָ֑רֶךְ הָיָ֥ה חֶ֝רְפָּ֗ה לִשְׁכֵנָֽיו׃	All that pass by the way spoil him: he is a reproach to his neighbours.	διήρπασαν αὐτὸν πάντες οἱ διοδεύοντες ὁδόν, ἐγενήθη ὄνειδος τοῖς γείτοσιν αὐτοῦ.
42	הֲ֭רִימוֹתָ יְמִ֣ין צָרָ֑יו הִ֝שְׂמַ֗חְתָּ כׇּל־אוֹיְבָֽיו׃	Thou hast set up the right hand of his adversaries; thou hast made all his enemies to rejoice.	ὕψωσας τὴν δεξιὰν τῶν θλιβόντων αὐτόν, εὔφρανας πάντας τοὺς ἐχθροὺς αὐτοῦ.
43	אַף־תָּ֭שִׁיב צ֣וּר חַרְבּ֑וֹ וְלֹ֥א הֲ֝קֵימֹת֗וֹ בַּמִּלְחָמָֽה׃	Thou hast also turned the edge of his sword, and hast not made him to stand in the battle.	ἀπέστρεψας τὴν βοήθειαν τῆς ῥομφαίας αὐτοῦ καὶ οὐκ ἀντελάβου αὐτοῦ ἐν τῷ πολέμῳ.
44	הִשְׁבַּ֥תָּ מִטְּהָר֑וֹ וְ֝כִסְא֗וֹ לָאָ֥רֶץ מִגַּֽרְתָּה׃	Thou hast made his glory to cease, and cast his throne down to the ground.	κατέλυσας ἀπὸ καθαρισμοῦ αὐτοῦ, τὸν θρόνον αὐτοῦ εἰς τὴν γῆν κατέρραξας.
45	הִ֭קְצַרְתָּ יְמֵ֣י עֲלוּמָ֑יו הֶ֥עֱטִ֨יתָ עָלָ֖יו בּוּשָׁ֣ה סֶֽלָה׃	The days of his youth hast thou shortened: thou hast covered him with shame. Selah.	ἐσμίκρυνας τὰς ἡμέρας τοῦ χρόνου αὐτοῦ, κατέχεας αὐτοῦ αἰσχύνην. (διάψαλμα).
46	עַד־מָ֣ה יְ֭הֹוָה תִּסָּתֵ֣ר לָנֶ֑צַח תִּבְעַ֖ר כְּמוֹ־אֵ֣שׁ חֲמָתֶֽךָ׃	How long, LORD? wilt thou hide thyself for ever? shall thy wrath burn like fire?	ἕως πότε, Κύριε, ἀποστρέφῃ εἰς τέλος, ἐκκαυθήσεται ὡς πῦρ ἡ ὀργή σου;
47	זְכׇר־אֲנִ֥י מֶה־חָ֑לֶד עַל־מַה־שָּׁ֝֗וְא בָּרָ֥אתָ כׇל־בְּנֵֽי־אָדָֽם׃	Remember how short my time is: wherefore hast thou made all men in vain?	μνήσθητι τίς μου ἡ ὑπόστασις· μὴ γὰρ ματαίως ἔκτισας πάντας τοὺς υἱοὺς τῶν ἀνθρώπων;
48	מִ֤י גֶ֣בֶר יִֽ֭חְיֶה וְלֹ֣א יִרְאֶה־מָּ֑וֶת יְמַלֵּ֨ט נַפְשׁ֖וֹ מִיַּד־שְׁא֣וֹל סֶֽלָה׃	What man is he that liveth, and shall not see death? shall he deliver his soul from the hand of the grave? Selah.	τίς ἐστιν ἄνθρωπος, ὃς ζήσεται, καὶ οὐκ ὄψεται θάνατον; ῥύσεται τὴν ψυχὴν αὐτοῦ ἐκ χειρὸς ᾅδου; (διάψαλμα).
49	אַיֵּ֤ה ׀ חֲסָדֶ֖יךָ הָרִאשֹׁנִ֥ים ׀ אֲדֹנָ֑י נִשְׁבַּ֥עְתָּ לְ֝דָוִ֗ד בֶּאֱמוּנָתֶֽךָ׃	Lord, where are thy former lovingkindnesses, which thou swarest unto David in thy truth?	ποῦ ἐστι τὰ ἐλέη σου τὰ ἀρχαῖα, Κύριε, ἃ ὤμοσας τῷ Δαυΐδ ἐν τῇ ἀληθείᾳ σου;
50	זְכֹ֣ר אֲ֭דֹנָי חֶרְפַּ֣ת עֲבָדֶ֑יךָ שְׂאֵתִ֥י בְ֝חֵיקִ֗י כׇּל־רַבִּ֥ים עַמִּֽים׃	Remember, Lord, the reproach of thy servants; how I do bear in my bosom the reproach of all the mighty people;	μνήσθητι, Κύριε, τοῦ ὀνειδισμοῦ τῶν δούλων σου, οὗ ὑπέσχον ἐν τῷ κόλπῳ πολλῶν ἐθνῶν,
51	אֲשֶׁ֤ר חֵרְפ֖וּ אוֹיְבֶ֥יךָ ׀ יְהֹוָ֑ה אֲשֶׁ֥ר חֵ֝רְפ֗וּ עִקְּב֥וֹת מְשִׁיחֶֽךָ׃	Wherewith thine enemies have reproached, O LORD; wherewith they have reproached the footsteps of thine anointed.	οὗ ὠνείδισαν οἱ ἐχθροί σου, Κύριε, οὗ ὠνείδισαν τὸ ἀντάλλαγμα τοῦ χριστοῦ σου.
52	בָּר֖וּךְ יְהֹוָ֥ה לְעוֹלָ֗ם אָ֘מֵ֥ן ׀ וְאָמֵֽן׃	Blessed be the LORD for evermore. Amen, and Amen.	εὐλογητὸς Κύριος εἰς τὸν αἰῶνα. γένοιτο γένοιτο.

=== Verse 52 ===
Blessed be the LORD forevermore!
Amen and Amen.

This closing verse is the benediction or doxology by which the third book of the psalter is brought to a close, "[not] part of the original psalm, [but] entirely in harmony with the spirit of it".
