= Norddeutscher Kammerchor =

German chamber Chor

The Norddeutsche Kammerchor is a mixed choir founded by Maria Jürgensen in Hamburg in 2005.

== History and repertoire ==
In January 2005, the ensemble met for the first time under the direction of Maria Jürgensen and performed the cantatas IV to VI from the Christmas Oratorio by Johann Sebastian Bach. As a project-based and institutional unattached choir, the singers have since then performed at various locations, mainly in the North German region. The repertoire spans the arch over the music from the early baroque to contemporary compositions. One main focus is on a cappella music, but also larger works like Bach's St John Passion and his Mass in B minor.

In 2015 the choir was awarded the ECHO Klassik in the category Choral Recording of the Year.

== Recordings ==
- 2011: Johannes Eccard – Mein schönste Zier, MDG 902 1694-6
- 2013: Melchior Franck – Gehet hin in alle Welt, MDG 902 1829-6
- 2017: Johann Sebastian Bach – Partita No. 2 d-Moll, MDG 903 2004-6 (with Gertrud Schilde)
