= Korahites =

Biblical Jewish clan

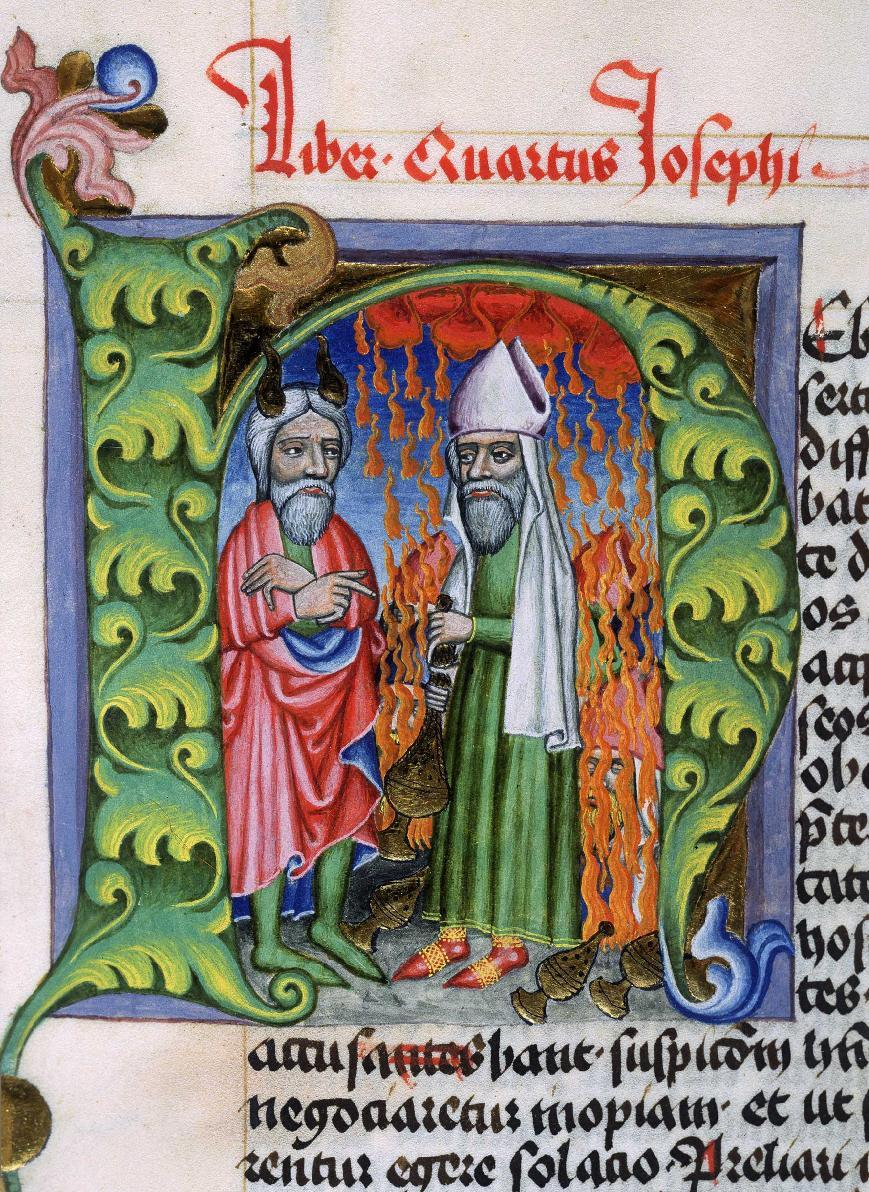
Moses and Korah, 1466

The Korahites (Hebrew: קרחי, Qārəḥî; also בני קרח, bənê Qōraḥ, "sons of Korah") in the Bible were the portion of the Kohathites that descended from the Sons of Korah. They were an important branch of the singers of the Kohathite division (2 Chronicles 20:19).

== Background ==
The Sons of Korah were the sons of Moses' cousin Korah. The story of Korah is found in Numbers 16. Korah led a revolt against Moses; he died, along with all his co-conspirators, when God caused "the earth to open her mouth and swallow him and all that appertained to them" (Numbers 16:31–33). Immediately after this event, the Lord's anger burned and a plague struck killing another 14,700 Israelites. However the Levite's descendants were not removed, where "the sons of Korah died not" (Numbers 26:11). Several psalms are described in their opening verses as being by the Sons of Korah: numbers 42, 44–49, 84, 85, 87 and 88.

Some of the Korahites were also "porters" of the temple (1 Chronicles 9:17–19); one of them was over "things that were made in the pans" (v31), i.e. the baking in pans for the meat-offering (Leviticus 2:5). According to the genealogies in 1 Chronicles, the prophet Samuel was descended from Korah.

== Findings ==
Excavations by Yohanan Aharoni at Tel Arad from 1962 to 1967 uncovered an 8th-century BC ostracon bearing an inscription that listed several family names, among which were "the sons of Korah".

The psalms-based band Sons of Korah take their name from the Sons of Korah in the Bible.
