= Ezekiel 44 =

Book of Ezekiel, chapter 44

- ← chapter 43 chapter 45 →
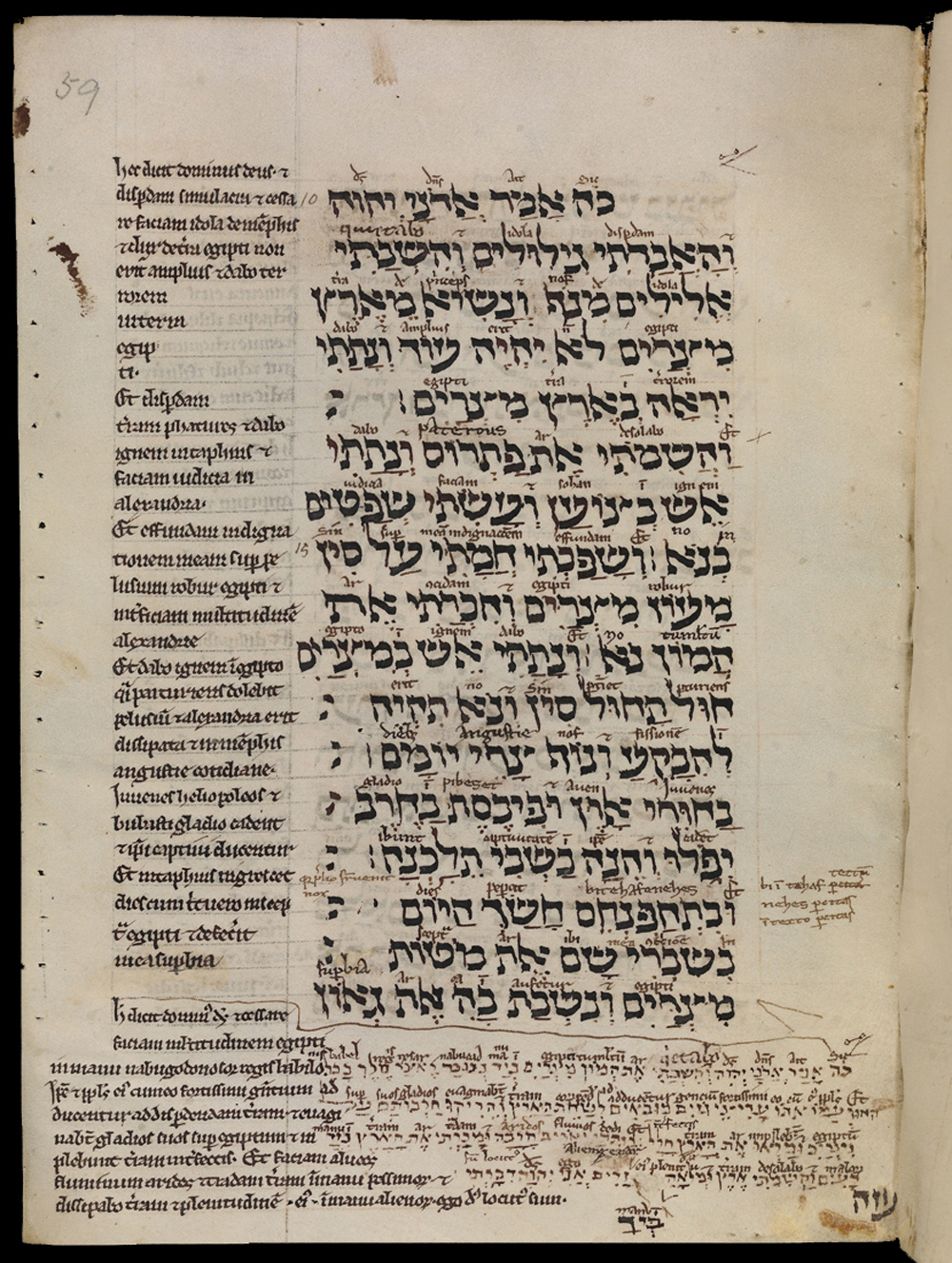
- Book of Ezekiel 30:13–18 in an English manuscript from the early 13th century, MS. Bodl. Or. 62, fol. 59a. A Latin translation appears in the margins with further interlineations above the Hebrew.
- Book: Book of Ezekiel
- Hebrew Bible part: Nevi'im
- Order in the Hebrew part: 7
- Category: Latter Prophets
- Christian Bible part: Old Testament
- Order in the Christian part: 26

Ezekiel 44 is the forty-fourth chapter of the Book of Ezekiel in the Hebrew Bible or the Old Testament of the Christian Bible. This book contains the prophecies attributed to the prophet/priest Ezekiel, and is one of the Books of the Prophets. The final section of Ezekiel, chapters 40-48, give the ideal picture of a new temple. The Jerusalem Bible refers to this section as "the Torah of Ezekiel". In particular, chapters 44–46 record various laws governing the rites and personnel of the sanctuary, as a supplement to Ezekiel's vision.

This chapter contains Ezekiel's vision of the east gate assigned only to the prince (Ezekiel 44:1-3), the people are reproved for steering strangers to pollute the sanctuary (verses 4–8), idolaters are declared incapable of undertaking the priest's office (verses 9–14), the sons of Zadok are accepted thereto (verses 15–16), and ordinances are given for the priests (verses 17–31). The vision was given on the 25th anniversary of Ezekiel's exile, "April 28, 573 BCE", 14 years after the fall of Jerusalem and 12 years after the last messages of hope in chapter 39.

== Text ==
The original text was written in the Hebrew language. This chapter is divided into 31 verses.

=== Textual witnesses ===
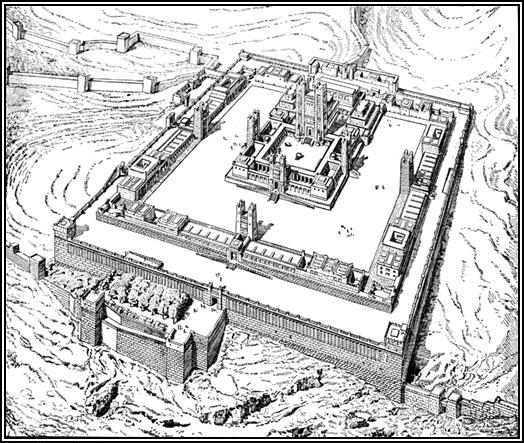
The visionary Ezekiel Temple plan drawn by the 19th-century French architect and Bible scholar Charles Chipiez

Some early manuscripts containing the text of this chapter in Hebrew are of the Masoretic Text tradition, which includes the Codex Cairensis (895), the Petersburg Codex of the Prophets (916), Aleppo Codex (10th century), Codex Leningradensis (1008).

There is also a translation into Koine Greek known as the Septuagint, made in the last few centuries BC. Extant ancient manuscripts of the Septuagint version include Codex Vaticanus (B; $\mathfrak{G}$^{B}; 4th century), Codex Alexandrinus (A; $\mathfrak{G}$^{A}; 5th century) and Codex Marchalianus (Q; $\mathfrak{G}$^{Q}; 6th century). (Note: Ezekiel is missing from the extant Codex Sinaiticus.)

== Laws of the sanctuary (44:1–14) ==
The part begins with the style of the original vision, with Ezekiel being led by the messenger from inner court (Ezekiel 43:5 to the east gate of the outer court (verses 1–3), then to the northern gate facing the inner court (verse 4), followed by the rules and regulations for the temple (verses 5–14).

=== Verse 2 ===
And the Lord said to me, "This gate shall be shut; it shall not be opened, and no man shall enter by it, because the Lord God of Israel has entered by it; therefore it shall be shut."

Biblical commentator Susan Galambush notes that although the commandment suggests the special holiness attributed to the Lord God of Israel's "private entrance", the permanently locked gate also symbolizes the permanence of God's presence in the temple.

=== Verse 3 ===
"As for the prince, because he is the prince, he may sit in it to eat bread before the Lord; he shall enter by way of the vestibule of the gateway, and go out the same way."

The Jerusalem Bible notes that this would have been "a sacred meal, presumably accompanying the communion sacrifice" of Leviticus 7:11-15.

=== Verse 5 ===
And the Lord said to me, "Son of man, mark well, see with your eyes and hear with your ears, all that I say to you concerning all the ordinances of the house of the Lord and all its laws. Mark well who may enter the house and all who go out from the sanctuary."

- "Son of man" (Hebrew: בן־אדם ḇen-'ā-ḏām): this phrase is used 93 times to address Ezekiel, differing the creator God from His creatures, and to put Ezekiel as a "representative member of the human race."

== The Zadokite priesthood (44:15–31) ==
This section records the regulations for the levitical priests of the family of Zadok, who claimed to be of the line of Eleazar, the son of Aaron 1 Chronicles 6:3–8) whereas the other priests claimed to be the descendants of Ithamar, Aaron's youngest son, and the rest of the Levites performed a subordinate role (cf. Numbers 18:1–7). The meanings of these regulations are not completely clear, but mostly in parallel to the Priestly material in the books of Exodus, Leviticus and Numbers.

=== Verse 15 ===
"But the priests, the Levites, the sons of Zadok, who kept charge of My sanctuary when the children of Israel went astray from Me, they shall come near Me to minister to Me; and they shall stand before Me to offer to Me the fat and the blood," says the Lord God.

- Ezekiel belongs to the group of Zadokite priests (1 Chronicles 6:50–53: 1 Chronicles 24:31).

== See also ==
- Israel
- Levi
- New Jerusalem Dead Sea Scroll
- Third Temple
- Zadok
- Related Bible parts: 1 Kings 6, 2 Chronicles 3, Isaiah 2, Ezekiel 1, Ezekiel 40, Ezekiel 41, Ezekiel 42, Revelation 21

== Sources ==
- Bromiley, Geoffrey W. (1995). International Standard Bible Encyclopedia: vol. iv, Q-Z. Eerdmans. ISBN 9780802837844.
- Brown, Francis; Briggs, Charles A.; Driver, S. R. (1994). The Brown-Driver-Briggs Hebrew and English Lexicon (reprint ed.). Hendrickson Publishers. ISBN 978-1565632066.
- Carley, Keith W. (1974). The Book of the Prophet Ezekiel. Cambridge Bible Commentaries on the New English Bible (illustrated ed.). Cambridge University Press. ISBN 9780521097550.
- Clements, Ronald E (1996). Ezekiel. Westminster John Knox Press. ISBN 9780664252724.
- Coogan, Michael David (2007). Coogan, Michael David; Brettler, Marc Zvi; Newsom, Carol Ann; Perkins, Pheme (eds.). The New Oxford Annotated Bible with the Apocryphal/Deuterocanonical Books: New Revised Standard Version, Issue 48 (Augmented 3rd ed.). Oxford University Press. ISBN 9780195288810.
- Galambush, J. (2007). "25. Ezekiel". In Barton, John; Muddiman, John (eds.). The Oxford Bible Commentary (first (paperback) ed.). Oxford University Press. pp. 533–562. ISBN 978-0199277186.
- Gesenius, H. W. F. (1979). Gesenius' Hebrew and Chaldee Lexicon to the Old Testament Scriptures: Numerically Coded to Strong's Exhaustive Concordance, with an English Index. Translated by Tregelles, Samuel Prideaux (7th ed.). Baker Book House.
- Joyce, Paul M. (2009). Ezekiel: A Commentary. Continuum. ISBN 9780567483614.
- The Nelson Study Bible. Thomas Nelson, Inc. 1997. ISBN 9780840715999.
- Würthwein, Ernst (1995). The Text of the Old Testament. Translated by Rhodes, Erroll F. Grand Rapids, MI: Wm. B. Eerdmans. ISBN 0-8028-0788-7.
