= Ezekiel 43 =

Book of Ezekiel, chapter 43

- ← chapter 42 chapter 44 →
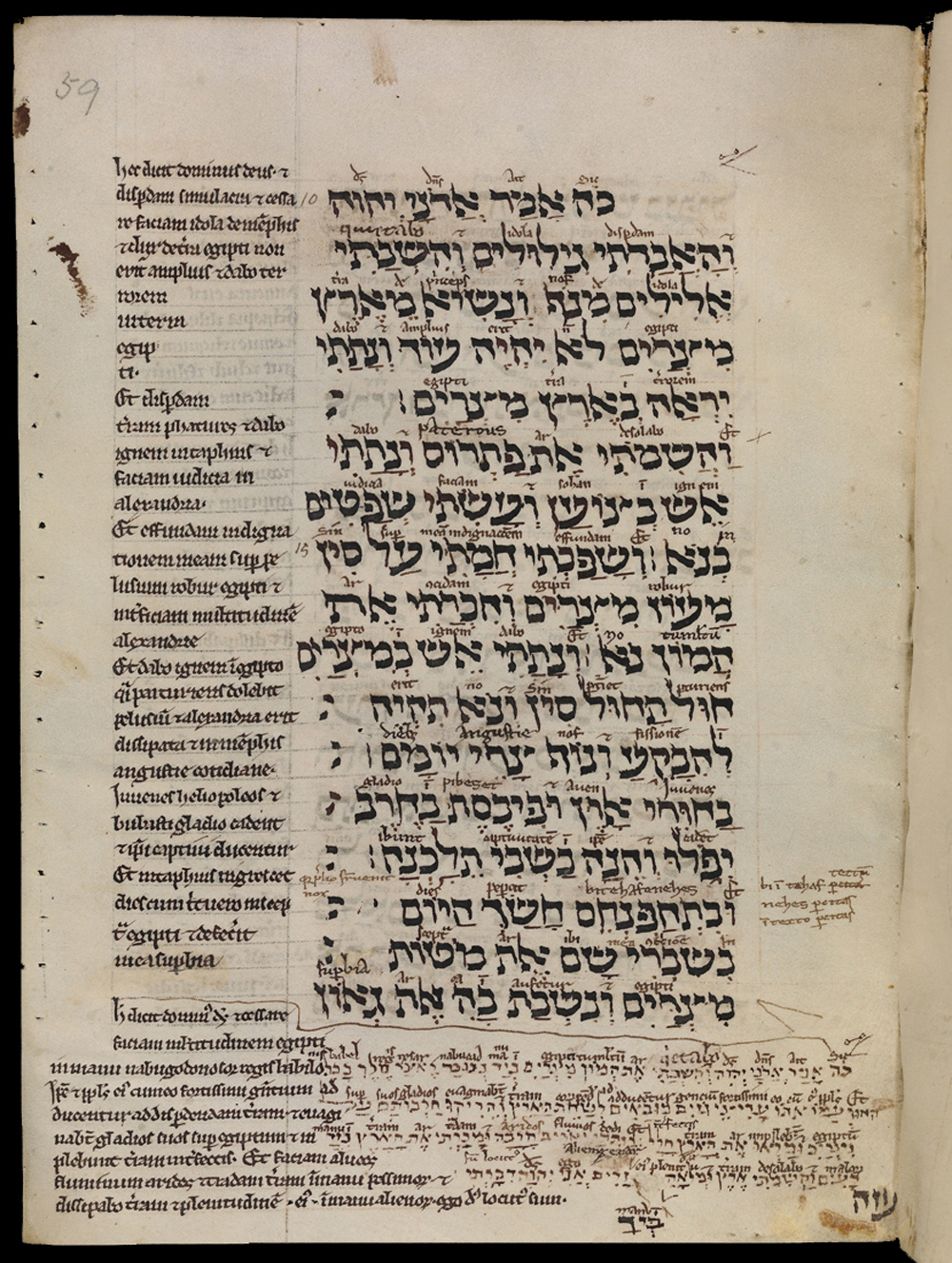
- Book of Ezekiel 30:13–18 in an English manuscript from the early 13th century, MS. Bodl. Or. 62, fol. 59a. A Latin translation appears in the margins with further interlineations above the Hebrew.
- Book: Book of Ezekiel
- Hebrew Bible part: Nevi'im
- Order in the Hebrew part: 7
- Category: Latter Prophets
- Christian Bible part: Old Testament
- Order in the Christian part: 26

Ezekiel 43 is the forty-third chapter of the Book of Ezekiel in the Hebrew Bible or the Old Testament of the Christian Bible. This book contains the prophecies attributed to the prophet/priest Ezekiel, and is one of the Books of the Prophets. Chapters 40-48 give the ideal picture of a new temple. This chapter contains Ezekiel's vision of the glory of God returning into the temple, Ezekiel 43:1-6; God promises to dwell there, if the people will put away their sins, Ezekiel 43:7-9; to incite them to repentance, the prophet shows them the model and law of the house, Ezekiel 43:10-12; the measures of the altar, Ezekiel 43:13-17; the ordinances thereof, Ezekiel 43:18-27.

== Text ==
The original text was written in the Hebrew language. This chapter is divided into 27 verses.

=== Textual witnesses ===
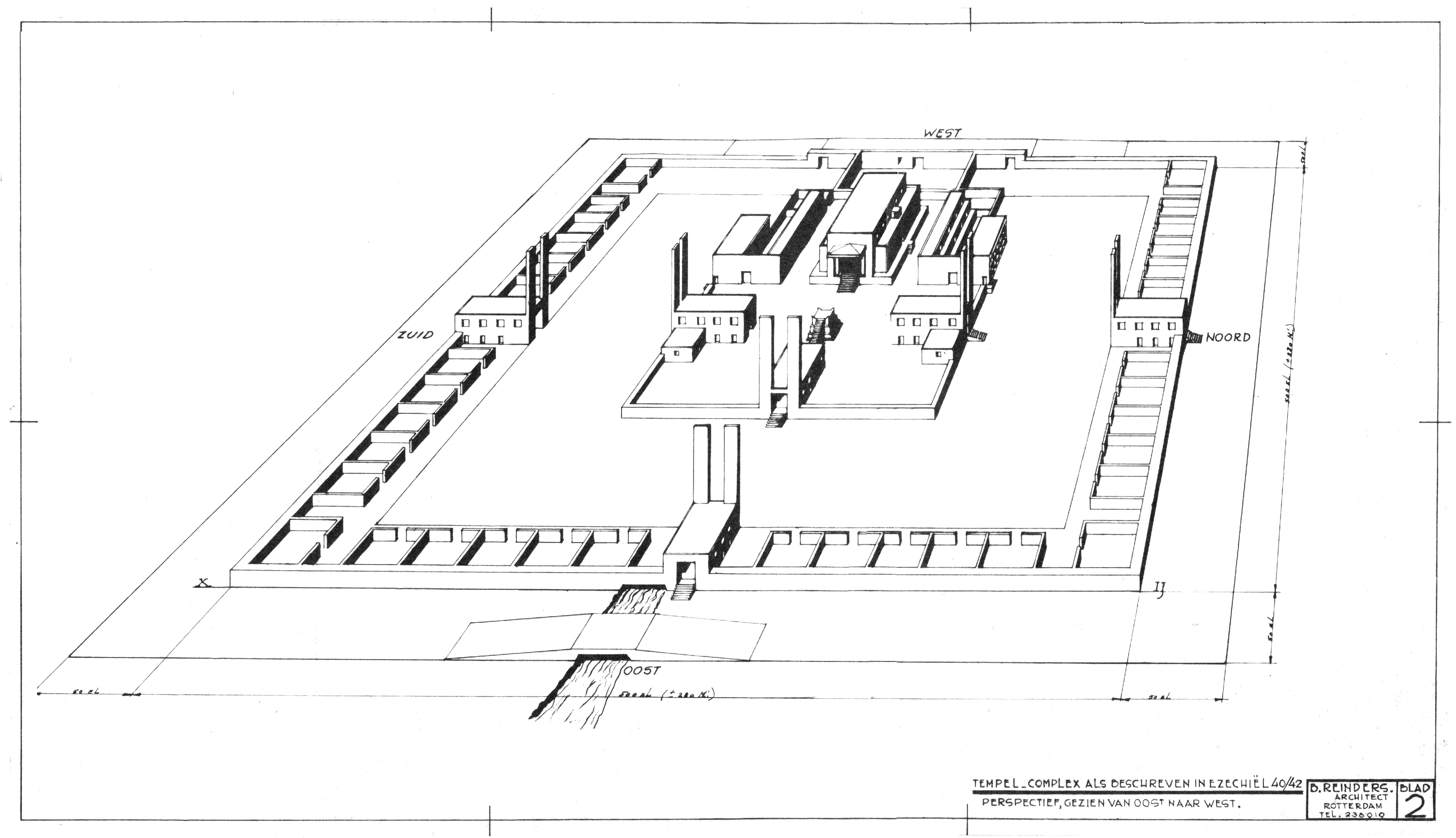
View of Ezekiel's Visionary Temple drawn by Dutch architect Bartelmeüs Reinders Sr. (1893-1979).

Some early manuscripts containing the text of this chapter in Hebrew are of the Masoretic Text tradition, which includes the Codex Cairensis (895), the Petersburg Codex of the Prophets (916), Aleppo Codex (10th century), Codex Leningradensis (1008).

There is also a translation into Koine Greek known as the Septuagint, made in the last few centuries BC. Extant ancient manuscripts of the Septuagint version include Codex Vaticanus (B; $\mathfrak{G}$^{B}; 4th century), Codex Alexandrinus (A; $\mathfrak{G}$^{A}; 5th century) and Codex Marchalianus (Q; $\mathfrak{G}$^{Q}; 6th century). (Note: Ezekiel is missing from the extant Codex Sinaiticus.)

== The glory of God returns (43:1–12) ==
The section records the vision of God's glory returning to the temple, in comparison to its departure in chapters 10 and 11, as Ezekiel witnesses the glory moves through the east gate into the temple, while previously it passed through to move out and stand east of the city (Ezekiel 11:13).

Ezekiel was given the final command to convey the things he saw to the people of Israel (verses 10–12), which summarizes the purpose of his visions and the existence of his book, so that the future generation would know the original authority of the temple rebuilding from his writing (verse 11). The command to "write it down" indicates that most of the messages in this book highly likely were personally written by Ezekiel, giving a rare indication of the literacy and the writing skills among the priests.

=== Verse 1 ===
Afterward he brought me to the gate, the gate that faces toward the east.

This was the gate first surveyed, in Ezekiel 40:6.

=== Verse 3 ===
And it was according to the appearance of the vision which I saw,
even according to the vision that I saw when I came to destroy the city:
and the visions were like the vision that I saw by the river Chebar;
and I fell upon my face.

The "River Chebar" is generally identified as the "Kebar Canal", near Nippur in what is now Iraq. It was part of a complex network of irrigation and transport canals which also included the Shatt el-Nil, a silted up canal toward the east of Babylon. The earlier vision referred to was recounted in Ezekiel 1:1.

=== Verse 7 ===
And He said to me, "Son of man, this is the place of My throne and the place of the soles of My feet, where I will dwell in the midst of the children of Israel forever. No more shall the house of Israel defile My holy name, they nor their kings, by their harlotry or with the carcasses of their kings on their high places.

- The vision was given on the 25th anniversary of Ezekiel's exile, "April 28, 573 BCE"; 14 years after the fall of Jerusalem and 12 years after the last messages of hope in chapter 39.
- "Son of man" (Hebrew: בן־אדם ḇen-'ā-ḏām): this phrase is used 93 times to address Ezekiel, distinguishing the creator God from God's creatures, and to put Ezekiel as a "representative member of the human race."

== The altar of burnt offering (43:13–17) ==
This part is an addition to the short description of the altar in the inner court in Ezekiel 40:47. The design gives an appearance like a Babylonian temple-tower, unlike the altar of unhewn stones actually used in the post-exilic temple.

=== Verse 13 ===
These are the measurements of the altar in cubits (the cubit is one cubit and a handbreadth): the base one cubit high and one cubit wide, with a rim all around its edge of one span. This is the height of the altar:

- "Cubit": here is a "long cubit", about 21 inches (53 cm), a sum of "short cubit" and "a handbreadth" as defined in Ezekiel 40:5.

== The consecration of the altar (43:18–27) ==
This section is apparently a later addition, referring to the Priestly material in Exodus 29:36f. After the altar was consecrated by special offerings of seven days, it can be used for regular sacrifices. The regulations were likely incorporated to fill in details for the original report as well as to avoid disorder, and – along the visions in the book – were preserved in the post-exilic period by the descendants of the influential priest group that was exiled together with Ezekiel.

== See also ==
- Chebar
- Levi
- New Jerusalem Dead Sea Scroll
- Third Temple
- Zadok
- Related Bible parts: 1 Kings 6, 2 Chronicles 3, Isaiah 2, Ezekiel 1, Ezekiel 40, Ezekiel 41, Ezekiel 42, Revelation 21

== Sources ==
- Bromiley, Geoffrey W. (1995). International Standard Bible Encyclopedia: vol. iv, Q-Z. Eerdmans. ISBN 9780802837844.
- Brown, Francis; Briggs, Charles A.; Driver, S. R. (1994). The Brown-Driver-Briggs Hebrew and English Lexicon (reprint ed.). Hendrickson Publishers. ISBN 978-1565632066.
- Carley, Keith W. (1974). The Book of the Prophet Ezekiel. Cambridge Bible Commentaries on the New English Bible (illustrated ed.). Cambridge University Press. ISBN 9780521097550.
- Clements, Ronald E (1996). Ezekiel. Westminster John Knox Press. ISBN 9780664252724.
- Coogan, Michael David (2007). Coogan, Michael David; Brettler, Marc Zvi; Newsom, Carol Ann; Perkins, Pheme (eds.). The New Oxford Annotated Bible with the Apocryphal/Deuterocanonical Books: New Revised Standard Version, Issue 48 (Augmented 3rd ed.). Oxford University Press. ISBN 9780195288810.
- Gesenius, H. W. F. (1979). Gesenius' Hebrew and Chaldee Lexicon to the Old Testament Scriptures: Numerically Coded to Strong's Exhaustive Concordance, with an English Index. Translated by Tregelles, Samuel Prideaux (7th ed.). Baker Book House.
- Joyce, Paul M. (2009). Ezekiel: A Commentary. Continuum. ISBN 9780567483614.
- The Nelson Study Bible. Thomas Nelson, Inc. 1997. ISBN 9780840715999.
- Würthwein, Ernst (1995). The Text of the Old Testament. Translated by Rhodes, Erroll F. Grand Rapids, MI: Wm. B. Eerdmans. ISBN 0-8028-0788-7.
