= Ezekiel 42 =

Book of Ezekiel, chapter 42

- ← chapter 41 chapter 43 →
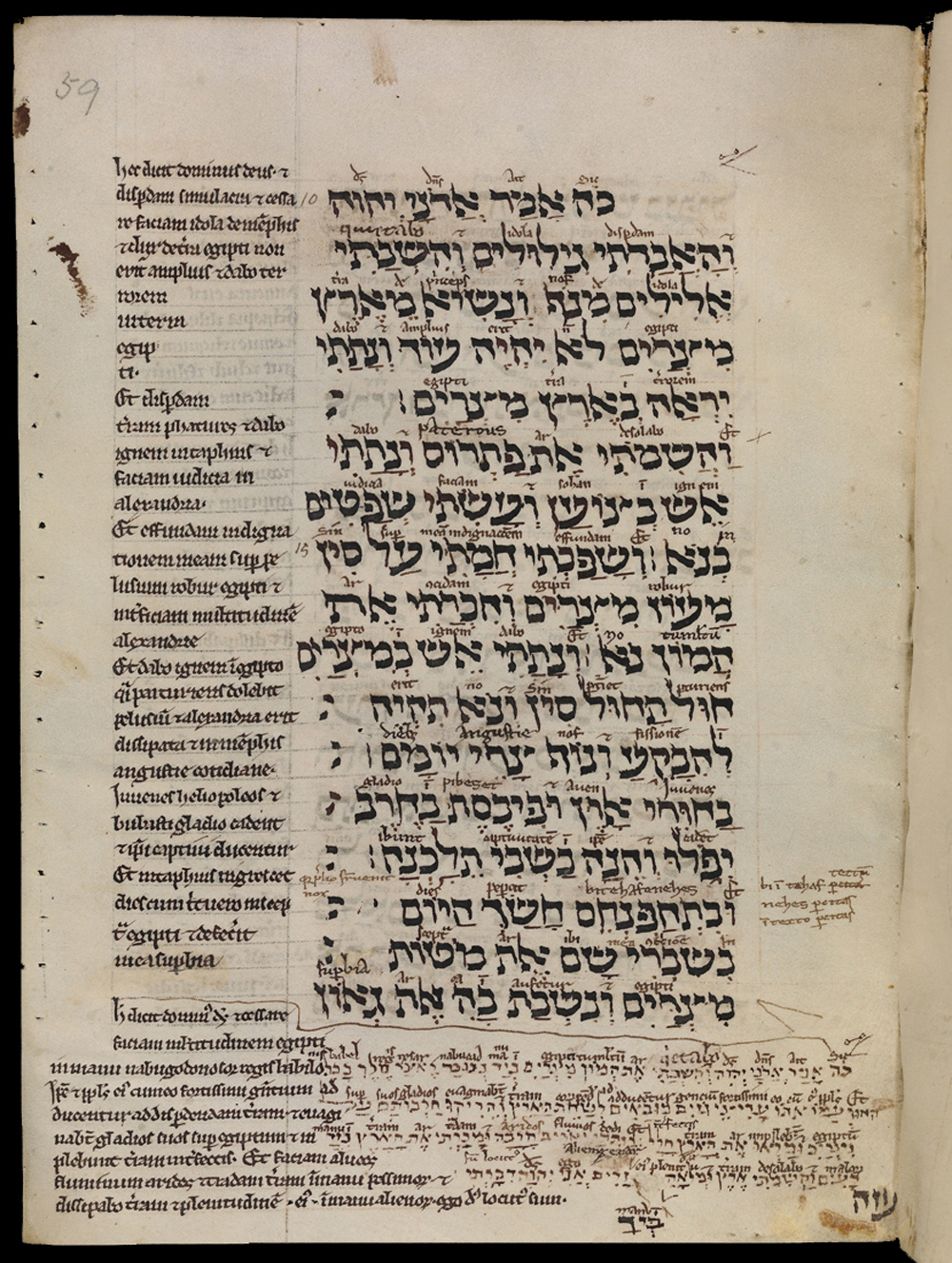
- Book of Ezekiel 30:13–18 in an English manuscript from the early 13th century, MS. Bodl. Or. 62, fol. 59a. A Latin translation appears in the margins with further interlineations above the Hebrew.
- Book: Book of Ezekiel
- Hebrew Bible part: Nevi'im
- Order in the Hebrew part: 7
- Category: Latter Prophets
- Christian Bible part: Old Testament
- Order in the Christian part: 26

Ezekiel 42 is the forty-second chapter of the Book of Ezekiel in the Hebrew Bible or the Old Testament of the Christian Bible. This book contains the prophecies attributed to the prophet/priest Ezekiel, and is one of the Books of the Prophets. The Jerusalem Bible refers to the final section of Ezekiel, chapters 40-48, as "the Torah of Ezekiel": "a blueprint for the religious and political rehabilitation of the Israelite nation in Palestine". These chapters provide the ideal picture of a new temple: chapter 42 contains Ezekiel's vision of the outbuildings or chambers for the priests (Ezekiel 42:1-12), the use of the chambers (verses 13–14), and the dimensions of the outer court (verses 15–20).

== Text ==
The original text was written in the Hebrew language. This chapter is divided into 20 verses.

=== Textual witnesses ===
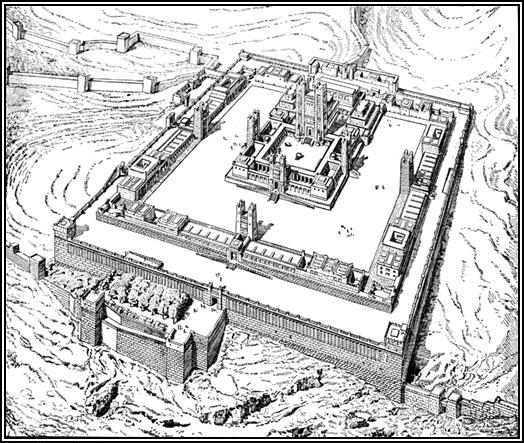
The visionary Ezekiel Temple plan drawn by the 19th-century French architect and Bible scholar Charles Chipiez

Some early manuscripts containing the text of this chapter in Hebrew are of the Masoretic Text tradition, which includes the Codex Cairensis (895), the Petersburg Codex of the Prophets (916), Aleppo Codex (10th century), Codex Leningradensis (1008).

There is also a translation into Koine Greek known as the Septuagint, made in the last few centuries BC. Extant ancient manuscripts of the Septuagint version include Codex Vaticanus (B; $\mathfrak{G}$^{B}; 4th century), Codex Alexandrinus (A; $\mathfrak{G}$^{A}; 5th century) and Codex Marchalianus (Q; $\mathfrak{G}$^{Q}; 6th century). (Note: Ezekiel is missing from the extant Codex Sinaiticus.)

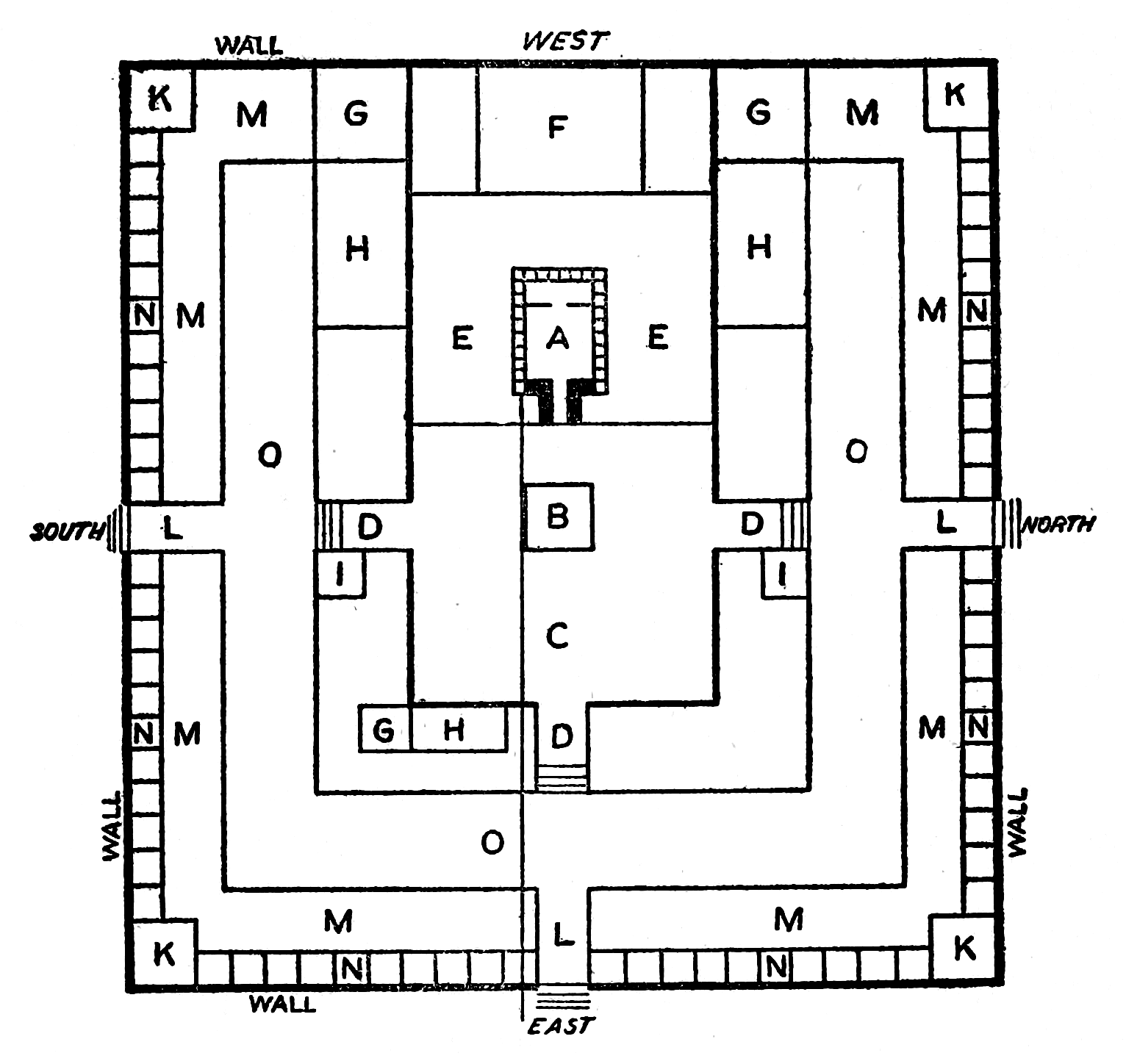
Ground Plan of Ezekiel's Temple: A. The Temple House B. Altar of Burnt Offering C. Inner Court D. Gates to Inner Court E. Separate Place F. Hinder Building G. Priest's Kitchens H. Chambers for Priests I. Chambers K. People's Kitchen L. Gates into Outer Court M. Pavement N. Chambers in Outer Court (30) O. Outer Court A line indicates the Temple Stream.

== The priests' rooms (verses 1–14) ==
This part record the details of the rooms of chambers facing the free space reserved for the priests (denoted by letter H in the temple plan on the right) and the building on the west side of the temple (mentioned in Ezekiel 41:12–15); the text is difficult to interpret. The exposition starts from the north rooms, apparently in 3 parallel blocks, each set in incremental height on the slope between the outer court and temple yard, with the rooms nearest to the temple twice in size of those closer to the outer court (verse 8), with the priests' kitchen at the western end (Ezekiel 46:19f; denoted by letter G in the temple plan).

=== Verse 1 ===
Then he brought me out into the outer court, by the way toward the north; and he brought me into the chamber which was opposite the separating courtyard, and which was opposite the building toward the north.

- The vision was given on the 25th anniversary of Ezekiel's exile, "April 28, 573 BCE"; 14 years after the fall of Jerusalem and 12 years after the last messages of hope in chapter 39. Plans for "the chambers all around" had also been included in the designs for the first temple which King David had provided for his son Solomon.

=== Verse 2 ===
Facing the length, which was one hundred cubits (the width was fifty cubits), was the north door.

- "Cubit" here is a "long cubit" or "royal cubit", about 21 inches (53 cm), as defined in Ezekiel 40:5.

=== Verse 13 ===
Then he said to me, "The north chambers and the south chambers, which are opposite the separating courtyard, are the holy chambers where the priests who approach the Lord shall eat the most holy offerings. There they shall lay the most holy offerings—the grain offering, the sin offering, and the trespass offering—for the place is holy."

Cross reference: Ezekiel 40:38–39; Ezekiel 44:28–31; Ezekiel 45:10–17; Leviticus 2:1–10; Leviticus 7:7–10

- The vestibules of the inner gates are sanctified for the preparation of the offerings: "burnt, sin and guilt offerings" (Leviticus 1:1–7:38).

The rooms have three main purposes: where the priests eat, where the priests store offerings in excess of the immediate requirements, and where the priests robe themselves for service of the altar.

== The overall dimensions (verses 15–20) ==
This section resumes the original vision from Ezekiel 40:4, as Ezekiel follows the angel measuring the outer wall of the temple area, which, according to verse 20, is the boundary of the sacred area.

== See also ==
- New Jerusalem Dead Sea Scroll
- Solomon's Temple
- Third Temple
- Related Bible parts: Leviticus 1, Leviticus 2, Leviticus 3, Leviticus 4, Leviticus 5, Leviticus 6, Leviticus 7, 1 Kings 6, 2 Chronicles 3, Isaiah 2, Ezekiel 40, Ezekiel 44, Revelation 21

== Sources ==
- Bromiley, Geoffrey W. (1995). International Standard Bible Encyclopedia: vol. iv, Q-Z. Eerdmans. ISBN 9780802837844.
- Brown, Francis; Briggs, Charles A.; Driver, S. R. (1994). The Brown-Driver-Briggs Hebrew and English Lexicon (reprint ed.). Hendrickson Publishers. ISBN 978-1565632066.
- Carley, Keith W. (1974). The Book of the Prophet Ezekiel. Cambridge Bible Commentaries on the New English Bible (illustrated ed.). Cambridge University Press. ISBN 9780521097550.
- Clements, Ronald E (1996). Ezekiel. Westminster John Knox Press. ISBN 9780664252724.
- Coogan, Michael David (2007). Coogan, Michael David; Brettler, Marc Zvi; Newsom, Carol Ann; Perkins, Pheme (eds.). The New Oxford Annotated Bible with the Apocryphal/Deuterocanonical Books: New Revised Standard Version, Issue 48 (Augmented 3rd ed.). Oxford University Press. ISBN 9780195288810.
- Gesenius, H. W. F. (1979). Gesenius' Hebrew and Chaldee Lexicon to the Old Testament Scriptures: Numerically Coded to Strong's Exhaustive Concordance, with an English Index. Translated by Tregelles, Samuel Prideaux (7th ed.). Baker Book House.
- Joyce, Paul M. (2009). Ezekiel: A Commentary. Continuum. ISBN 9780567483614.
- The Nelson Study Bible. Thomas Nelson, Inc. 1997. ISBN 9780840715999.
- Würthwein, Ernst (1995). The Text of the Old Testament. Translated by Rhodes, Erroll F. Grand Rapids, MI: Wm. B. Eerdmans. ISBN 0-8028-0788-7.
