= Ezekiel 41 =

Book of Ezekiel, chapter 41

- ← chapter 40 chapter 42 →
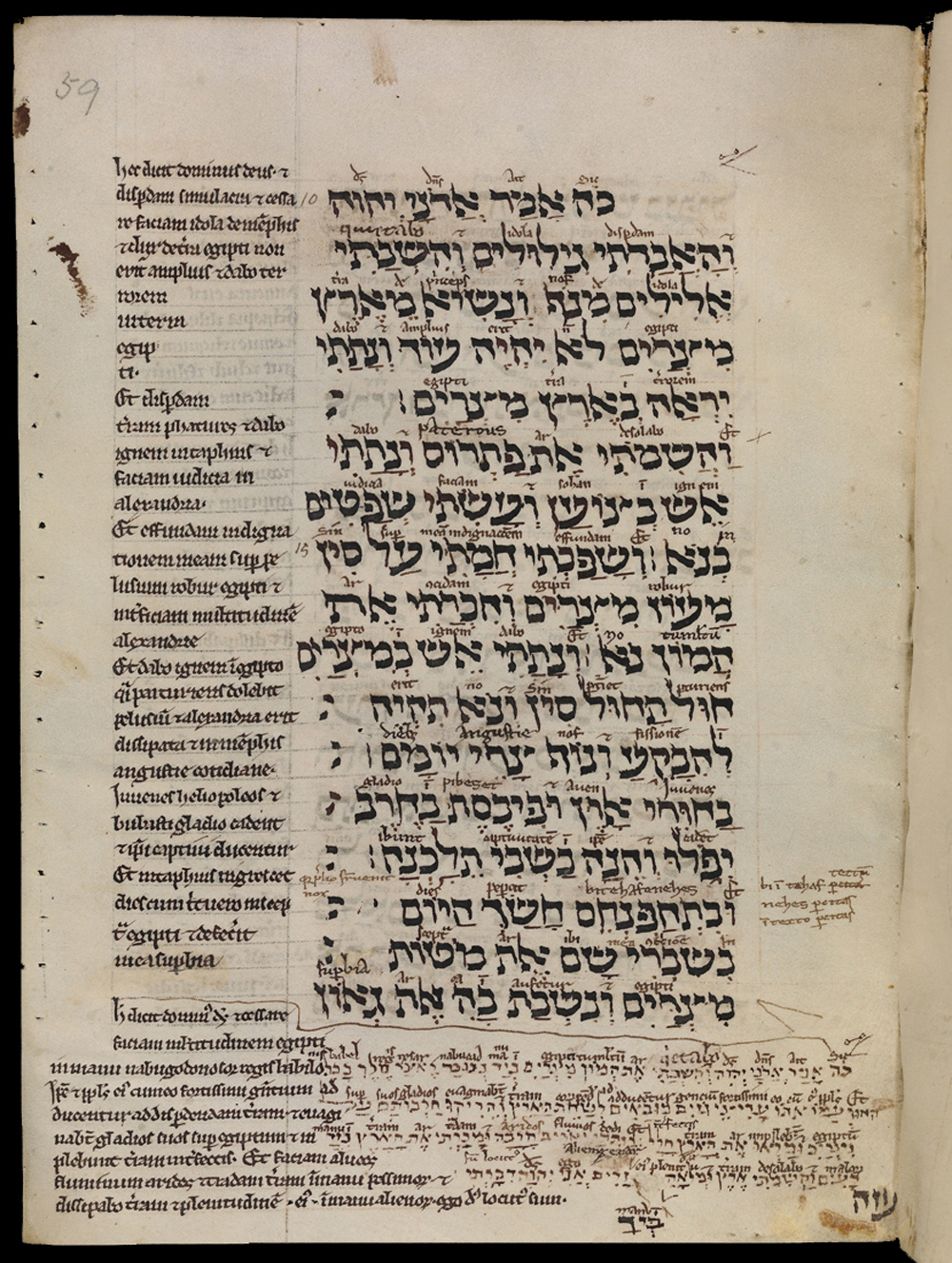
- Book of Ezekiel 30:13–18 in an English manuscript from the early 13th century, MS. Bodl. Or. 62, fol. 59a. A Latin translation appears in the margins with further interlineations above the Hebrew.
- Book: Book of Ezekiel
- Hebrew Bible part: Nevi'im
- Order in the Hebrew part: 7
- Category: Latter Prophets
- Christian Bible part: Old Testament
- Order in the Christian part: 26

Ezekiel 41 is the forty-first chapter of the Book of Ezekiel in the Hebrew Bible or the Old Testament of the Christian Bible. This book contains the prophecies attributed to the prophet/priest Ezekiel, and is one of the Books of the Prophets. The Jerusalem Bible refers to the final section of Ezekiel, chapters 40-48, as "the Torah of Ezekiel": "a blueprint for the religious and political rehabilitation of the Israelite nation in Palestine". This chapter continues Ezekiel's vision of a future Temple.

== Text ==
The original text was written in the Hebrew language. This chapter is divided into 26 verses.

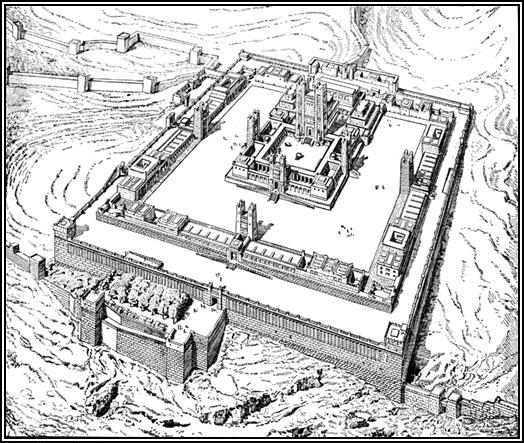
The visionary Ezekiel Temple plan drawn by the 19th-century French architect and Bible scholar Charles Chipiez

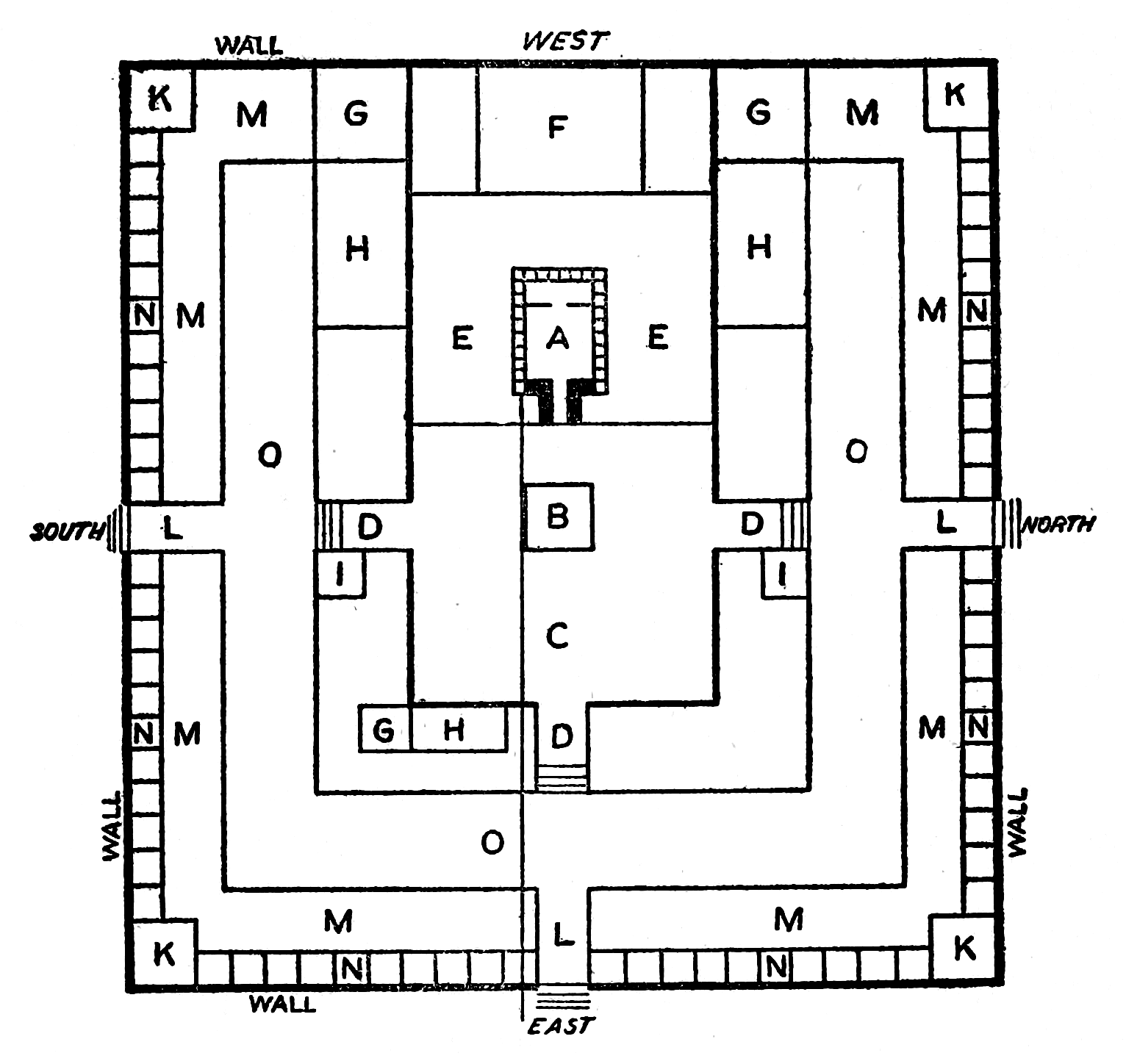
Ground Plan of Ezekiel's Temple: A. The Temple House B. Altar of Burnt Offering C. Inner Court D. Gates to Inner Court E. Separate Place F. Hinder Building G. Priest's Kitchens H. Chambers for Priests I. Chambers K. People's Kitchen L. Gates into Outer Court M. Pavement N. Chambers in Outer Court (30) O. Outer Court A line indicates the Temple Stream.

=== Textual witnesses ===
Some early manuscripts containing the text of this chapter in Hebrew are of the Masoretic Text tradition, which includes the Codex Cairensis (895), the Petersburg Codex of the Prophets (916), Aleppo Codex (10th century), Codex Leningradensis (1008). Fragments containing parts of this chapter were found among the Dead Sea Scrolls, that is, 4Q73 (4QEzek^{a}; 50–25 BCE) with extant verses 3–6.

There is also a translation into Koine Greek known as the Septuagint, made in the last few centuries BCE. Extant ancient manuscripts of the Septuagint version include Codex Vaticanus (B; $\mathfrak{G}$^{B}; 4th century), Codex Alexandrinus (A; $\mathfrak{G}$^{A}; 5th century) and Codex Marchalianus (Q; $\mathfrak{G}$^{Q}; 6th century). (Note: Ezekiel is missing from the extant Codex Sinaiticus.)

Third temple floor sketch based on Rabbi Meir Leibush ben Yehiel Michal's commentary on the Hebrew text of Ezekiel

== The sanctuary (verses 1–4) ==
Ezekiel is brought into the "sanctuary", or nave/main room in the temple, which length and width are the same as in Solomon's temple (1 Kings 6:2, 17), but no mention of the height. There is apparently no altar of incense, lamps, or other parts that were in the former temple (1 Kings 7:48)f.

=== Verse 1 ===
Then he brought me into the sanctuary and measured the doorposts,

six cubits wide on one side and six cubits wide on the other side—the width of the tabernacle.

- The vision was given on the 25th anniversary of Ezekiel's exile, "April 28, 573 BCE".
- "Sanctuary" (Hebrew היכל): here "the main room of the temple", sometimes called the "holy place" (compare Exodus 26:33)
- Septuagint doesn't have "–the width of the tabernacle" (lit. "the tent"); it is found in Hebrew texts.

=== Verse 4 ===
He measured the length, twenty cubits; and the width, twenty cubits, beyond the sanctuary;
and he said to me, “This is the Most Holy Place.”

- Ezekiel did not enter the Most Holy Place, because he is just a priest, not the high priest, and only the high priest can enter that room, once a year, on the day of atonement (Leviticus 16).

== The side buildings (verses 5–15a) ==
This part starts a series of passages providing more information for the previous short description; the original account will continue in Ezekiel 42:15f. The details of the arcades or side-chambers (Verses 5–7) are unclear, but seem to match the pattern of Solomon's temple (1 Kings 6:5–10).

=== Verse 9 ===
The thickness of the outer wall of the side chambers was five cubits, and so also the remaining terrace by the place of the side chambers of the temple.

"The remaining terrace" is translated "that which was left" in the King James Version, "the free space" in the New Revised Standard Version. Jamieson, Fausset and Brown note that there was unoccupied space in Solomon's Temple which the Kings of Judah had used for horses dedicated to the sun, and that in Ezekiel's visionary temple there was to be no space which was not sacred to the Lord.

== The design inside (verses 15b–26) ==
This section describes the interior design inside the temple; the details are obscure. In this addition, the interior of the Most Holy Place or the Holy of Holies is described openly unlike in the previous part.

== See also ==
- New Jerusalem Dead Sea Scroll
- Solomon's Temple
- Third Temple
- Related Bible parts: 1 Kings 6, 2 Chronicles 3, Isaiah 2, Ezekiel 40, Revelation 21

== Sources ==
- Bromiley, Geoffrey W. (1995). International Standard Bible Encyclopedia: vol. iv, Q-Z. Eerdmans. ISBN 9780802837844.
- Brown, Francis; Briggs, Charles A.; Driver, S. R. (1994). The Brown-Driver-Briggs Hebrew and English Lexicon (reprint ed.). Hendrickson Publishers. ISBN 978-1565632066.
- Carley, Keith W. (1974). The Book of the Prophet Ezekiel. Cambridge Bible Commentaries on the New English Bible (illustrated ed.). Cambridge University Press. ISBN 9780521097550.
- Clements, Ronald E (1996). Ezekiel. Westminster John Knox Press. ISBN 9780664252724.
- Coogan, Michael David (2007). Coogan, Michael David; Brettler, Marc Zvi; Newsom, Carol Ann; Perkins, Pheme (eds.). The New Oxford Annotated Bible with the Apocryphal/Deuterocanonical Books: New Revised Standard Version, Issue 48 (Augmented 3rd ed.). Oxford University Press. ISBN 9780195288810.
- Gesenius, H. W. F. (1979). Gesenius' Hebrew and Chaldee Lexicon to the Old Testament Scriptures: Numerically Coded to Strong's Exhaustive Concordance, with an English Index. Translated by Tregelles, Samuel Prideaux (7th ed.). Baker Book House.
- Joyce, Paul M. (2009). Ezekiel: A Commentary. Continuum. ISBN 9780567483614.
- Würthwein, Ernst (1995). The Text of the Old Testament. Translated by Rhodes, Erroll F. Grand Rapids, MI: Wm. B. Eerdmans. ISBN 0-8028-0788-7.
