= New Earth (Christianity) =

Doctrine of Christian eschatology

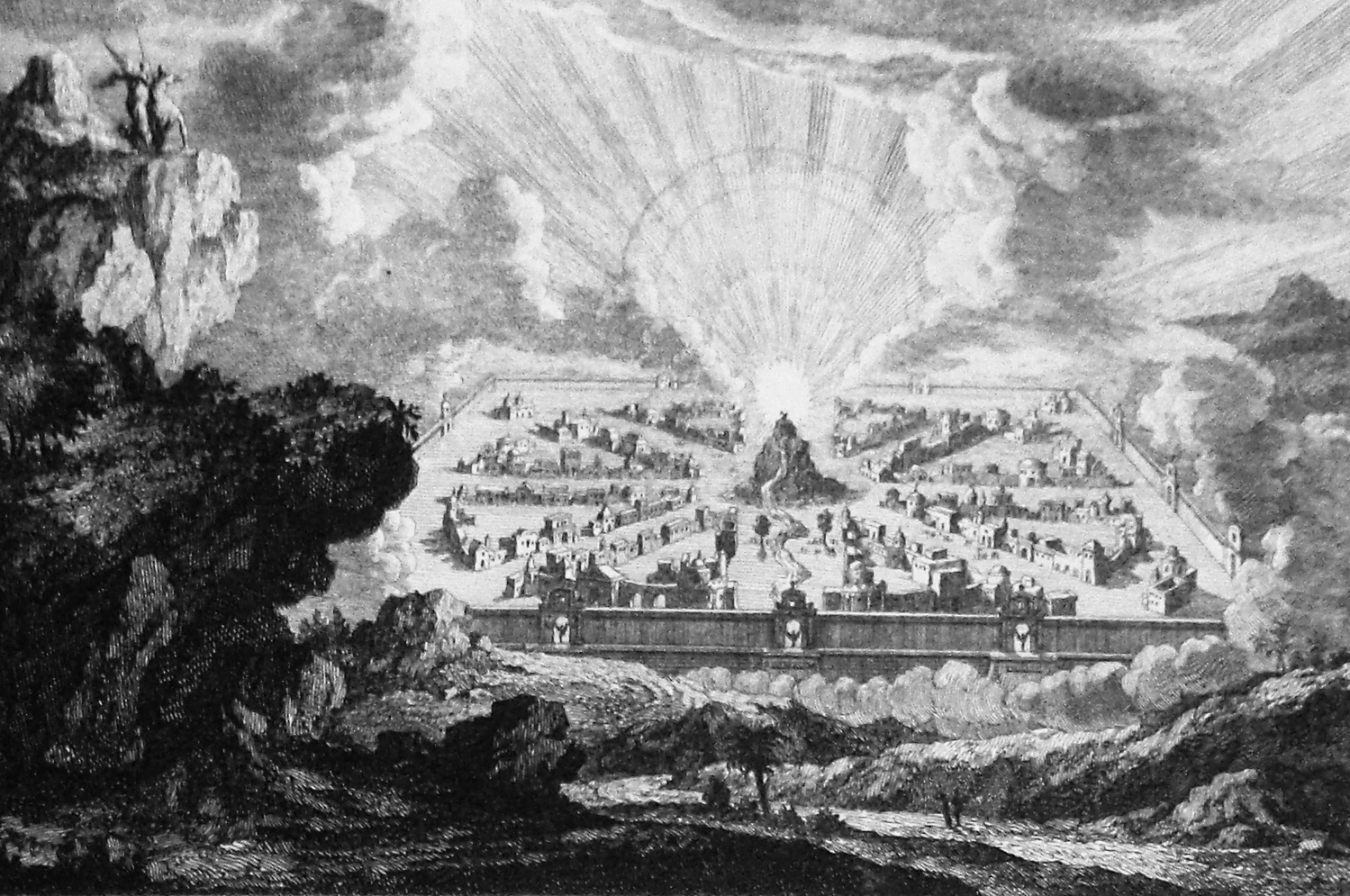
Revelation 21:1: A new heaven and new earth, Mortier's Bible, Phillip Medhurst Collection

The New Earth is an expression used in the Book of Isaiah (65:17 & 66:22), 2 Peter (3:13), and the Book of Revelation (21:1) in the Bible to describe the final state of redeemed humanity. It is one of the central doctrines of Christian eschatology and is referred to in the Nicene Creed as the world to come.

== Biblical references ==
The twenty-first chapter of the Book of Revelation introduces the final state of perfection where, according to one commentator, "cosmic time has been turned into eternity." In symbolic and visual language, God allows John to see the glory and beauty of the inheritance of His people. The first thing the reader notices about this vision is that it includes a "new heavens and a new earth" (21:1). To understand what the Bible teaches about eternity, the reader of the Apocalypse must understand the New Testament doctrine of the "New Heavens and the New Earth."

The basic difference with the promises of the Old Testament is that in Revelation they also have an ontological value (Rev. 21:1;4: "Then I saw 'a new heaven and a new earth,' for the first heaven and the first earth had passed away, and there was no longer any sea...'He will wipe every tear from their eyes. There will be no more death' or mourning or crying or pain, for the old order of things has passed away") and no longer just gnosiological (Isaiah 65:17: "See, I will create/new heavens and a new earth./The former things will not be remembered,/nor will they come to mind").

But, in accordance with his promise, we wait for new heavens and a new earth, where righteousness is at home (2 Peter 3:13).

== Interpretation ==
In Koine Greek, there were two words that are translated as "new" in the English Bible; neos and kainos. One Greek resource states:

As distinct from néos, "new in time," kainós means "new in nature" (with an implication of "better"). Both words suggest "unfamiliar," "unexpected," "wonderful," and the distinction fades with time.

That kainos should not be taken as something totally new can be seen in a passage like the following:

Therefore if any man be in Christ, he is a new creature: old things are passed away; behold, all things are become new (2 Corinthians 5:17 KJV)

Here the Apostle Paul uses kainos in the expression "new creation." Paul did not intend to convey the idea that this is a completely different individual. There is continuity between the old person and the new person to such an extent that it remains the same person, but renovated. The person is the same, but the quality of that person has been transformed.

In the same way, the biblical concept of the New Earth is one of renovation and restoration. Either on this current earth or on a rebuilt new planet. This conclusion is supported by Peter's words in his public speech in the temple at Jerusalem.

19 Repent ye therefore, and be converted, that your sins may be blotted out, when the times of refreshing shall come from the presence of the Lord.

20 And he shall send Jesus Christ, which before was preached unto you:

21 Whom the heaven must receive until the times of restitution of all things, which God hath spoken by the mouth of all his holy prophets since the world began.

This earth, however, will be either cleansed or destroyed by a very high heat or a great fire, for the purpose of restoration as expressed in the following passage:

10 But the day of the Lord will come as a thief in the night; in the which the heavens shall pass away with a great noise, and the elements shall melt with fervent heat, the earth also and the works that are therein shall be burned up.

11 Seeing then that all these things shall be dissolved, what manner of persons ought ye to be in all holy conversation and godliness,

12 Looking for and hasting unto the coming of the day of God, wherein the heavens being on fire shall be dissolved, and the elements shall melt with fervent heat? (2 Peter 3:10-12 KJV)

=== Catholicism ===
==== Official teaching ====
The Roman Catholic Church links the New Earth with the New Creation, seeing them both signified in baptism. Baptismal grace — in particular, the fruit of the Holy Spirit — is a foretaste of eternal life in Paradise, which in turn is a foretaste of deified life in the New Earth on Judgment Day.

On Judgment Day, Heaven will unite with the Universe via the Second Coming, whereby the whole Universe and all angels and saints will be deified, just as Jesus' humanity was deified via his resurrection. The Universe is unconditionally predestined for deification, while angels' and persons' respective predestinations are both conditioned on moral behavior.

Despite being resurrected unto immortality along with the saints, the damned — along with Satan and the rest of the demons — will forever be prisoners in hell. By rejecting God, they reject eternal deified life with God in the New Earth.

The deified Universe, and all creatures therein, is collectively called the "New Jerusalem" or "Heavenly Jerusalem" because it is the definitive house and reign of God.

==== Unofficial teaching ====
Saint Thomas Aquinas argues that the new heavens and the new earth will include material components as well as a spiritual ones. But in Summa Contra Gentiles, he teaches that the New Earth will lack everything unnecessary: eating and defecation, food and cooking, animals and plants, etc.

== See also ==
- New Jerusalem
