= Georges Perrot =

French archaeologist and classical scholar (1832–1914)

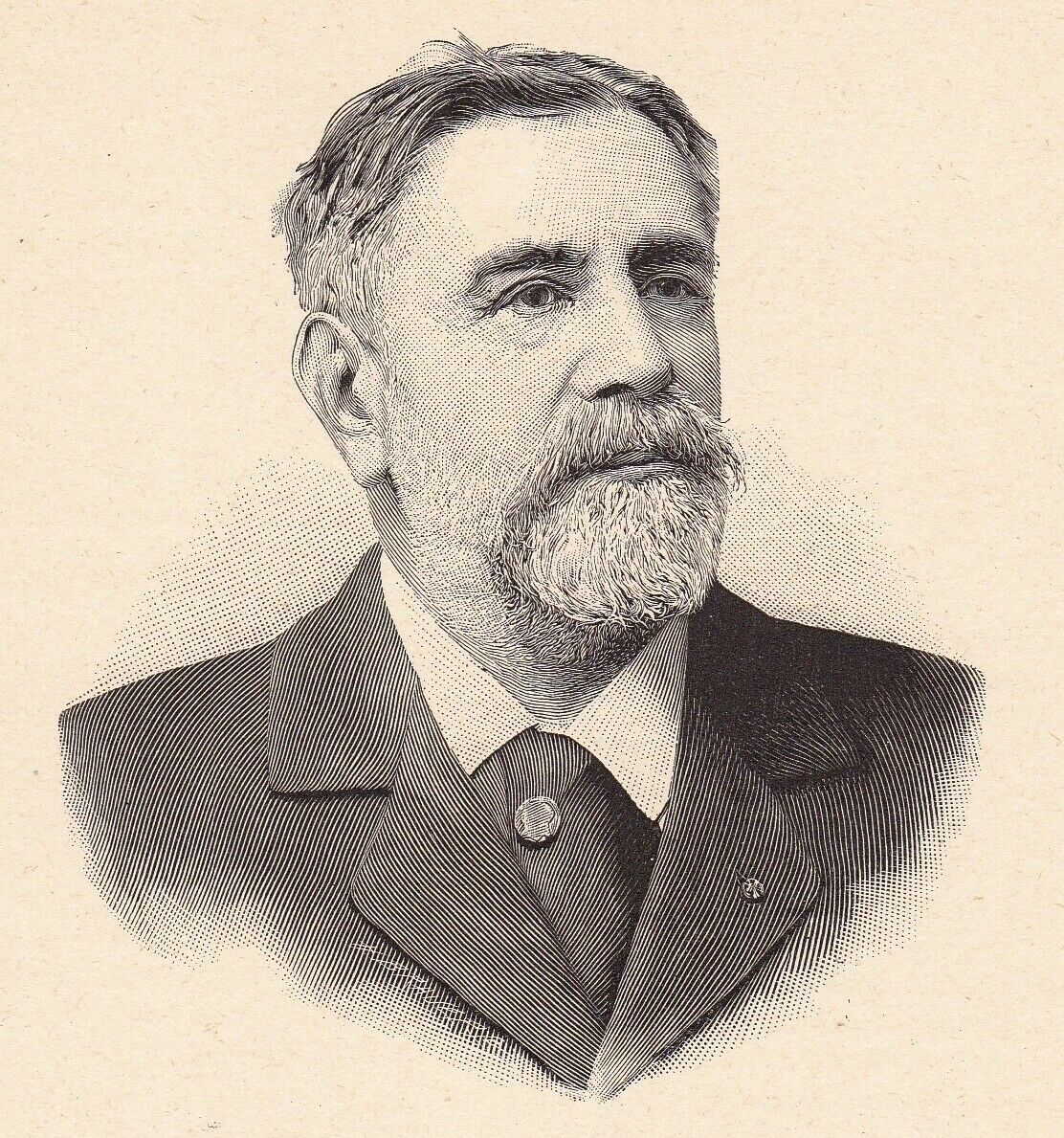
- Born: 12 November 1832
- Died: 30 June 1914 (aged 81)

Academic work
- Discipline: archaeology
- Institutions: Sorbonne; École Normale Supérieure
- Notable works: Histoire de l'art dans l'antiquité

Georges Perrot (English: /pɛˈroʊ/ peh-ROH, French: [ʒɔʁʒ pɛʁo]; 12 November 1832 – 30 June 1914) was a French archaeologist.

He taught at the Sorbonne from 1875 and was director of the École Normale Supérieure from 1888 to 1902. In 1874 he was elected to the Academie des Inscriptions et Belles-Lettres, where he served as the permanent secretary from 1904 until his death.

After discovering a first fragment of the Gortyn code in 1857, his most famous archaeological discovery was made while on an expedition to Asia Minor in 1861, where he found a Greek translation of the document known as 'The Political Testament of the Emperor Augustus'. Perrot edited and contributed to the journal Revue archéologique. His works include the two accounts of his expedition to Asia Minor (published 1862 and 1864), and the ten-volume Histoire de l'art dans l'antiquité, which he wrote with Charles Chipiez (1882–1914).

== Works ==
- Perrot, Georges; Guillaume, Edmond [in French]; Delbet, Jules [in French] (1862), Exploration archéologique de la Galatie et de la Bithynie, d'une partie de la Mysie, de la Phrygie, de la Cappadoce et du Pont, exécutée en 1861, vol. 1–2, Paris: Firmin Didot (reprinted 1872, vols. 1–2)
- Perrot, Georges (1864), Souvenirs d'un voyage en Asie Mineure, Paris: Michel Lévy Frères
- Perrot, Georges (1867), Essais sur le droit public et privé de la République athénienne. Le Droit public, Paris: Ernest Thorin (reprinted 1869)
- Perrot, Georges (1873), L'Éloquence politique et judiciaire à Athènes I: Les Précurseurs de Démosthène, Paris: Hachette
- Perrot, Georges (1875), Mémoires d'archéologie, d'épigraphie et d'histoire, Paris: Didier
- Perrot, Georges; Chipiez, Charles (1882–1914), Histoire de l'art dans l'antiquité. Égypte, Assyrie, Phénicie, Judée, Asie Mineure, Perse, Grèce, Etrurie, Rome, Paris: Hachette
  - Vol. 1 (1882): L'Égypte
  - Vol. 2 (1884): Chaldée et Assyrie
  - Vol. 3 (1885): Phénicie, Cypre
  - Vol. 4 (1887): Judée. Sardaigne, Syrie, Cappadoce
  - Vol. 5 (1890): Perse. Phrygie, Lydie et Carie, Lycie
  - Vol. 6 (1894): La Grèce primitive. L'art mycénien
  - Vol. 7 (1898): La Grèce de l'épopée. La Grèce archaïque (le temple)
  - Vol. 8 (1903): La Grèce archaïque. La sculpture
  - Vol. 9 (1911): La Grèce archai͏̈que. La glyptique, la numismatique, la peinture, la céramique
  - Vol. 10 (1914): La Grèce archai͏̈que. La céramique d'Athènes
- Perrot, Georges (1904), Praxitèle: étude critique, Paris: Henri Laurens
- Boissier, Gaston; Darboux, Gaston; Perrot, Georges; Picot, Georges; Roujon, Henry; Alfred, Franklin (1907), L'Institut de France, Paris: Henri Laurens
