= Ezekiel 40 =

Book of Ezekiel, chapter 40

- ← chapter 39 chapter 41 →
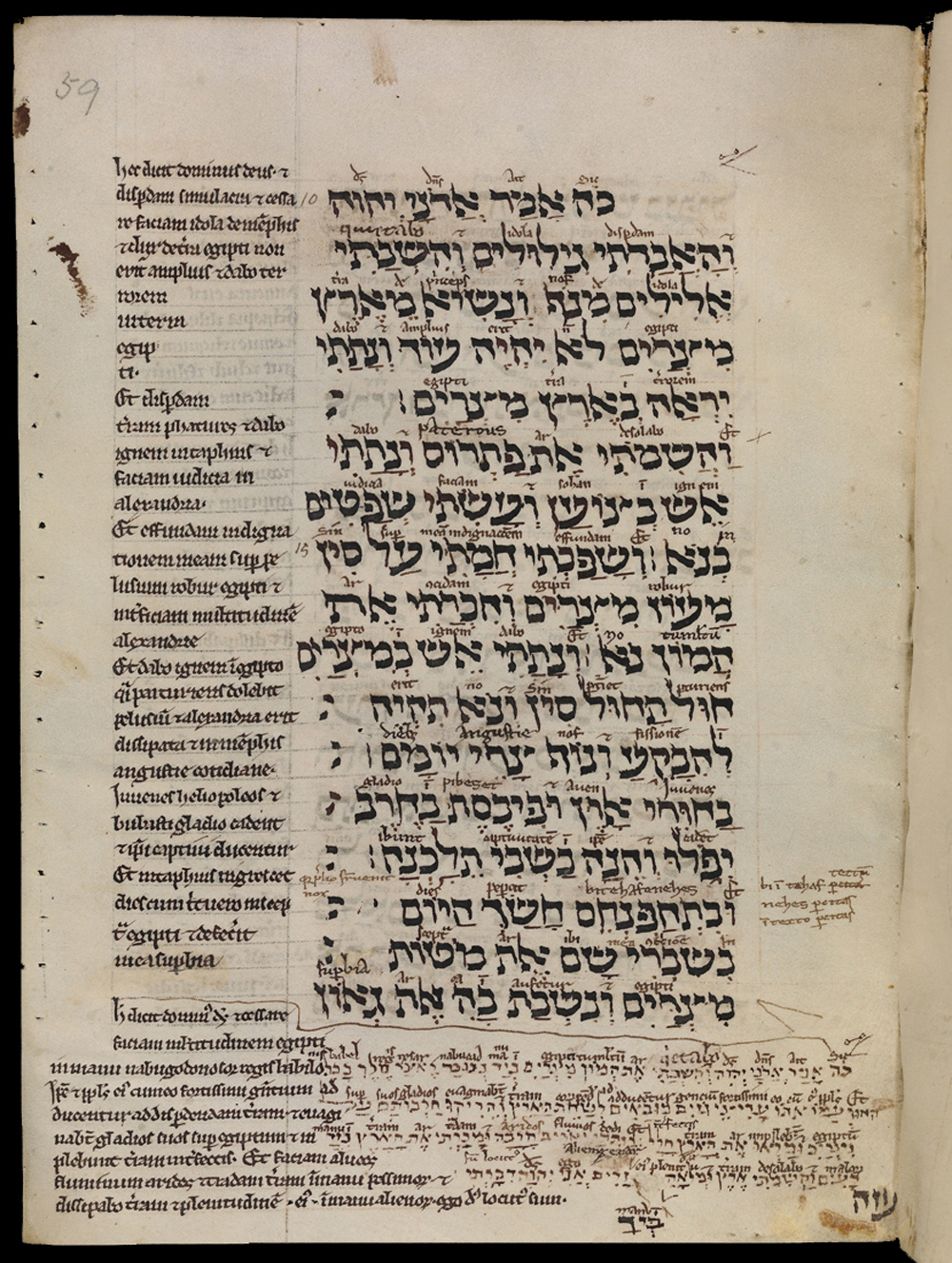
- Book of Ezekiel 30:13–18 in an English manuscript from the early 13th century, MS. Bodl. Or. 62, fol. 59a. A Latin translation appears in the margins with further interlineations above the Hebrew.
- Book: Book of Ezekiel
- Hebrew Bible part: Nevi'im
- Order in the Hebrew part: 7
- Category: Latter Prophets
- Christian Bible part: Old Testament
- Order in the Christian part: 26

Ezekiel 40 is the fortieth chapter of the Book of Ezekiel in the Hebrew Bible. This book contains the prophecies attributed to the prophet and kohen (priest) Ezekiel, and is one of the Books of the Prophets. The Jerusalem Bible refers to the final section of Ezekiel, chapters 40-48, as "the Torah of Ezekiel", "a blueprint for the religious and political rehabilitation of the Israelite nation in Palestine". This chapter describes Ezekiel's vision of a future Temple.

== Text ==
The original text was written in the Biblical Hebrew. This chapter is divided into 49 verses.

=== Textual witnesses ===
Some early manuscripts containing the text of this chapter in Hebrew are of the Masoretic Text (𝕸), which includes the Codex Cairensis (895), Codex Babylonicus Petropolitanus (916), Aleppo Codex (10th century), and Leningrad Codex (1008).

There is also a translation into Koine Greek known as the Septuagint, made in the last few centuries BC. Extant ancient manuscripts of the Septuagint version include Codex Vaticanus (B; $\mathfrak{G}$^{B}; 4th century), Codex Alexandrinus (A; $\mathfrak{G}$^{A}; 5th century) and Codex Marchalianus (Q; $\mathfrak{G}$^{Q}; 6th century). (Note: Ezekiel is missing from the extant Codex Sinaiticus.)

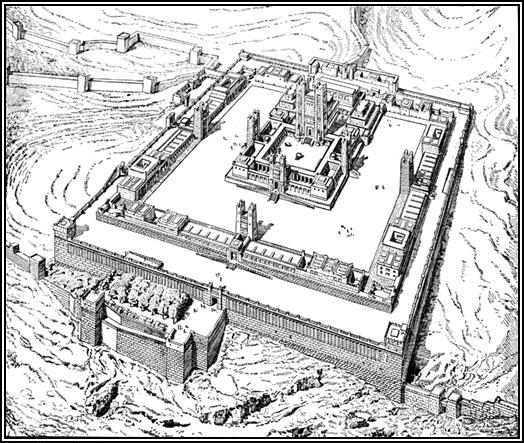
The visionary Ezekiel Temple plan drawn by the 19th-century French architect and Bible scholar Charles Chipiez

== The beginning of the temple measurements (verses 1–5) ==
This is the beginning of Ezekiel's final vision which he dated to the start of a Jubilee year, "in the 25th year of our exile" verse 1). In this vision Ezekiel is transported to the land of Israel (cf. Ezekiel 8:3), where he is placed on 'a very high mountain on which was a structure like a city to the south' (verse 2), evidently referring to Mount Zion (exalted as in Isaiah 2:2 and Micah 4:1) and a new city to replace the devastated Jerusalem. A man gleaming 'like bronze' (verse 3; cf. Ezekiel 1:7; 1:27; 8:2) appears with a measuring rod to measure the various dimensions of the temple complex and instructs Ezekiel to record the measurements to be passed on to the Israelites. The measuring actions continues to Ezekiel 42, but this single vision comprises the last nine chapters of the book (chapter 40–48), as Ezekiel tours the restored, pure temple and then watches the Divine Warrior's return and enthronement (in contrast to the vision in chapters 8–11, which record Ezekiel touring the defiled temple before watching the departure of the Warrior).

=== Verse 1 ===
In the twenty-fifth year of our captivity, at the beginning of the year, on the tenth day of the month, in the fourteenth year after the city was captured,
on the very same day the hand of the Lord was upon me; and He took me there.

- The date corresponds to the 25th anniversary of Ezekiel's exile, April 28, 573 BCE, which is also the date given in an analysis by German theologian Bernhard Lang. The Jerusalem Bible notes the date as September–October 573. According to the Talmud (b. Arak. 12a), this date falls on the Day of Atonement (Yom Kippur) and marks the start of the seventeenth (and last) Jubilee year in history.

=== Verse 4 ===
And the man said to me,

"Son of man, look with your eyes and hear with your ears,

and fix your mind on everything I show you;

for you were brought here so that I might show them to you.

Declare to the house of Israel everything you see."

- "Son of man": this phrase is used 93 times to address Ezekiel.

=== Verse 5 ===
Now there was a wall all around the outside of the temple.
In the man's hand was a measuring rod six cubits long, each being a cubit and a handbreadth;
and he measured the width of the wall structure, one rod; and the height, one rod.

- "A cubit and a handbreadth": a cubit is about "44.4 cm or 17.5 in."; a handbreadth (or "four fingers thick") is about "7.4 cm or 2.9 in." Epiphanius of Salamis, in his treatise On Weights and Measures, describes that: "the part from the elbow to the wrist and the palm of the hand is called the cubit, the middle finger of the cubit measure being also extended at the same time and there being added below (it) the span, that is, of the hand, taken all together."

== The Eastern Gateway of the Temple (verses 6–16) ==
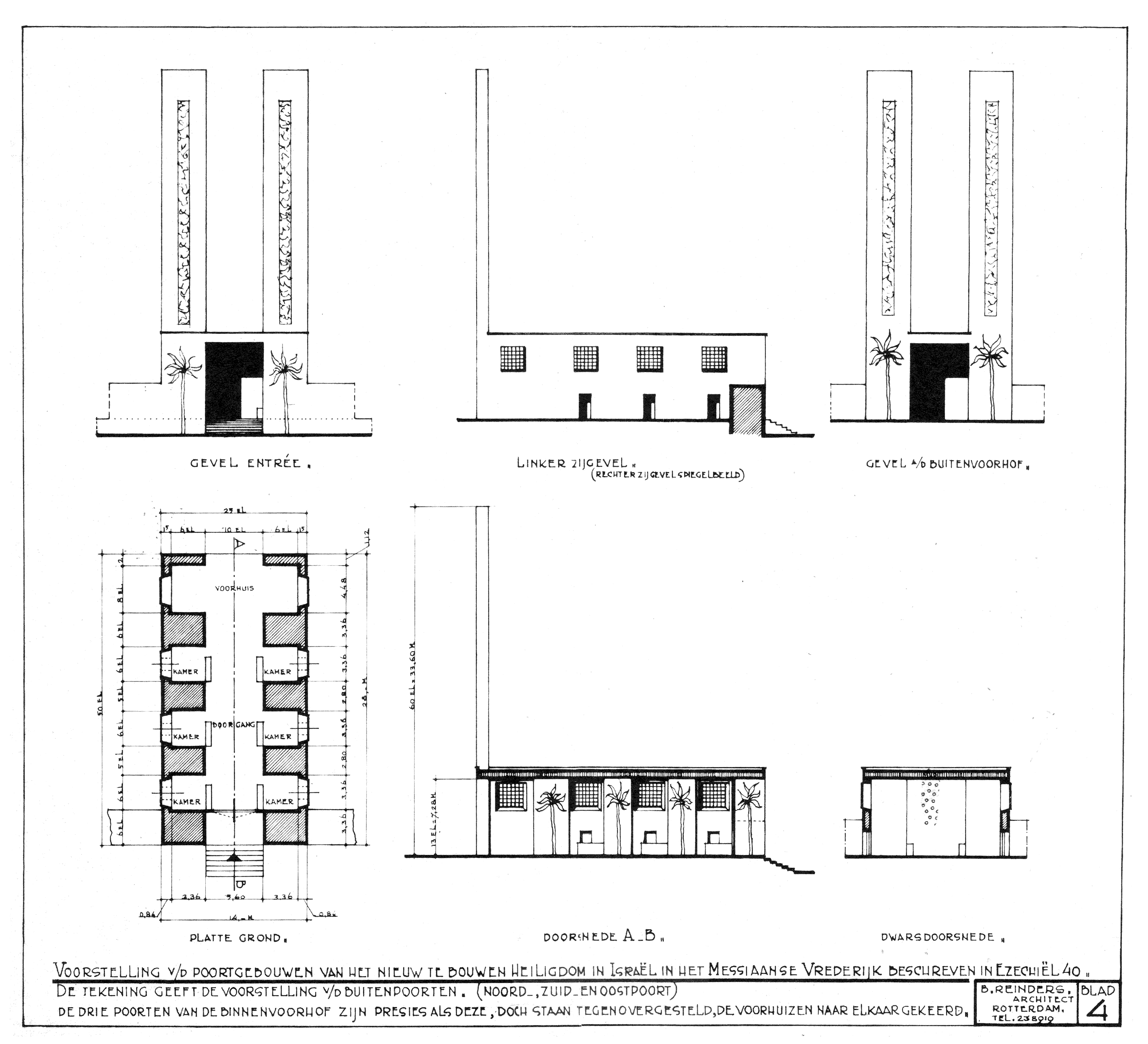
Gateways of Ezekiel's Temple, as described in the Book of Ezekiel, drawn by the Dutch architect Bartelmeüs Reinders (1893–1979)

Ezekiel records the blueprint of the eastern gateway (which is similar to northern and southern gates) based on the action of the man acting as his guide:

Then he went to the gateway which faced east; and he went up its stairs and measured the threshold of the gateway, which was one rod wide, and the other threshold was one rod wide. Each gate chamber was one rod long and one rod wide; between the gate chambers was a space of five cubits; and the threshold of the gateway by the vestibule of the inside gate was one rod. He also measured the vestibule of the inside gate, one rod. Then he measured the vestibule of the gateway, eight cubits; and the gateposts, two cubits. The vestibule of the gate was on the inside. In the eastern gateway were three gate chambers on one side and three on the other; the three were all the same size; also the gateposts were of the same size on this side and that side. He measured the width of the entrance to the gateway, ten cubits; and the length of the gate, thirteen cubits. There was a space in front of the gate chambers, one cubit on this side and one cubit on that side; the gate chambers were six cubits on this side and six cubits on that side. Then he measured the gateway from the roof of one gate chamber to the roof of the other; the width was twenty-five cubits, as door faces door. He measured the gateposts, sixty cubits high, and the court all around the gateway extended to the gatepost. From the front of the entrance gate to the front of the vestibule of the inner gate was fifty cubits. There were beveled window frames in the gate chambers and in their intervening archways on the inside of the gateway all around, and likewise in the vestibules. There were windows all around on the inside. And on each gatepost were palm trees.

— Ezekiel 40:6–16

The Jerusalem Bible argues that "these elaborate gates" would be built "to enable a watch to be kept on those who enter" in order to ensure that the Temple could be kept pure from foreigners and sinners.

== See also ==
- Israel
- Levi
- New Jerusalem Dead Sea Scroll
- Third Temple
- Zadok
- Related Bible parts: 1 Kings 6, 2 Chronicles 3, Isaiah 2, Ezekiel 33, Ezekiel 41, Ezekiel 48, Daniel 10, Revelation 21

== Sources ==
- Bromiley, Geoffrey W. (1995). International Standard Bible Encyclopedia: vol. iv, Q-Z. Eerdmans. ISBN 9780802837844.
- Brown, Francis; Briggs, Charles A.; Driver, S. R. (1994). The Brown-Driver-Briggs Hebrew and English Lexicon (reprint ed.). Hendrickson Publishers. ISBN 978-1565632066.
- Clements, Ronald E (1996). Ezekiel. Westminster John Knox Press. ISBN 9780664252724.
- Galambush, J. (2007). "25. Ezekiel". In Barton, John; Muddiman, John (eds.). The Oxford Bible Commentary (first (paperback) ed.). Oxford University Press. pp. 533–562. ISBN 978-0199277186.
- Gesenius, H. W. F. (1979) [1846]. Gesenius' Hebrew and Chaldee Lexicon to the Old Testament Scriptures: Numerically Coded to Strong's Exhaustive Concordance, with an English Index. Translated by Tregelles, Samuel Prideaux (7th ed.). Baker Book House.
- Joyce, Paul M. (2009). Ezekiel: A Commentary. Continuum. ISBN 9780567483614.
- Kee, Howard Clark; Meyers, Eric M.; Rogerson, John; Levine, Amy-Jill; Saldarini, Anthony J. (2008). Chilton, Bruce (ed.). The Cambridge Companion to the Bible (2, revised ed.). Cambridge University Press. ISBN 9780521691406.
- Würthwein, Ernst (1995). The Text of the Old Testament. Translated by Rhodes, Erroll F. Grand Rapids, MI: Wm. B. Eerdmans. ISBN 0-8028-0788-7.
