= Revelation 21 =

- ← chapter 20 chapter 22 →
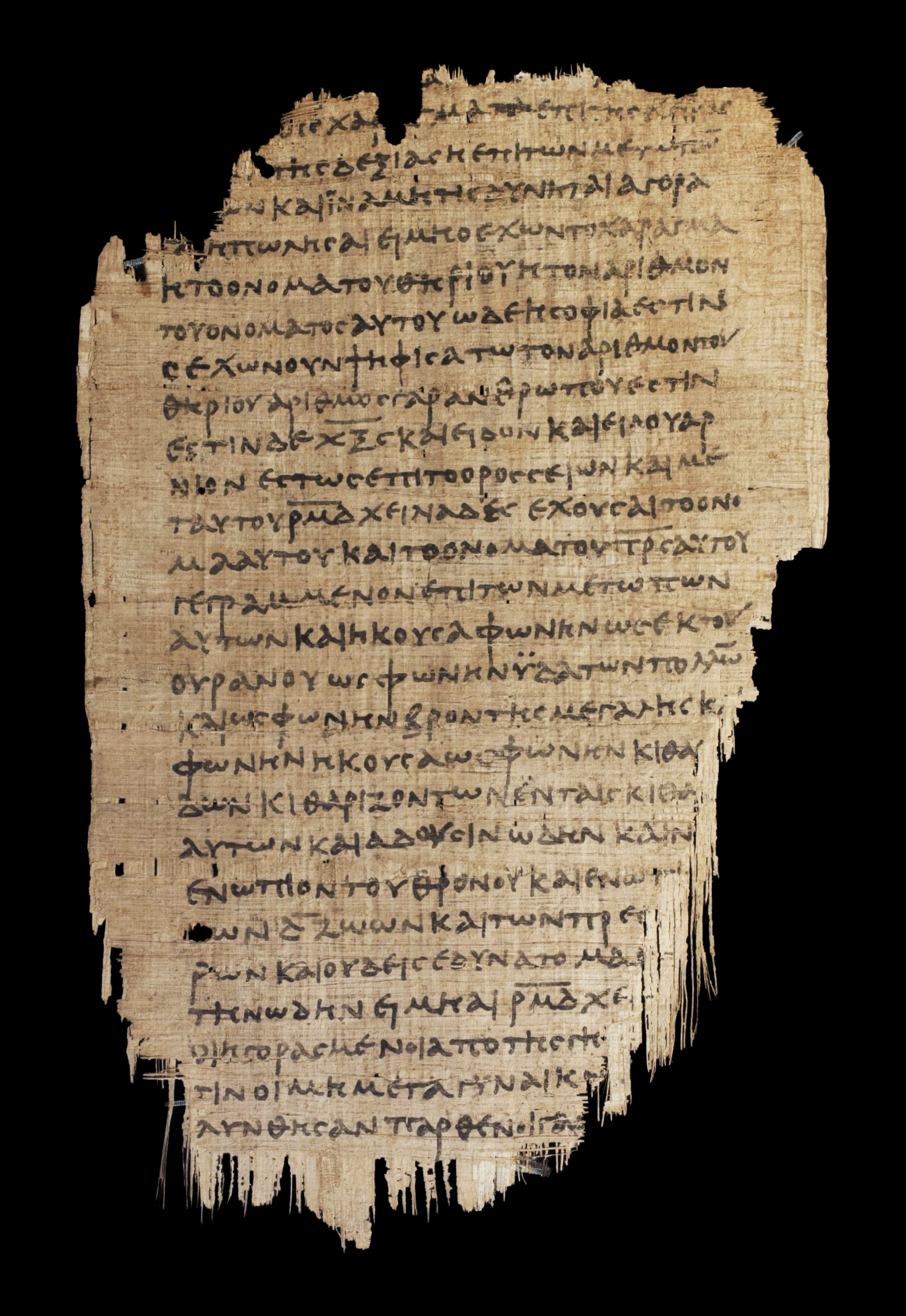
- Revelation 13:16–14:4 on Papyrus 47 from the third century.
- Book: Book of Revelation
- Category: Apocalypse
- Christian Bible part: New Testament
- Order in the Christian part: 27

Revelation 21 is the twenty-first chapter of the Book of Revelation in the New Testament of the Christian Bible. This chapter contains the accounts of "the new heaven and the new earth", followed by the appearance of the New Jerusalem, "prepared as a bride".

== Text ==
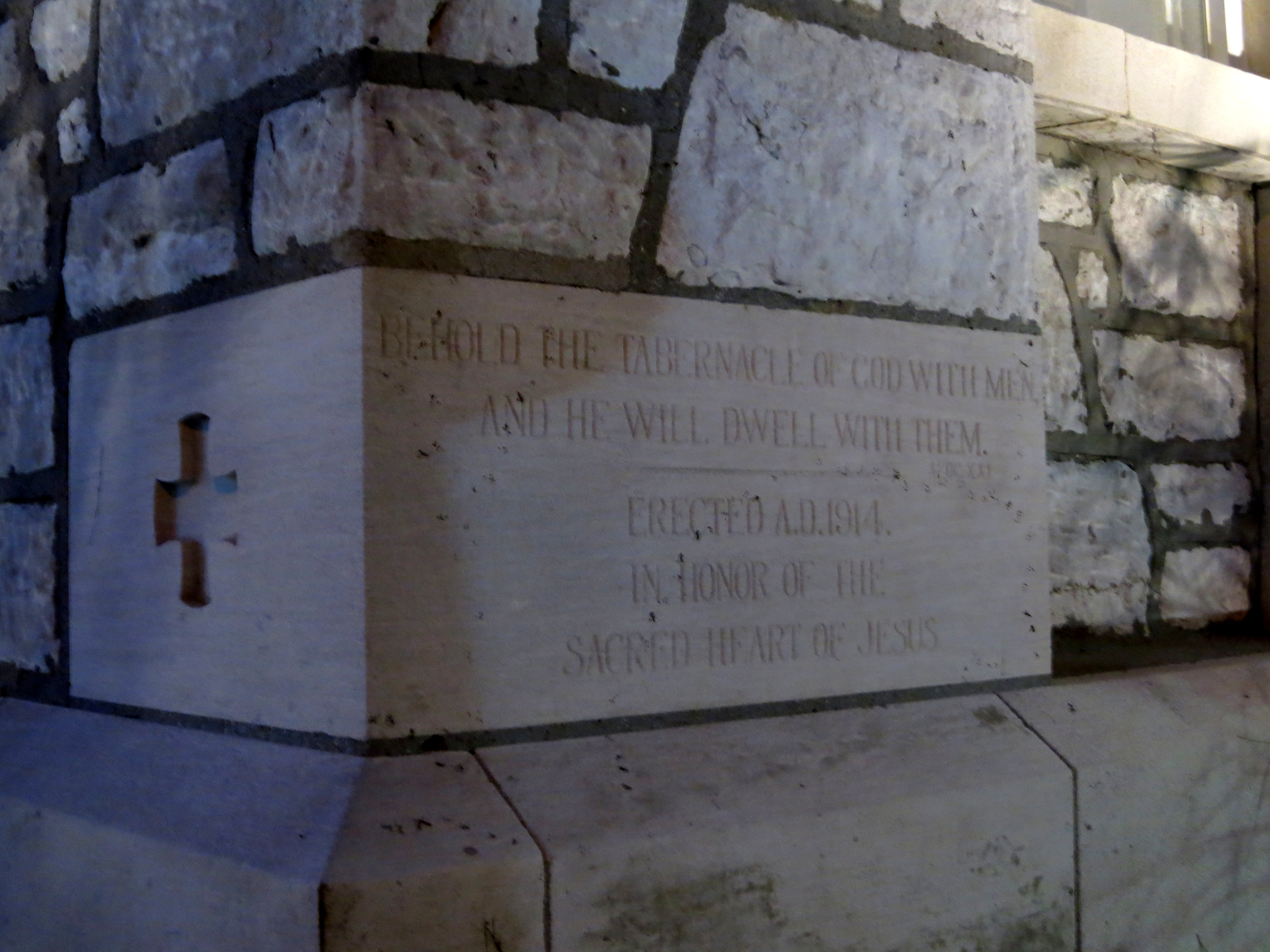
Revelation 21:3 on the exterior cornerstone of Sacred Heart Catholic Church (Columbia, Missouri).

The original text was written in Koine Greek. This chapter is divided into 27 verses.

=== Textual witnesses ===
Some early manuscripts containing the text of this chapter are among others: (Note: The Book of Revelation is missing from Codex Vaticanus. and this chapter is missing from Codex Ephraemi Rescriptus.)

- Codex Sinaiticus (330–360)
- Codex Alexandrinus (400–440)

=== Old Testament references ===
- Revelation 20:1: Isaiah 65:17
- Revelation 20:6: Isaiah 55:1
- Revelation 20:23: Isaiah 60:19
- Revelation 20:24: Isaiah 60:3
- Revelation 20:25: Isaiah 60:11

=== New Testament references ===
- Revelation 21:1: 2 Peter 3:13
- Revelation 21:4: Revelation 7:17
- Revelation 21:5: 2 Corinthians 5:17
- Revelation 21:6: Revelation 1:8; Revelation 22:13

== A new heaven and a new earth (21:1–8) ==
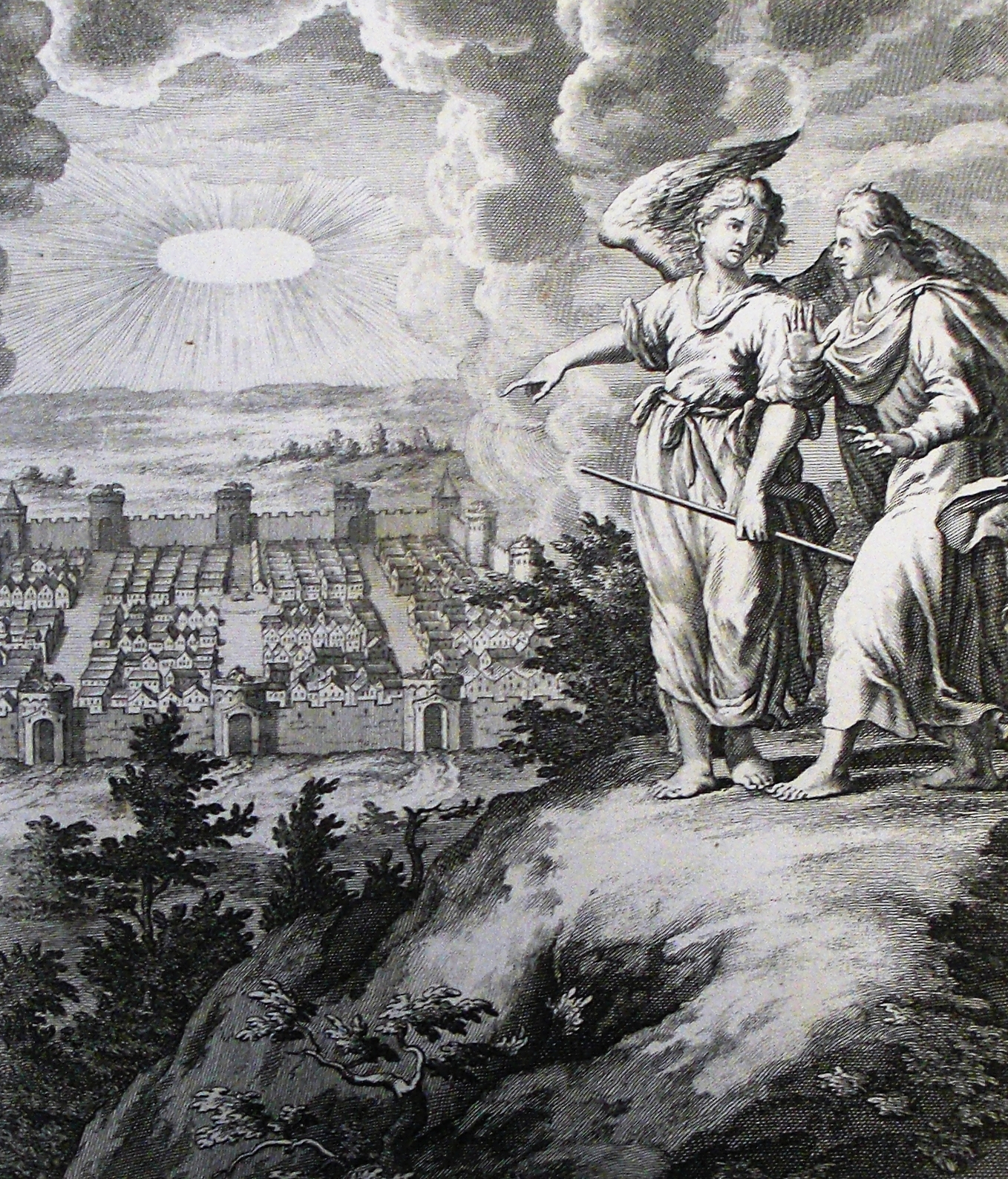
A new heaven and new earth. Revelation 21. Apocalypse 37. Scheits. Phillip Medhurst Collection.

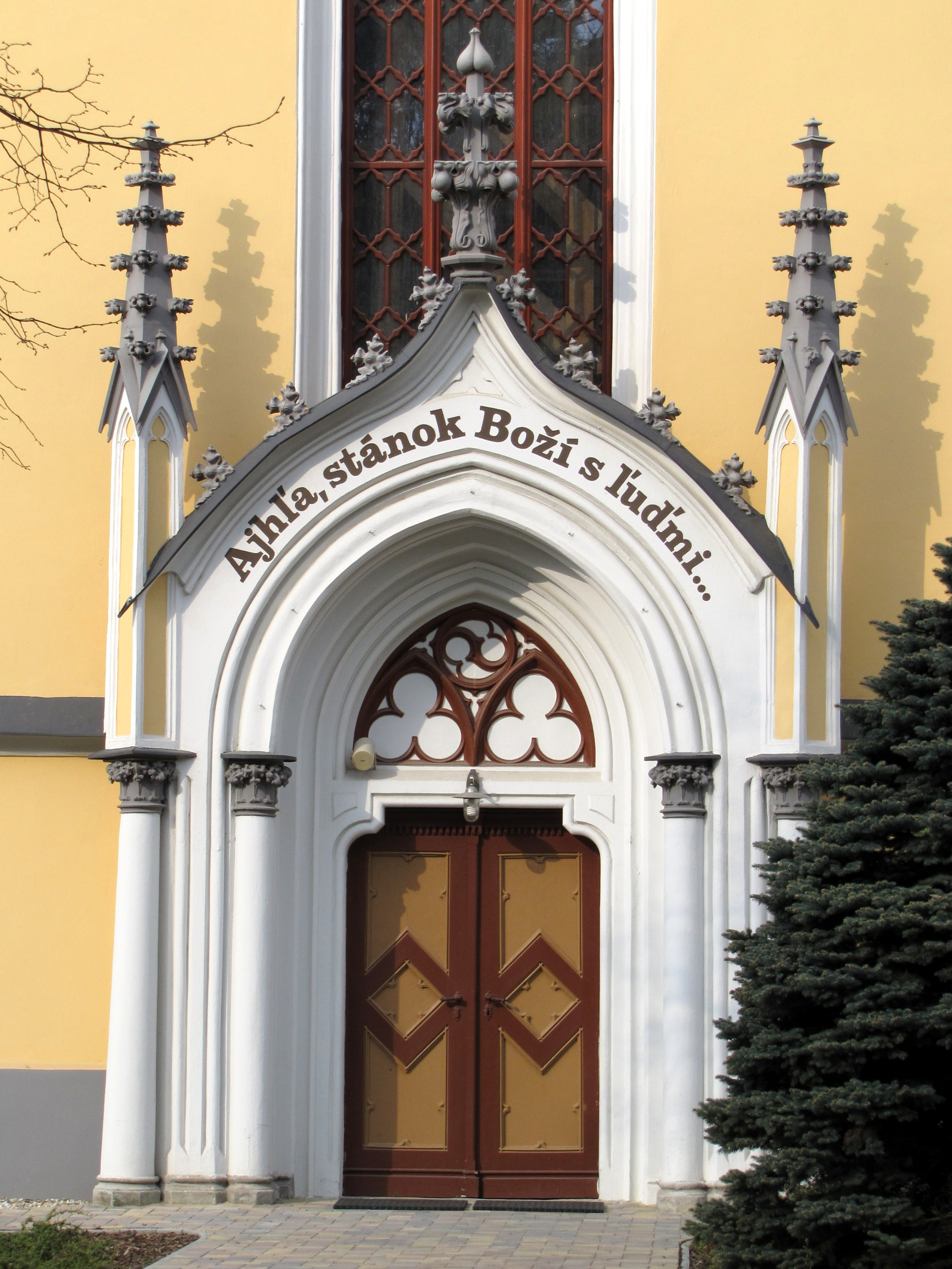
Revelation 21:3 quoted on a church in Slovakia: "Behold! God's dwelling-place is among the people…"

=== Verse 1 ===
Now I saw a new heaven and a new earth, for the first heaven and the first earth had passed away. Also there was no more sea.

— Revelation 21:1

The Nonconformist minister Alexander Maclaren interprets "a new heaven and a new earth" as meaning "a renovated condition of humanity" and suggests that "and the sea is no more" is "probably ... to be taken in a symbolic sense, as shadowing forth the absence of unruly power, of mysterious and hostile forces, of estranging gulfs of separation". Referring to the island of Patmos where the writer experienced his vision, Maclaren continues, "The sad and solitary and estranging ocean that raged around his little rock sanctuary has passed away for ever".

=== Verse 2 ===
Then I, John, saw the holy city, New Jerusalem, coming down out of heaven from God, prepared as a bride adorned for her husband.

— Revelation 21:2

The name John appears in the King James Version and New King James Version but is generally omitted in other English translations.

=== Verse 6 ===
And he said to me, "It is done! I am the Alpha and the Omega, the beginning and the end. To the thirsty I will give from the spring of the water of life without payment."

- "It is done": from Greek Γέγοναν, Gegonan, alluding that "the things promised (plural) have come to pass". Whereas in Revelation 16:17 the statement "it is done" (Greek: Γέγονεν, Gegonen) signifies 'the completion of the wrath of God', here it is 'at the making of all things new'.
- "Without payment" (KJV: "freely"): from Greek δωρεάν, dōrean, "a free, unmerited gift".

=== Verse 7 ===
The one who conquers will inherit these things, and I will be his God and he will be my son.

=== Verse 8 ===
”But cowards, unbelievers, the corrupt, murderers, the immoral, those who practice witchcraft, idol worshipers, and all liars—their fate is in the fiery lake of burning sulfur. This is the second death.”

== The new Jerusalem (21:9–27) ==
=== Verses 9–11 ===
^{9}Then one of the seven angels who had the seven bowls filled with the seven last plagues came to me and talked with me, saying, "Come, I will show you the bride, the Lamb's wife." ^{10}And he carried me away in the Spirit to a great and high mountain, and showed me the great city, the holy Jerusalem, descending out of heaven from God, ^{11}having the glory of God. Her light was like a most precious stone, like a jasper stone, clear as crystal.

— Revelation 21:9–11

The beginning part of this section (verses 9–10) forms a parallel with Revelation 17:1–3, which is similar to the parallel between Revelation 19:9–10 and Revelation 22:6–9, indicating a distinct marking of a pair of passages about Babylon and the New Jerusalem with Revelation 19:11–21:8 as a transition from the destruction of Babylon to the arrival of the New Jerusalem.

=== Verse 14 ===
Now the wall of the city had twelve foundations, and on them were the names of the twelve apostles of the Lamb.

— Revelation 21:14

W H Simcox, in the Cambridge Bible for Schools and Colleges, observes that St John the Apostle (if he was the author) "does not notice his own name being written there".

=== Verses 15–21 ===
The ground plan of the New Jerusalem is shown to be a square (cf. Ezekiel 40:3), '12000 stadia in each direction' (verse 16), but the general form is actually a 'perfect cube', unlike any 'city ever imagined', but 'like the holy of holies' in Solomon's Temple in Jerusalem (1 Kings 6:20). The New Jerusalem has no temple (verse 22), because 'the whole city is the holiest place of God's presence'.

=== Verses 22–27 ===
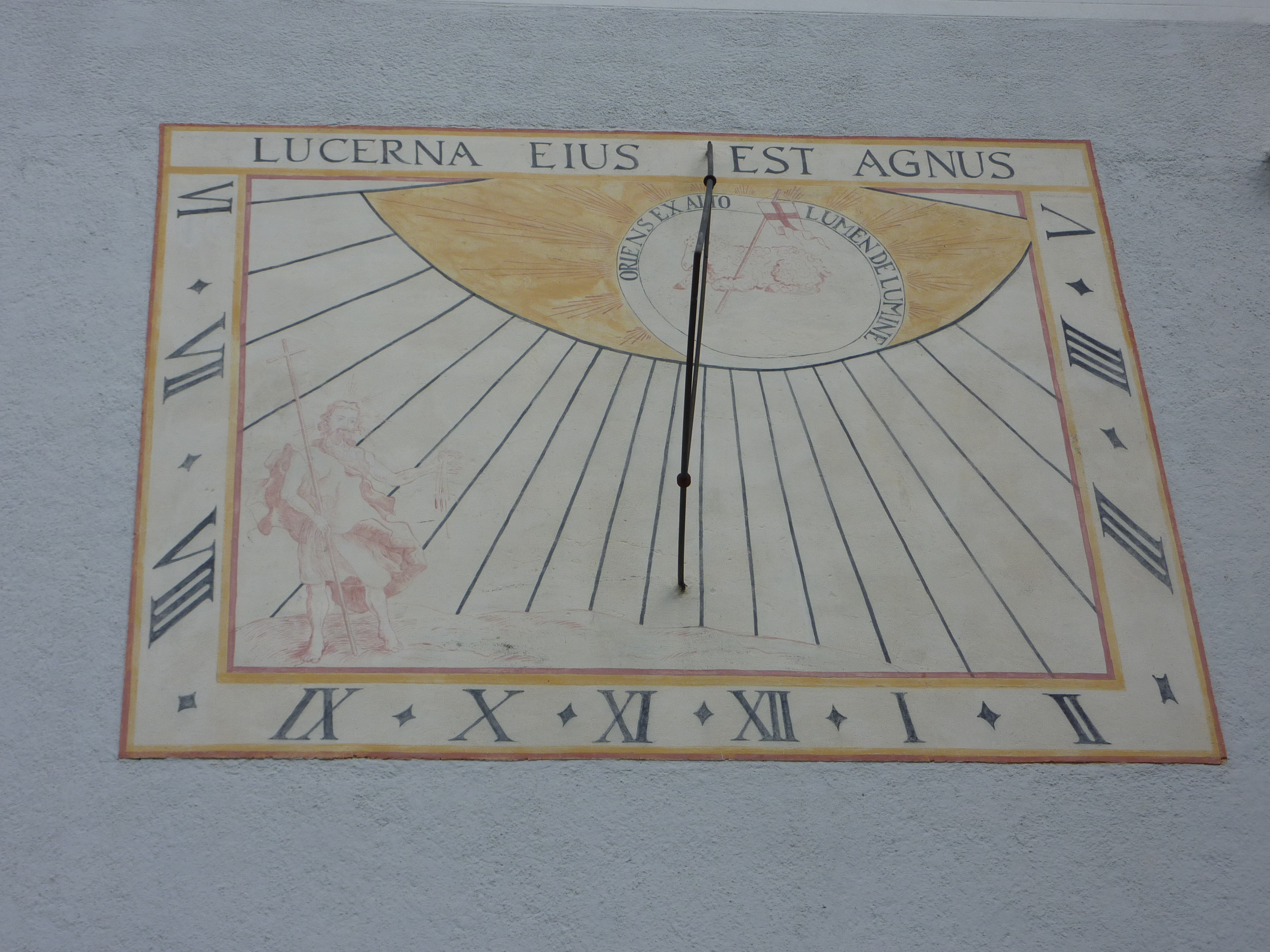
Sundial in Kirchberg am Walde quoting Rev 21:23: "the Lamb is its lamp."

But there shall by no means enter it anything that defiles, or causes an abomination or a lie, but only those who are written in the Lamb's Book of Life.

— Revelation 21:27

The description of the New Jerusalem in many ways is in agreement with the models in the Old Testament and apocryphal literature (Isaiah 52:1; 54:11–12; 60; Ezekiel 40:2–5; 47:1–12; 48:30–34; Zechariah 14:6–21; Tobit 13:16–17), except for the absence of a temple in the new city. The New Jerusalem is called in the Book of Ezekiel as 'The Lord is There' (Ezekiel 48:35) and in the Book of Zechariah the whole city is declared as holy as the temple (Zechariah 14:20–21; cf. Isaiah 52:1).

== See also ==
- Alpha and Omega
- Jesus
- John's vision of the Son of Man
- Names and titles of Jesus in the New Testament
- New Earth (Christianity)
- New Jerusalem Dead Sea Scroll
- Related Bible parts: Ezekiel 40, Ezekiel 48, Revelation 1, Revelation 19, Revelation 22

== Bibliography ==
- Bauckham, Richard (2007). "81. Revelation". In Barton, John; Muddiman, John (eds.). The Oxford Bible Commentary (first (paperback) ed.). Oxford University Press. pp. 1287–1306. ISBN 978-0199277186.
