= New Jerusalem Dead Sea Scroll =

Discovered among the Dead Sea Scrolls near Qumran were fragments of a scroll which describes New Jerusalem in minute detail. The New Jerusalem Scroll appears to contain an apocalyptic vision, an eschatological vision of the city and the temple, although, being fragmented, it is hard to categorize. Written in Aramaic, the text describes a vast city, rectangular in shape, with twelve gates and encircled by a long wall. Similar descriptions appear in Revelation 21–22 (and possibly Ezekiel 40–48) and comparison to the Temple Scroll (also found near Qumran) shows many similarities despite no direct literary links between the two.

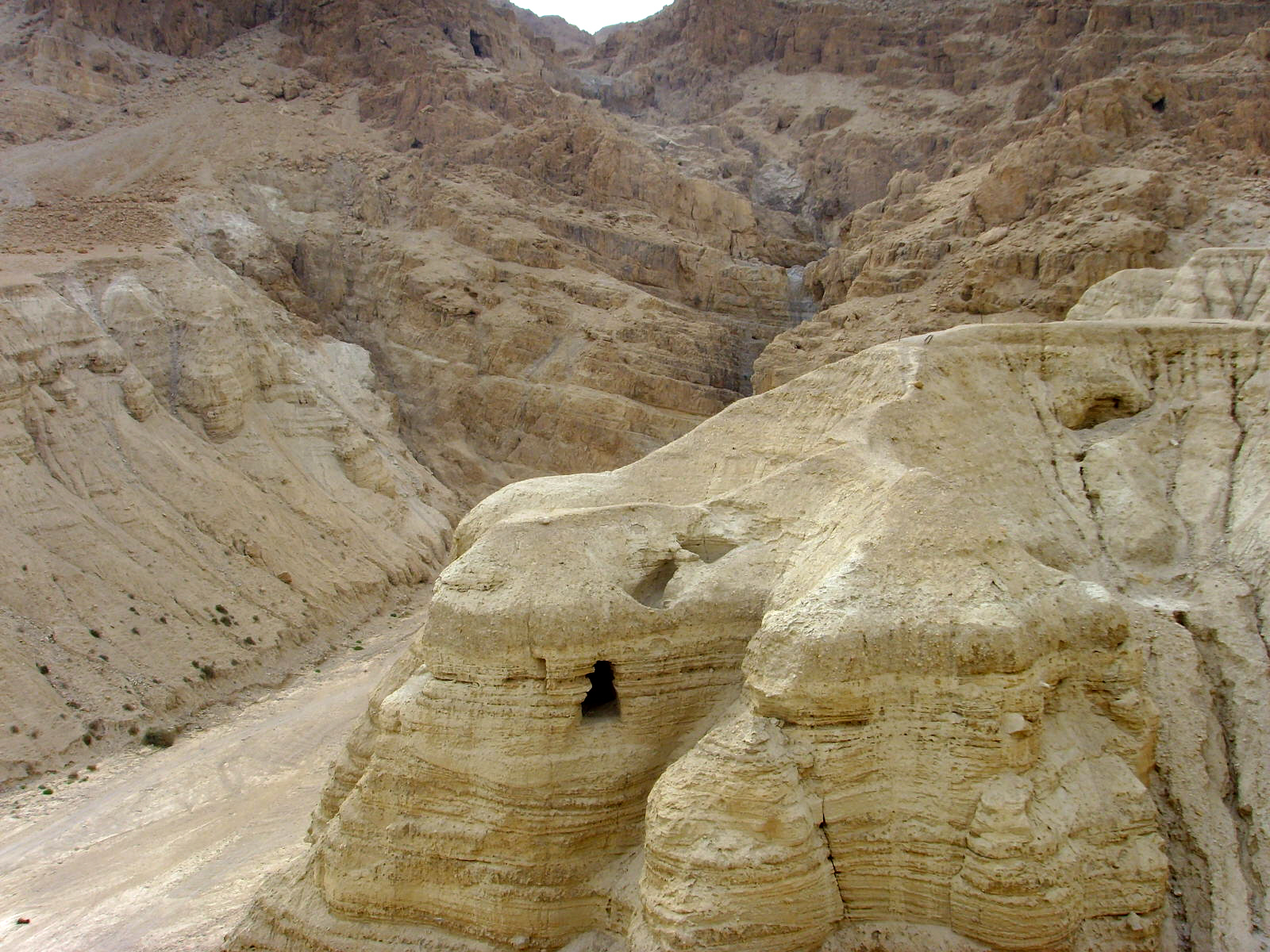
Qumran, Cave 4. Location where a copy of the New Jerusalem Scroll was found.: Manuscript Type: / Non-Biblical Compositions; Composition Type: / Parabiblical Texts; Language: / Aramaic; Script: / Square; Material: / Parchment

== Scroll fragments ==
Multiple copies or fragments of copies of the New Jerusalem Scroll were discovered within the caves surrounding Qumran. Images for each fragment are available at the Leon Levy Dead Sea Scrolls Digital Library.

Reference Number	Secondary Reference	Composition Type	Compositional Date	Cave
1Q32	1QNJ	Parabiblical Texts	100–50 BCE	1
2Q24	2QNJ	Parabiblical Texts	100–50 BCE	2
4QNJ-a	4Q554	Parabiblical Texts	100–50 BCE	4
4QNJ-b	4Q554a	Parabiblical Texts	100–50 BCE	4
4QNF-c	4Q555	Parabiblical Texts	100–50 BCE	4
5QNJ	5Q15	Parabiblical Texts	100–50 BCE	5
11QNJ	11Q18	Parabiblical Texts	100–50 BCE	11

== The motif of a 'New' Jerusalem in the Bible and at Qumran ==
=== Temple Scroll ===
Scholars debate the potential of a relationship between New Jerusalem and the Temple Scroll, another Qumran text featuring similar motifs. An essay by B.Z. Wacholder explains that the New Jerusalem scroll is dependent on the Temple Scroll; the measurements and data go hand in hand. However, in the opinion of Lorenzo DiTommaso, "there are almost no similarities between the two texts in the matter of genre, basic form and content, or architectural urban design. Furthermore, neither text is meaningfully dependent upon the other."

DiTommaso states this because the New Jerusalem scroll is written in Aramaic, in third person of a description of a futuristic city, and described from DiTommaso as "without legislative material". Different measurements are used, such as rods for length and width. In the New Jerusalem no description of other urban cities surrounding the city exists. The description builds from the outside of the city towards the inside.

While the Temple Scroll is written in first person, in the language of Hebrew, and described as legislative. The measurements used in the Temple Scroll are not the same, they do not use rods as a measurement. Lastly, in the Temple scroll it describes cities that are around the 'New Jerusalem'. The description is from the inside out.

Three different descriptions are given about New Jerusalem, from Ezekiel, Revelation and writings found at Qumran. Significant similarities can be drawn between the three.

==== Ezekiel ====
In a vision, Ezekiel (40–48) saw the temple, the city and the land. In a sense, this is a heavenly blueprint. It is a layout for what is to be established after the exile. Rebuilding the temple was meant to glorify Yahweh in everything from its associated structures to its activities. The core of the vision, as Adela Yarbro Collins writes, "... is the narrative that describes how an angel led the prophet through the new sanctuary, a tour that reaches the holy of holies". Steven Tuell divides the description of all this into three sections. First, in 40–43:9, there is a description of the temple and the Lord's arrival to occupy it. Next, there is the law of the temple which is about the liturgy performed by the priests. Finally, the last two chapters deal with the river, land and city. The blueprint described by Ezekiel is believed to be exclusively concerned with restoration after the exile and is completely earth centered; the reconstruction of an earthly temple rather than a heavenly one.

Where is God in all of this? Tuell has the answer, "Ezekiel and his editors agree on the fundamental answer to the question, "where?", it is here, in the midst of God's people, that God will be found".

==== Revelation ====
The author of the Revelation description took some ideas from Ezekiel. For example, it contains the use of the measuring rod which was used to determine the dimensions of the walls, gates, etc. He also took from Isaiah 65:17–18 which describes God creating a new Heaven and Earth. Jerusalem is also to be a "joy and its people a delight". We also see Christian interpretation which sees this idea transferred completely to the eschaton, in order that New Jerusalem comes at the very end of the world. In the Eschatological scenario of Revelation 20–21, there is no place for the Old Jerusalem; there is only the New Jerusalem which comes down from heaven. Florentino Martínez writes that "New Jerusalem here is an entirely new reality, and that the only relation it has to the old is its name. He goes on, "The New Jerusalem metaphor of Revelation represents such a deep transformation of its starting point (Ezekiel and Isaiah) that it is difficult to understand how this can be considered a development of the basic Old Testament texts".

In Revelation 21:9, there is a contrast between the great harlot (Babylon) and the bride of the Lamb (the Holy city of Jerusalem). One is of the earth, symbolizing the passion and evil of man, and the other descends from heaven, completely pure and beautiful. Robert Mounce writes that "The holy city descending from God out of heaven should be understood as a "real event" within the visionary experience ... the visionary terms of a future event which will usher in the eternal state. That the city comes down from God means that the eternal blessedness is not an achievement of man but a gift of God". There is no description of the temple in John's vision as it was in Ezekiel. Mounce writes that this is because "... the symbol has made way for reality. The temple is replaced by us “Gods and Goddesses".

==== Qumran ====
In the non-sectarian documents of Qumran, we find consolation after the temple's destruction (4QTanhumin), with links to Isaiah 40–51 which writes that the temple will be rebuilt and Zion will be restored to its former glory.

According to the sectarian compositions, Jerusalem is ungodly, as we see in the Persherim text. Illegitimate and wicked priesthood occupy it so it is no surprise that the Qumranites abandoned it. At Qumran, they believed themselves to be establishing the true temple since the other had been corrupted. Furthermore, the community itself metaphorically believed that they were the New Jerusalem and the new temple. They also believed that they were commanded to build a temple during the end times as one can read about in the Temple Scroll.

Texts suggest that this Jerusalem has no place at the end of days, such as 1QSa II 4–12. However, others suggest the opposite, that Jerusalem plays an important role in the eschatological sense, such as 4Q177 and 1QM XII 10–16. The latter is a victory hymn which describes how the children of light (people of Qumran) take back the city of Jerusalem.The people of light are then reintroduced into the temple (1QMII 1–5), purifying it and then conduct the final war until victory. Martínez sums up this evidence:

"This seems to be the logical perspective from which to read the description of the city and of the temple of the New Jerusalem text. It is a revelation of the model of the temple and the city that God will build at the end of times. This interpretation is confirmed by the fragmentary reference we find in a copy from Cave to the final war against Kittim, Edom, Moab, Ammon, and Babel. The Old Testament model (the Torah of Ezekiel) has been thoroughly eschatologized and developed into the New Jerusalem along the same lines that we find in other apocalyptic writings (such as the Book of Enoch and the Book of Jubilees). The plans for the city and the temple of the New Jerusalem text represent a city of gigantic dimensions, covered with precious stones, a city that will be built by God at the end of days: not a heavenly Jerusalem, but the very earthly city and the very earthly temple described in the War Scroll, and destined to endure forever."

When comparing the fragments found at Qumran to that of Ezekiel, one may find several parallels. Description of the New Jerusalem (found in fragments in caves 1, 2, 4, 5, and 11) appears to be inspired by Ezekiel. Written in the first person, the narrator is given a tour by an angel which begins outside the city as they work their way into the temple, the dimensions of the city being shown in the process. Furthermore, it is understood that the community believed this city to be made by God himself. It is eschatological city, definitive and everlasting.

In Revelation, the New Jerusalem is to be on a very high, cosmic mountain, as it was in Ezekiel. Description of the New Jerusalem from Qumran and Revelation 21-22 both include descriptions of precious stones adorning the city, suggesting the fulfillment of Isaiah's prophecy. Also, the guidance of the angel and the measuring rod used in Revelation 21:9–10 and 15-17 are modeled on Ezekiel 40-48, as are the same motifs in the description of the New Jerusalem".

== 11Q18 New Jerusalem ==
11Q18 is a Dead Sea Scroll discovered in Cave 11 that speaks of a New Jerusalem.
