= Charles Chipiez =

French architect and Egyptologist (1835–1901)

Charles Chipiez (French pronunciation: [ʃaʁl ʃipje]; 1835–1901) was an influential French architect, Egyptologist, Iranologist, and an avid historian of the ancient world's architecture. He was a teacher at École Spéciale d'Architecture in Paris, France, and helped build the "École Nationale Professionnelle d'Armentières" or the National Professional building of Armentières in 1887.

Chipiez with the help of architect, hellenist, and architectural historian Georges Perrot wrote some of the most detailed description of the architectural achievements of the ancient world in such places as Egypt, Greece, Persia, Lydia, Lycia and Assyria. Chipiez would also create some of the most detailed virtual architectural drawings of the ancient monuments that once stood erect, bringing them to life.

Some of his prominent works with Perrot include History of art in primitive Greece: Mycenian art in 1894, A history of art in Phoenicia and its dependencies in 1885, History of art in Persia in 1892, A history of art in ancient Egypt in 1883, A history of art in Chaldaea & Assyria in 1884, History of art in Phrygia, Lydia, Caria, and Lycia in 1892, and History of art in Sardinia, Judæa, Syria, and Asia Minor in 1890.

Chipiez's drawing reflect his technical acumen as well as his artist abilities. His drawings recreating the facade of Persepolis are among some of the works he has contributed to his publications:

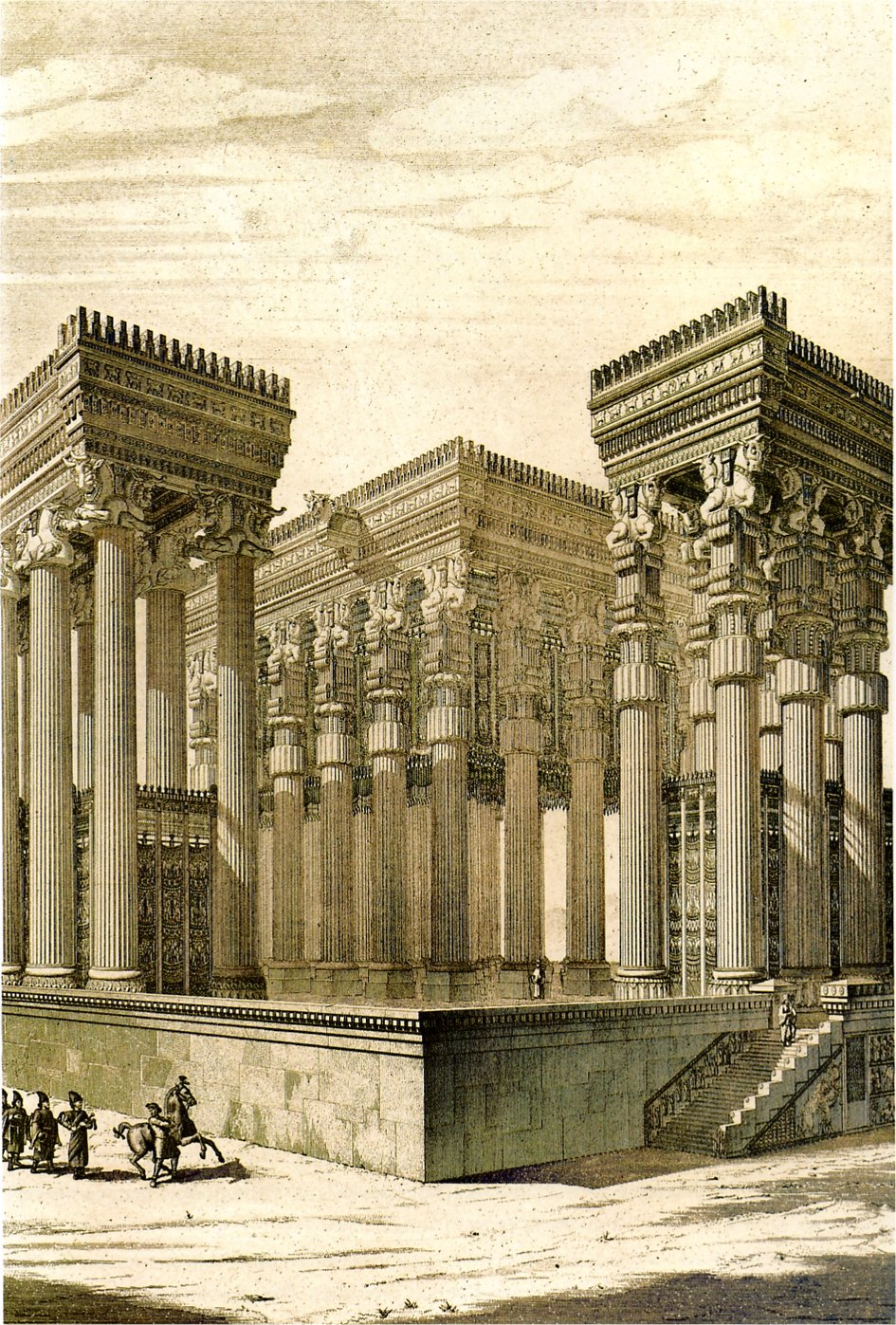
Reconstruction of the Apadana Hall

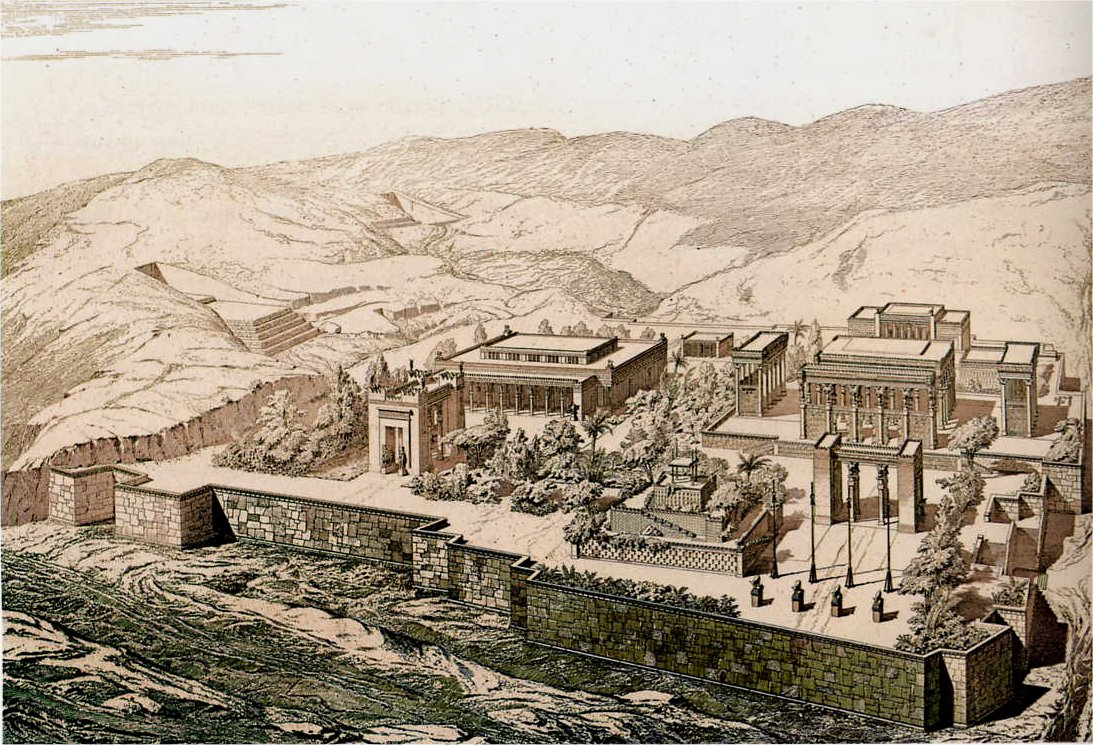
Bird's-eye view of Persepolis

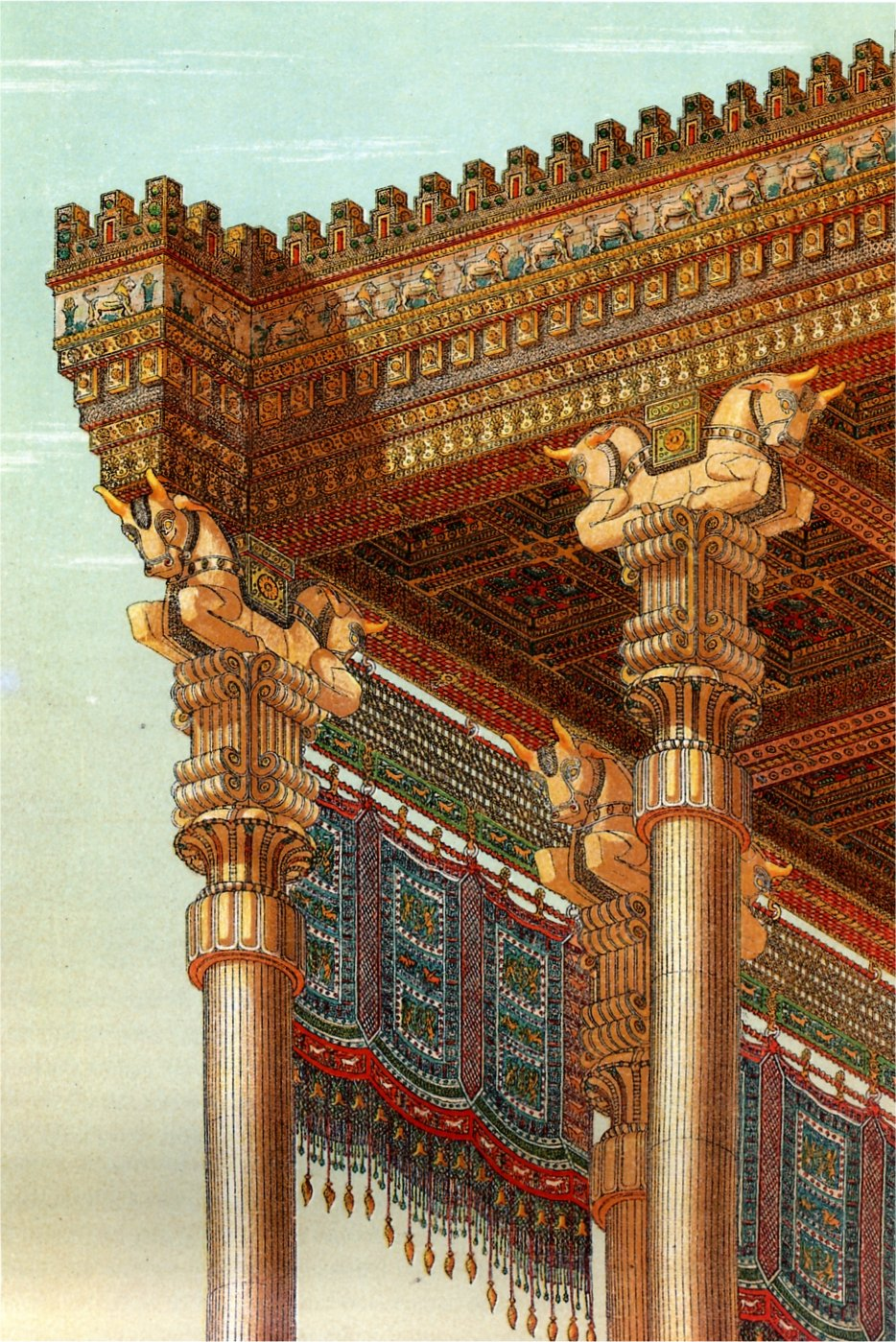
Column detail of Apadana

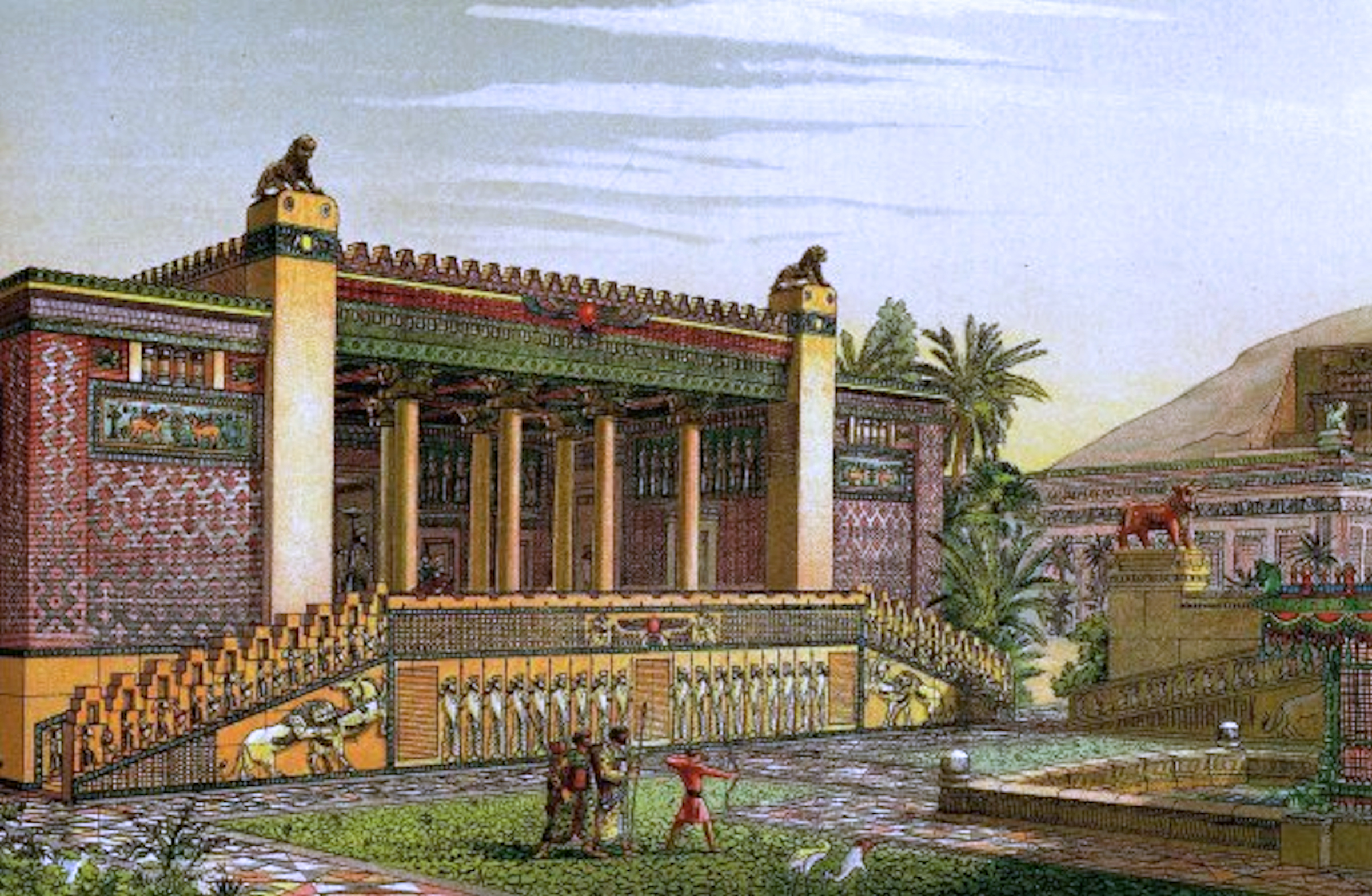
Facade of Palace of Darius
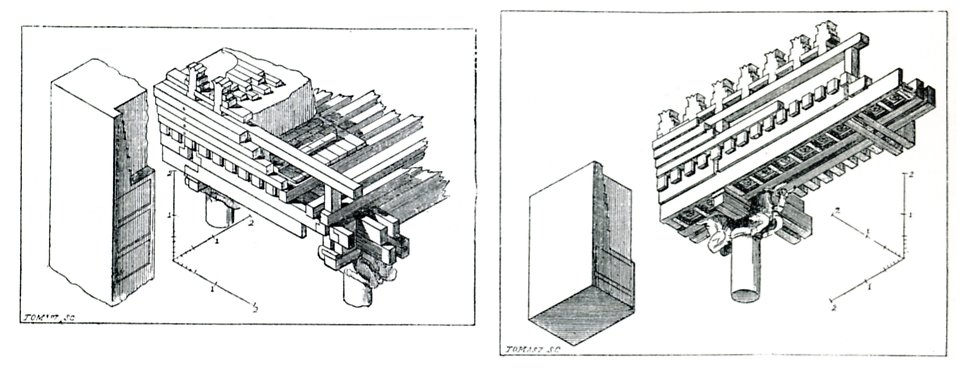
Analysis of the "Tachar" Hall

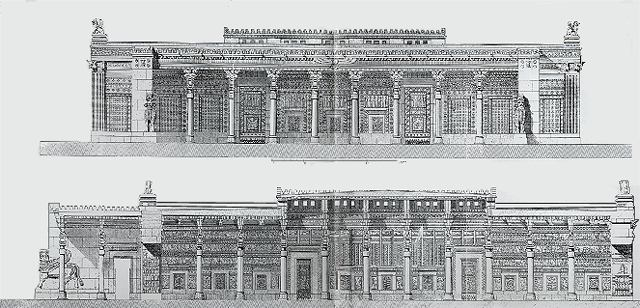
Hall of 100 columns, or "Talar-i Takht"

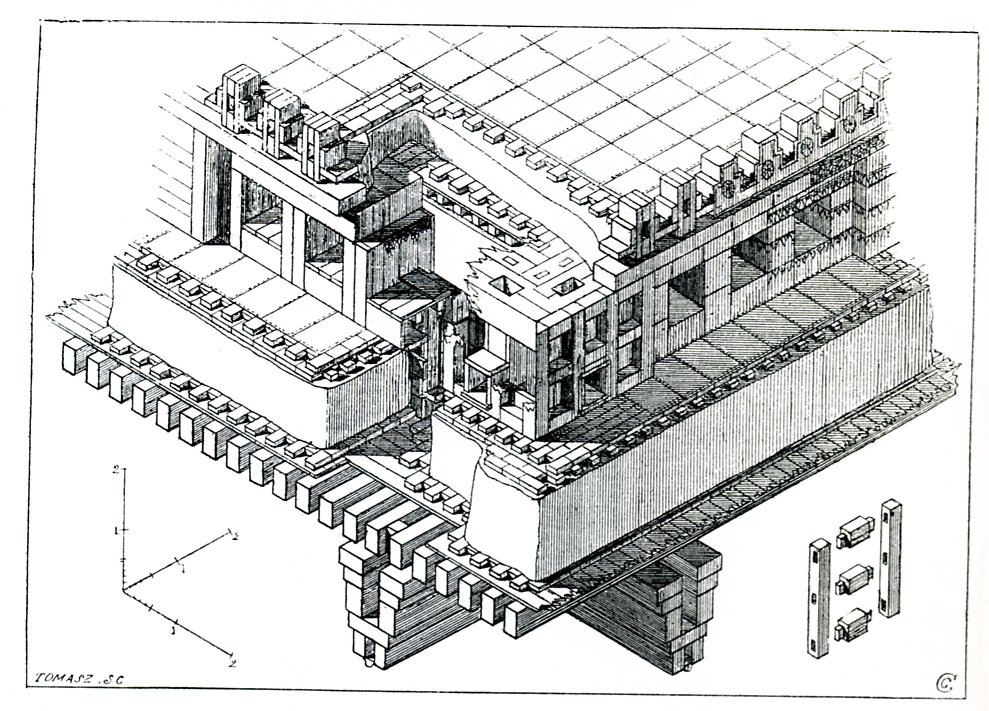
Detail from the roof structure of Persepolis
