= Ezekiel 47 =

Book of Ezekiel, chapter 47

- ← chapter 46 chapter 48 →
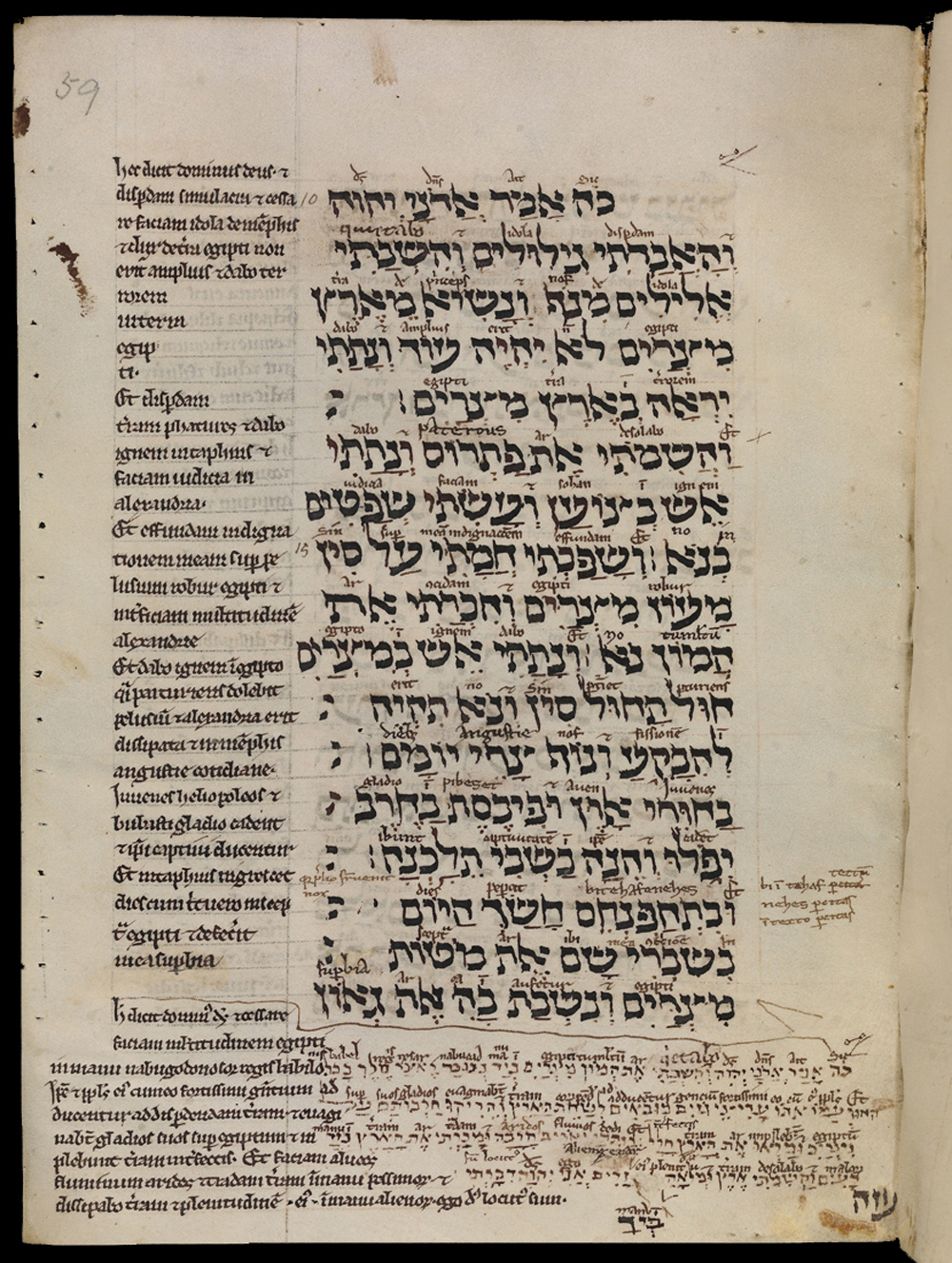
- Book of Ezekiel 30:13–18 in an English manuscript from the early 13th century, MS. Bodl. Or. 62, fol. 59a. A Latin translation appears in the margins with further interlineations above the Hebrew.
- Book: Book of Ezekiel
- Hebrew Bible part: Nevi'im
- Order in the Hebrew part: 7
- Category: Latter Prophets
- Christian Bible part: Old Testament
- Order in the Christian part: 26

Ezekiel 47 is the forty-seventh chapter of the Book of Ezekiel in the Hebrew Bible or the Old Testament of the Christian Bible.

This book contains the prophecies attributed to the prophet/priest Ezekiel, and is one of the Books of the Prophets. The final section of Ezekiel, chapters 40-48, gives the ideal picture of a new temple. The Jerusalem Bible refers to this section as "the Torah of Ezekiel".

This chapter contains Ezekiel's vision of the holy waters (Ezekiel 47:1-5) and their virtue (verses 6–12), the borders of the land (verses 13–21) and the division of the land by lot (verses 22–23). The vision was given on the 25th anniversary of Ezekiel's exile, "April 28, 573 BCE"; 14 years after the fall of Jerusalem and 12 years after the last messages of hope in chapter 39.

== Text ==
The original text was written in the Hebrew language. This chapter is divided into 23 verses.

=== Textual witnesses ===
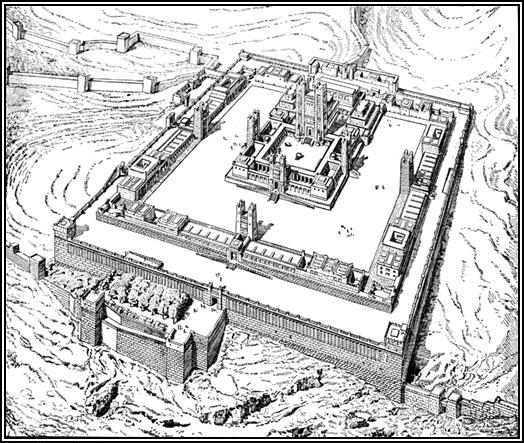
The visionary Ezekiel Temple plan drawn by the 19th-century French architect and Bible scholar Charles Chipiez

Some early manuscripts containing the text of this chapter in Hebrew are of the Masoretic Text tradition, which includes the Codex Cairensis (895), the Petersburg Codex of the Prophets (916), Aleppo Codex (10th century), Codex Leningradensis (1008).

There is also a translation into Koine Greek known as the Septuagint, made in the last few centuries BC. Extant ancient manuscripts of the Septuagint version include Codex Vaticanus (B; $\mathfrak{G}$^{B}; 4th century), Codex Alexandrinus (A; $\mathfrak{G}$^{A}; 5th century) and Codex Marchalianus (Q; $\mathfrak{G}$^{Q}; 6th century). (Note: Ezekiel is missing from the extant Codex Sinaiticus.)

== A life-giving torrent (47:1–12) ==
The portrayal of 'paradise regained' in this section concludes the original vision account, as Ezekiel from a location outside the eastern gate observes water flowing eastward from the temple complex, becoming a broad and swift-flowing stream that provides life for the barren dessert and sweetens the waters of the Dead Sea.

=== Verse 1 ===
An image by Henry Sulley of Ezekiel's Temple, with flowing water.

Then he brought me back to the door of the temple; and there was water, flowing from under the threshold of the temple toward the east, for the front of the temple faced east; the water was flowing from under the right side of the temple, south of the altar.

"He" refers to the man whose appearance was like bronze in Ezekiel 40:3, Ezekiel 46:19 and Ezekiel 47:3.

=== Verse 8 ===
Then he said to me: “This water flows toward the eastern region, goes down into the valley, and enters the sea. When it reaches the sea, its waters are healed.

The river flows into the River Jordan, to the east, and then into the Red Sea.

== The boundaries of the land (47:13–23) ==
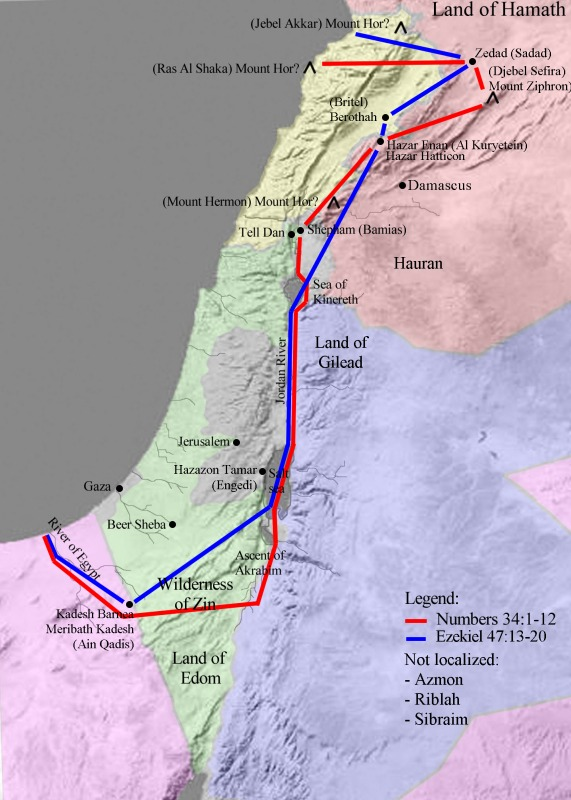
Map of the Land of Israel as defined in Numbers 34 and Ezekiel 47.

This section and the next chapter deal with the distribution of the land among the tribes of Israel, in a highly idealized scheme and with some place names that have not been identified with certainty.

=== Verse 13 ===
Thus says the Lord God:

“These are the borders by which you shall divide the land as an inheritance among the twelve tribes of Israel.
Joseph shall have two portions.”

- The vision of new Exodus and settlement received by Ezekiel is followed by the "new allotment of the land". The tribe of Levi (the priests) receives a land of its own (Ezekiel 45:1–8; Ezekiel 48:8–14), so the tribe of Joseph receive two portions to maintain a total of "twelve tribes".

== See also ==
- Berothah
- Damascus
- En Gedi
- En Eglaim
- Gilead
- Great Sea
- Hamath
- Hauran
- Hazar Enan
- Hazar Hatticon
- Hethlon
- Israel
- Jordan
- Kadesh
- Meribah
- Negev
- New Jerusalem Dead Sea Scroll
- Third Temple
- Tribe of Joseph
- Zedad
- Related Bible parts: Psalm 46, Ezekiel 40, Ezekiel 43, Ezekiel 44, Ezekiel 45

== Sources ==
- Bromiley, Geoffrey W. (1995). International Standard Bible Encyclopedia: vol. iv, Q-Z. Eerdmans. ISBN 9780802837844.
- Brown, Francis; Briggs, Charles A.; Driver, S. R. (1994). The Brown-Driver-Briggs Hebrew and English Lexicon (reprint ed.). Hendrickson Publishers. ISBN 978-1565632066.
- Carley, Keith W. (1974). The Book of the Prophet Ezekiel. Cambridge Bible Commentaries on the New English Bible (illustrated ed.). Cambridge University Press. ISBN 9780521097550.
- Clements, Ronald E (1996). Ezekiel. Westminster John Knox Press. ISBN 9780664252724.
- Coogan, Michael David (2007). Coogan, Michael David; Brettler, Marc Zvi; Newsom, Carol Ann; Perkins, Pheme (eds.). The New Oxford Annotated Bible with the Apocryphal/Deuterocanonical Books: New Revised Standard Version, Issue 48 (Augmented 3rd ed.). Oxford University Press. ISBN 9780195288810.
- Galambush, J. (2007). "25. Ezekiel". In Barton, John; Muddiman, John (eds.). The Oxford Bible Commentary (first (paperback) ed.). Oxford University Press. pp. 533–562. ISBN 978-0199277186.
- Gesenius, H. W. F. (1979). Gesenius' Hebrew and Chaldee Lexicon to the Old Testament Scriptures: Numerically Coded to Strong's Exhaustive Concordance, with an English Index. Translated by Tregelles, Samuel Prideaux (7th ed.). Baker Book House.
- Joyce, Paul M. (2009). Ezekiel: A Commentary. Continuum. ISBN 9780567483614.
- The Nelson Study Bible. Thomas Nelson, Inc. 1997. ISBN 9780840715999.
- Würthwein, Ernst (1995). The Text of the Old Testament. Translated by Rhodes, Erroll F. Grand Rapids, MI: Wm. B. Eerdmans. ISBN 0-8028-0788-7.
