= Ezekiel 46 =

Book of Ezekiel, chapter 46

- ← chapter 45 chapter 47 →
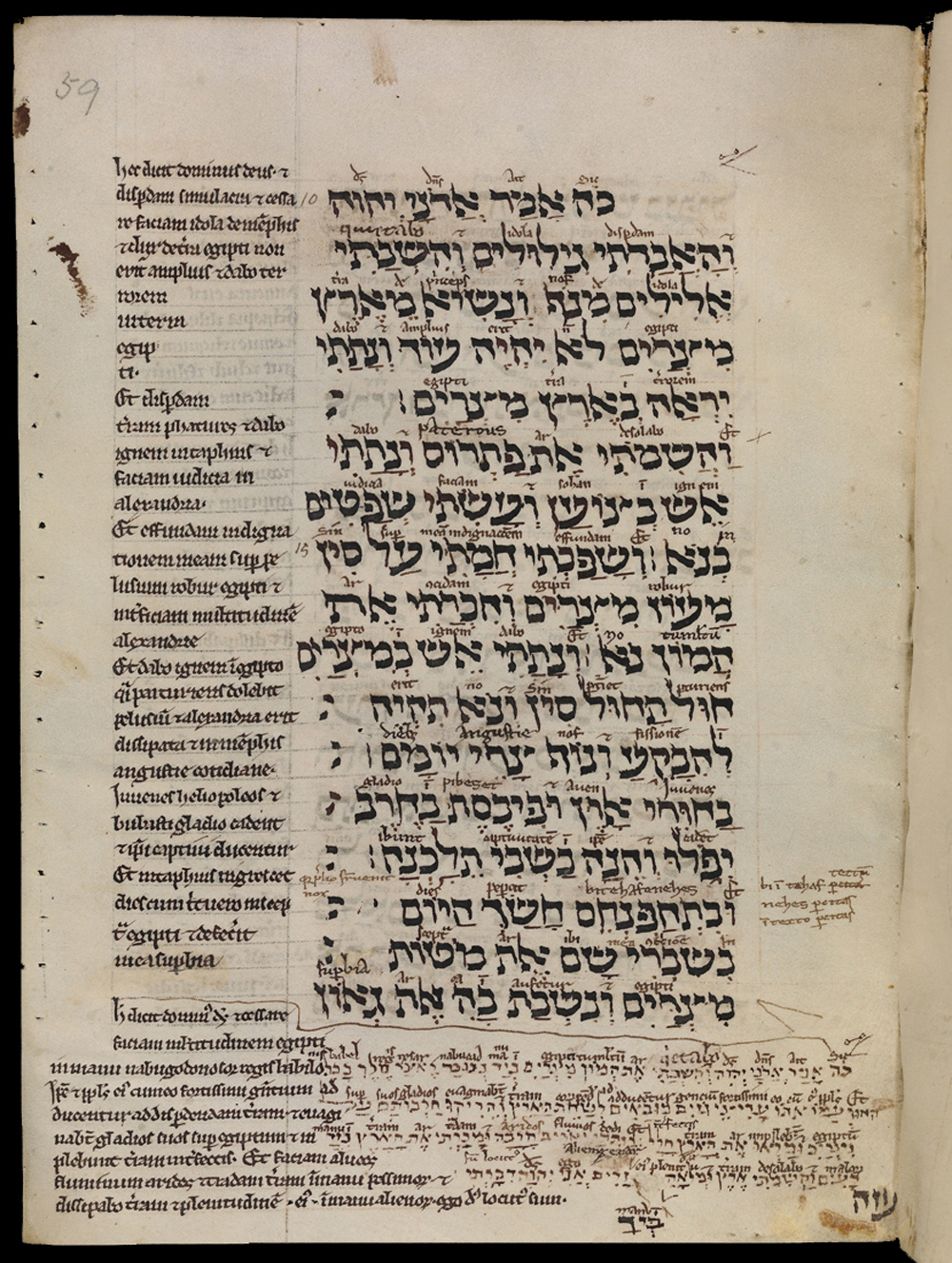
- Book of Ezekiel 30:13–18 in an English manuscript from the early 13th century, MS. Bodl. Or. 62, fol. 59a. A Latin translation appears in the margins with further interlineations above the Hebrew.
- Book: Book of Ezekiel
- Hebrew Bible part: Nevi'im
- Order in the Hebrew part: 7
- Category: Latter Prophets
- Christian Bible part: Old Testament
- Order in the Christian part: 26

Ezekiel 46 is the forty-sixth chapter of the Book of Ezekiel in the Hebrew Bible or the Old Testament of the Christian Bible. This book contains the prophecies attributed to the prophet/priest Ezekiel, and is one of the Books of the Prophets. The final section of Ezekiel, chapters 40-48, give the ideal picture of a new temple. The Jerusalem Bible refers to this section as "the Torah of Ezekiel". In particular, chapters 44–46 record various laws governing the rites and personnel of the sanctuary, as a supplement to Ezekiel's vision.

This chapter contains Ezekiel's vision of the ordinances for the prince in his worship (Ezekiel 46:1-8) and for the people (verses 9–15), an order for the prince's inheritance (verses 16–18) and the use of the courts for the boiling and baking of offerings (verses 19–24). The vision was given on the 25th anniversary of Ezekiel's exile, "April 28, 573 BCE"; 14 years after the fall of Jerusalem and 12 years after the last messages of hope in chapter 39.

== Text ==
The original text was written in the Hebrew language. This chapter is divided into 24 verses.

=== Textual witnesses ===
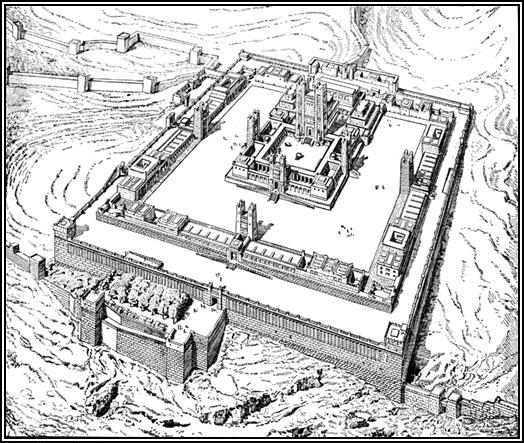
The visionary Ezekiel Temple plan drawn by the 19th-century French architect and Bible scholar Charles Chipiez

Some early manuscripts containing the text of this chapter in Hebrew are of the Masoretic Text tradition, which includes the Codex Cairensis (895), the Petersburg Codex of the Prophets (916), Aleppo Codex (10th century), Codex Leningradensis (1008). Fragments containing verses 1–3 of this chapter were identified among the Dead Sea Scrolls.

There is also a translation into Koine Greek known as the Septuagint, made in the last few centuries BC. Extant ancient manuscripts of the Septuagint version include Codex Vaticanus (B; $\mathfrak{G}$^{B}; 4th century), Codex Alexandrinus (A; $\mathfrak{G}$^{A}; 5th century) and Codex Marchalianus (Q; $\mathfrak{G}$^{Q}; 6th century). (Note: Ezekiel is missing from the extant Codex Sinaiticus.)

== Regulations for worship (46:1–15) ==
This section contains the continuation of the instruction for the prince's part in worship, together with the regulations for the people.

=== Verse 15 ===
" Thus they shall prepare the lamb, the grain offering, and the oil, as a regular burnt offering every morning."

- The prince is obliged to make daily offerings.

== Land laws for the prince (46:16–18) ==
The regulation in this section deals with the land transfers by the prince, presupposing the land distribution in Ezekiel 45:1–8 and Ezekiel 45:1–8.

== The temple kitchens (46:19–24) ==
This part serves as a supplement to Ezekiel 42:1–14, which specifies separate rooms for priests to eat their share of the sacrifice offerings (verse 13), and here a provision is made for a kitchen to prepare the food for the priests and for other kitchens for the Levites (the attendants in verse 24) to cook the worshipper's share of the offerings.

=== Verse 20 ===
And he said to me, "This is the place where the priests shall boil the trespass offering and the sin offering, and where they shall bake the grain offering, so that they do not bring them out into the outer court to sanctify the people."

=== Verse 24 ===
And he said to me, "These are the kitchens where the ministers of the temple shall boil the sacrifices of the people."

The kitchens described in verse 24 belong to the Levites and are different from those for the priests described in verses 19–20. This is to assure that the holy things will be properly separated and not to be 'contaminated by contact with the profane'.

== See also ==
- Levi
- New Jerusalem Dead Sea Scroll
- New Moon
- Sabbath
- Third Temple
- Related Bible parts: Ezekiel 40, Ezekiel 43, Ezekiel 44, Ezekiel 45, Ezekiel 47, Ezekiel 48, Revelation 21, Revelation 22

== Sources ==
- Bromiley, Geoffrey W. (1995). International Standard Bible Encyclopedia: vol. iv, Q-Z. Eerdmans. ISBN 9780802837844.
- Brown, Francis; Briggs, Charles A.; Driver, S. R. (1994). The Brown-Driver-Briggs Hebrew and English Lexicon (reprint ed.). Hendrickson Publishers. ISBN 978-1565632066.
- Carley, Keith W. (1974). The Book of the Prophet Ezekiel. Cambridge Bible Commentaries on the New English Bible (illustrated ed.). Cambridge University Press. ISBN 9780521097550.
- Clements, Ronald E (1996). Ezekiel. Westminster John Knox Press. ISBN 9780664252724.
- Coogan, Michael David (2007). Coogan, Michael David; Brettler, Marc Zvi; Newsom, Carol Ann; Perkins, Pheme (eds.). The New Oxford Annotated Bible with the Apocryphal/Deuterocanonical Books: New Revised Standard Version, Issue 48 (Augmented 3rd ed.). Oxford University Press. ISBN 9780195288810.
- Galambush, J. (2007). "25. Ezekiel". In Barton, John; Muddiman, John (eds.). The Oxford Bible Commentary (first (paperback) ed.). Oxford University Press. pp. 533–562. ISBN 978-0199277186.
- Gesenius, H. W. F. (1979). Gesenius' Hebrew and Chaldee Lexicon to the Old Testament Scriptures: Numerically Coded to Strong's Exhaustive Concordance, with an English Index. Translated by Tregelles, Samuel Prideaux (7th ed.). Baker Book House.
- Joyce, Paul M. (2009). Ezekiel: A Commentary. Continuum. ISBN 9780567483614.
- The Nelson Study Bible. Thomas Nelson, Inc. 1997. ISBN 9780840715999.
- Würthwein, Ernst (1995). The Text of the Old Testament. Translated by Rhodes, Erroll F. Grand Rapids, MI: Wm. B. Eerdmans. ISBN 0-8028-0788-7.
