= Ezekiel 38 =

Book of Ezekiel, chapter 38

- ← chapter 37 chapter 39 →
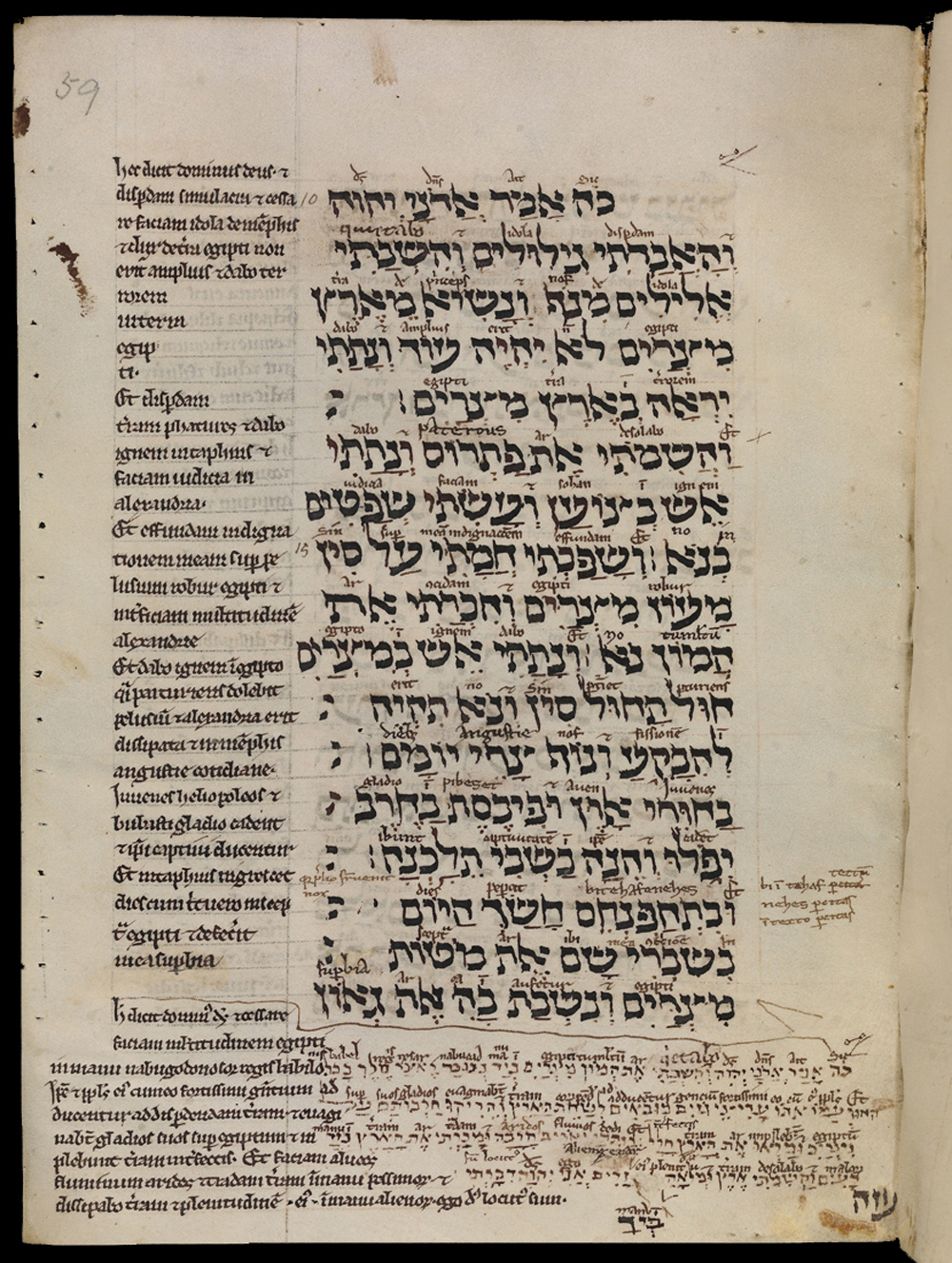
- Book of Ezekiel 30:13–18 in an English manuscript from early 13th century, MS. Bodl. Or. 62, fol. 59a. A Latin translation appears in the margins with further interlineations above the Hebrew.
- Book: Book of Ezekiel
- Hebrew Bible part: Nevi'im
- Order in the Hebrew part: 7
- Category: Latter Prophets
- Christian Bible part: Old Testament
- Order in the Christian part: 26

Ezekiel 38 is the thirty-eighth chapter of the Book of Ezekiel in the Hebrew Bible or the Old Testament of the Christian Bible. This book contains the prophecies attributed to the prophet/priest Ezekiel, and is one of the Books of the Prophets. This and the following chapter form a section dealing with "Gog, of the land of Magog".

== Text ==
Some early manuscripts containing the text of this chapter in Hebrew are of the Masoretic Text tradition, which includes the Codex Cairensis (dated to 895 CE), the Petersburg Codex of the Prophets (dated to 916 CE), Aleppo Codex (10th century), and Codex Leningradensis (dated to 1008 CE). Only one manuscript of several others of Ezekiel found among the Dead Sea Scrolls contained parts of this chapter, this being the Ezekiel Scroll from Masada (Mas 1d; MasEzek; 1–50 CE) with extant verses 38:1‑4, 7‑8.

There is also a translation into Koine Greek known as the Septuagint, made in the last few centuries BCE. Extant ancient manuscripts of the Septuagint version include Codex Vaticanus (B; $\mathfrak{G}$^{B}; 4th century), Codex Alexandrinus (A; $\mathfrak{G}$^{A}; 5th century) and Codex Marchalianus (Q; $\mathfrak{G}$^{Q}; 6th century). (Note: Ezekiel is missing from the extant Codex Sinaiticus.)

== War of Ezekiel 38–39 ==
The account of the War of Ezekiel 38–39 or the War of Gog and Magog in chapters 38 and 39 details how Gog of Magog, meaning "Gog from the Land of Magog" or "Gog from the Land of Gog" (the syllable ma being treated as equivalent to "land"), and his hordes from the north will threaten and attack the restored land of Israel. The chapters describe how God will make his presence known through an earthquake, and send torrential rains, hailstone, fire, and sulfur - subsequently destroying Gog and Magog. Following the defeat of Gog, God will establish a new Temple where he will dwell forever with his people (chapters 40–48). Theologian David Petersen refers to an underlying theological message, that even so fearsome an enemy as this is ultimately under the control of the God of Israel, since it is God himself who says to Gog, "I will bring you against my land".

== Verse 2 ==
"Son of man, set your face against Gog, of the land of Magog, the prince of Rosh, Meshech, and Tubal, and prophesy against him" (NKJV)

- "Son of man" (Hebrew: בן־אדם ḇen-’ā-ḏām): this phrase is used 93 times to address Ezekiel.
- "Rosh" (Hebrew: ראש rōsh: can also be translated as "head" (of human and animal); "top" (of the mountain); "beginning" (of time); "river-head"; "chief" (as in "chief-prince", "chief-priest", head of the family). In conjunction to the preceding word "prince", most English Bibles translates them as "chief prince."

== See also ==
- Dedan
- Egypt
- Ethiopia
- Gog
- Gomer
- Israel
- Libya
- Magog
- Meshech
- Persia
- Rosh
- Sheba
- Tarshish
- Togarmah
- Tubal
- Related Bible passages: Genesis 10, Psalm 83 (describes a similar war), Ezekiel 39, Revelation 20

== Bibliography ==
- Blenkinsopp, Joseph. "A history of prophecy in Israel" (Westminster John Knox Press, 1996)
- Bromiley, Geoffrey W. (1995). International Standard Bible Encyclopedia: vol. iv, Q-Z. Eerdmans. ISBN 9780802837844.
- Brown, Francis; Briggs, Charles A.; Driver, S. R. (1994). The Brown-Driver-Briggs Hebrew and English Lexicon (reprint ed.). Hendrickson Publishers. ISBN 978-1565632066.
- Bullock, C. Hassell. "An Introduction to the Old Testament Prophetic Books" (Moody Press, 1986)
- Gesenius, H. W. F. (1979). Gesenius' Hebrew and Chaldee Lexicon to the Old Testament Scriptures: Numerically Coded to Strong's Exhaustive Concordance, with an English Index. Translated by Tregelles, Samuel Prideaux (7th ed.). Baker Book House.
- Grabbe, Lester L., and Robert Hakke (eds), "'Every city shall be forsaken': urbanism and prophecy in ancient Israel and the Near East" (Sheffield Academic Press, 2001)
- Joyce, Paul M. (2009). Ezekiel: A Commentary. Continuum. ISBN 9780567483614.
- Redditt, Paul L. "Introduction to the Prophets" (Wm. B. Eerdmans Publishing, 2008)
