= Valley of Hamon-Gog =

Valley of Hamon-Gog, a phrase from Ezekiel 39:11,15, literally means "Valley of the multitudes of Gog". It is said to be the place where all of Israel buries the five-sixths of the army of Gog and Magog that are struck down by God.

== See also ==
- Baal Hammon
