= Daniel 2 =

Second chapter of the Book of Daniel

- ← chapter 1 chapter 3 →
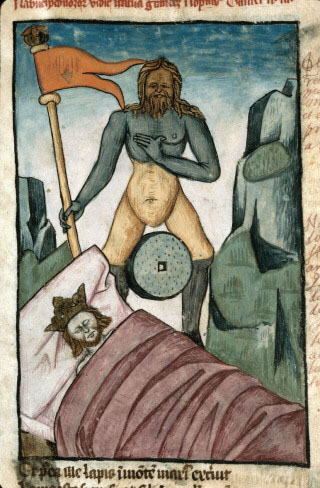
- Nebuchadnezzar's dream: the composite statue (France, 15th century)
- Book: Book of Daniel
- Category: Ketuvim
- Christian Bible part: Old Testament
- Order in the Christian part: 27

Daniel 2 (the second chapter of the Book of Daniel) tells how Daniel related and interpreted a dream of Nebuchadnezzar II, king of Babylon. In his night dream, the king saw a gigantic statue made of four metals, from its head of gold to its feet of mingled iron and clay; as he watched, a stone "not cut by human hands" destroyed the statue and became a mountain filling the whole world. Daniel explained to the king that the statue represented four successive kingdoms beginning with Babylon, while the stone and mountain signified a kingdom established by God which would never be destroyed nor given to another people. Nebuchadnezzar then acknowledges the supremacy of Daniel's God and raises him to high office in Babylon.

Chapter 2 in its present form dates from no earlier than the first decades of the Seleucid Empire (312–63 BCE), but its roots may reach back to the Fall of Babylon (539 BCE) and the rise of the Persian Achaemenid Empire (c. 550–330 BCE). The overall theme of the Book of Daniel is God's sovereignty over history. On the human level Daniel is set against the Babylonian magicians who fail to interpret the king's dream, but the cosmic conflict is between the God of Israel and the false Babylonian gods. What counts is not Daniel's human gifts, nor his education in the arts of divination, but "Divine Wisdom" and the power that belongs to God alone, as Daniel indicates when he urges his companions to seek God's mercy for the interpretation of the king's dreams.

== Biblical narrative ==
In the second year of his reign, Nebuchadnezzar, King of Babylon, is troubled by a dream. He summons his magicians and astrologers to interpret it, but demands that they first tell him what the dream was. They protest that no man can do such a thing, and Nebuchadnezzar orders that they all be executed. This decree also falls on Daniel, but he, through the agency of his God, is able to tell the king the dream. It was a dream of a great statue with a head of gold, arms and chest of silver, belly and thighs of bronze, legs of iron, and feet of mingled iron and clay. A great stone, not cut by human hands, fell on the feet of the statue and destroyed it, and the rock became a mountain that filled the whole world. Having related the dream, Daniel then interprets it: it concerns four successive kingdoms, beginning with Nebuchadnezzar, which will be replaced by the everlasting kingdom of the God of heaven. Hearing this, Nebuchadnezzar affirms that Daniel's god is "the God of gods and Lord of kings and revealer of mysteries". He lavishes gifts on Daniel and makes him chief of all the wise men and ruler over the province of Babylon.

== Composition and structure ==
=== Book of Daniel ===
It is generally accepted that the Book of Daniel originated as a collection of folktales among the Jewish community in Babylon and Mesopotamia in the Persian and early Hellenistic periods (5th to 3rd centuries BCE), expanded in the Maccabean era (mid-2nd century) by the visions in chapters 7–12. Modern scholars agree that Daniel is a legendary figure; it is possible that this name was chosen for the hero of the book because of his reputation as a wise seer in Hebrew tradition. The tales are in the voice of an anonymous narrator, except for chapter 4 which is in the form of a letter from king Nebuchadnezzar. The first three verses of chapter 2 and part of verse 4 are in Hebrew. The remainder of chapter 2 and chapters 3–7 are in Aramaic and are in the form of a chiasmus, a poetic structure in which the main point or message of a passage is placed in the centre and framed by further repetitions on either side:

- A. (2:4b-49) – A dream of four kingdoms replaced by a fifth
  - B. (3:1–30) – Daniel's three friends in the fiery furnace
    - C. (4:1–37) – Daniel interprets a dream for Nebuchadnezzar
    - C'. (5:1–31) – Daniel interprets the handwriting on the wall for Belshazzar
  - B'. (6:1–28) – Daniel in the lions' den
- A'. (7:1–28) – A vision of four world kingdoms replaced by a fifth

=== Daniel 2 ===
Daniel 2 forms a chiasmus within the larger structure of Daniel 2–7:

- A. Introduction (v.1)
  - B. The king and his unwise courtiers (vv.2–12)
    - C. Daniel and Arioch (vv.13–16)
      - D. Daniel and his friends pray to God (vv.17–23)
    - C'. Daniel and Arioch (vv.24–25)
  - B'. The king and Daniel, the wise courtier (vv.26–47)
- A'. Result (vv.48–49)

Chapter 1 and the first few lines of chapter 2 are in Hebrew, but in verse 4 the text says, in Hebrew, "Then the Chaldeans spoke to the king in Aramaic," and the book then continues in Aramaic until the end of chapter 7, where it switches back to Hebrew. No convincing explanation for this has been put forward.

Chapter 2 in its present form dates from no earlier than the first decades of the Seleucid Empire (late 4th/early 3rd centuries BCE), but its roots may reach back to the fall of Babylon and the rise of the Persian Achaemenid Empire, and some scholars have speculated that the dream of four kingdoms was originally a dream of four kings, Nebuchadnezzar and his four successors. The lack of linguistic continuity (the switch from Hebrew to Aramaic at verse 4), and of continuity with other parts of Daniel (e.g., the king needs an introduction to Daniel despite having interviewed him at the completion of his training in Daniel 1:18), as well as various instances of repetitiveness (see verses 28–30), are sometimes cited as evidence that later hands have edited the story, or as signs that the author was working from multiple sources.

== Genre and themes ==
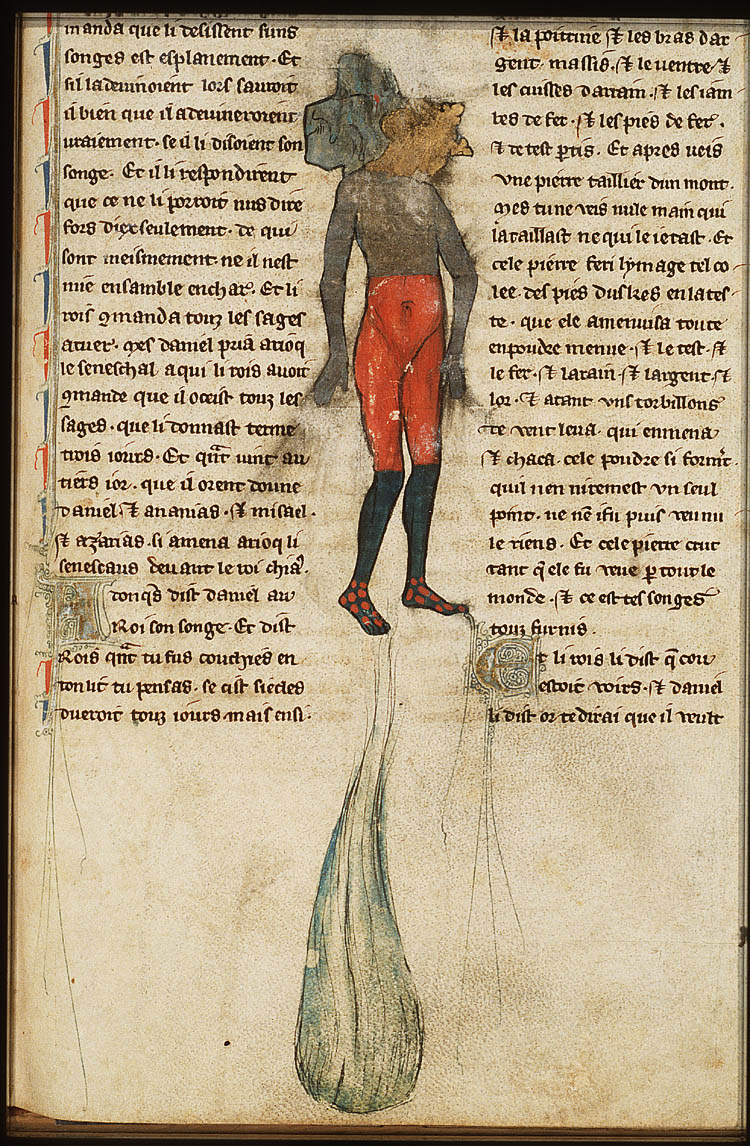
Illustration of Nebuchadnezzar's statue from the 13th-century Chroniques de la Bible (The Hague, Royal Library of the Netherlands, 131 A 3, fol. 25)

=== Genre ===
The Book of Daniel is an apocalypse, a literary genre in which a heavenly reality is revealed to a human recipient; such works are characterized by visions, symbolism, an other-worldly mediator, an emphasis on cosmic events, angels and demons, and pseudonymity (false authorship). Apocalypses were common from 300 BCE to 100 CE, not only among Jews and Christians, but Greeks, Romans, Persians and Egyptians. Daniel, the book's hero, is a representative apocalyptic seer, the recipient of the divine revelation: has learned the wisdom of the Babylonian magicians and surpassed them, because his God is the true source of knowledge; he is one of the maskil, the wise, whose task is to teach righteousness. The book is also an eschatology, meaning a divine revelation concerning the end of the present age, a moment in which God will intervene in history to usher in the final kingdom.

Daniel 2 exhibits both these genres, but it is also made up numerous subgenres: a court tale, a dream report, a legend, an aretalogy, a doxology, and a midrash. In folkloric terms it can be typified as a "court legend," a story set in the royal court, concerned with wonderful events and containing an edifying message. The plot of such tales (another example is the story of Joseph and Pharaoh in Genesis 41) is as follows: a person of low status is called before a person of high status to answer a difficult question or to solve a riddle; the high-status person poses the problem but none present can solve; the person of low status solves it and is rewarded.

=== Themes ===
The overall theme of the Book of Daniel is God's sovereignty over history, and the theme of the tales in chapters 1–6 is that God is sovereign over all earthly kings. In Daniel 2 these two merge, and the claim of God's sovereignty extends beyond the immediate story to take in all of history. On the human level Daniel is set against the Babylonian magicians who fail to interpret the king's dream, but the cosmic conflict is between the God of Israel and the false Babylonian gods. What counts is not Daniel's human gifts, nor his education in the arts of divination, but "Divine Wisdom" and the power that belongs to God alone, as Daniel indicates when he urges his companions to seek God's mercy for the interpretation of the king's dreams.

== Interpretation ==
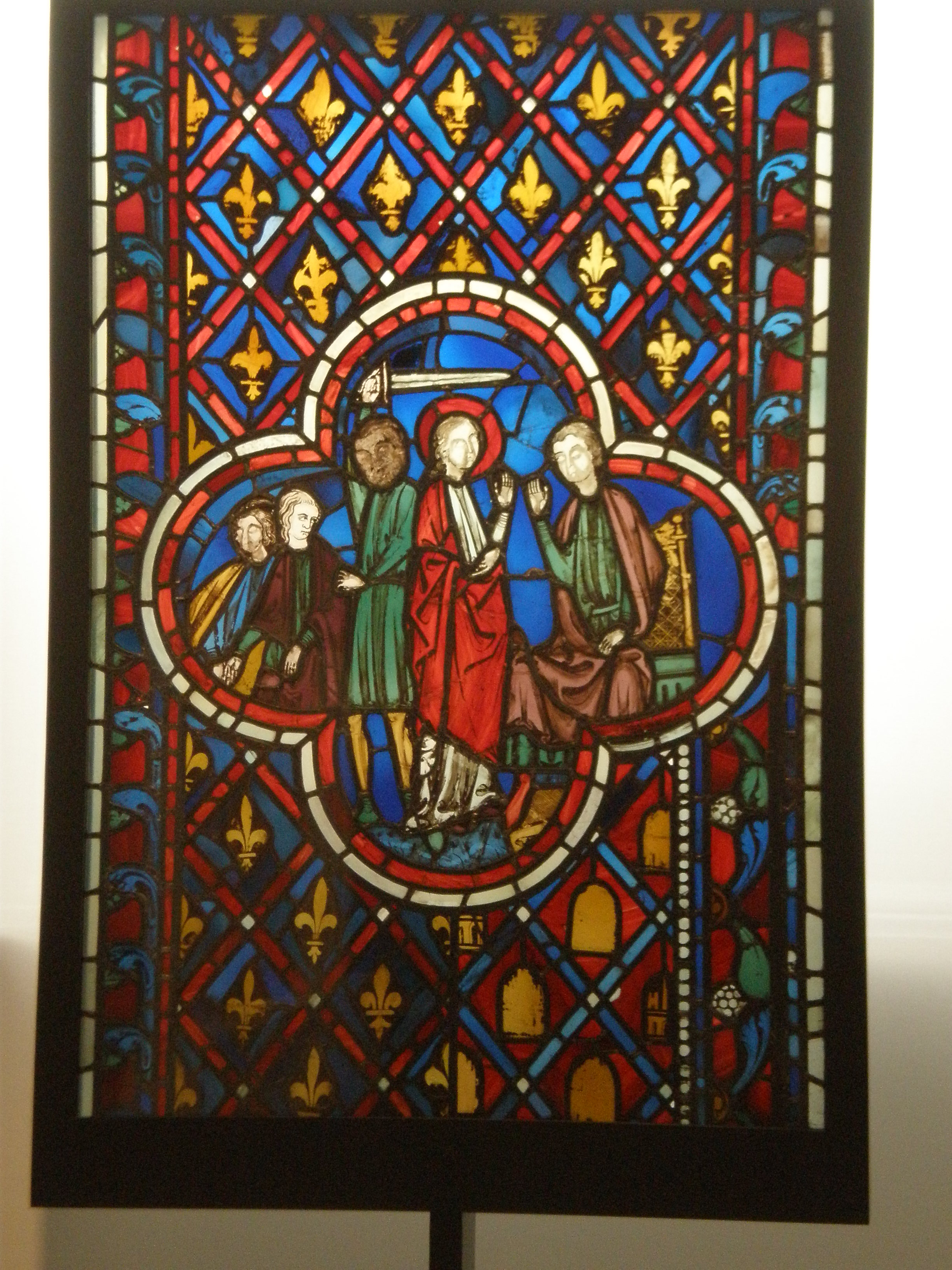
Daniel intercedes with Arioch.

=== Overview: dreams in the ancient world ===
In the ancient world, dreams, especially those of kings, were regarded as portents. An inscription of the historic Babylonian king Nabonidus, for example, tells of a dream he had of his great predecessor Nebuchadnezzar, mentioning a young man who appeared in the dream to reassure him that it was not an evil portent. Giant figures were frequent in ancient dream records, and parallels can be drawn from Greek (Hesiod's Works and Days), Latin (Ovid's Metamorphosis) and the Persian Bahman Yasht.

The king's behaviour implies a distrust of his court dream-interpreters, and sets the scene for his later celebration of Daniel's God. The secret of Nebuchadnezzar's dream is called a "mystery," a term found in the scrolls from Qumran indicating a secret that can be learned through divine wisdom; appropriately, Daniel receives the divine wisdom as a "vision of the night", a dream. Daniel 2:20–23 emphasizes the Divine as a repository of wisdom and the controller of the destiny of kings; such hymns and prayers are typical of postexilic biblical narratives. Finally Nebuchadnezzar prostrates himself before Daniel and commands that offerings and incense be offered to him, suggesting that he views Daniel as divine; nevertheless, although he acknowledges and respects the god of Daniel, he is not a convert.

=== The four world kingdoms and the rock ===
Most modern scholars agree that the four world empires symbolised by the statue are Babylon (the head), the Medes (arms and shoulders), Persia (thighs and legs) and Seleucid Syria and Ptolemaic Egypt (the feet). The concept of four successive world empires is drawn from Greek theories of mythological history, while the symbolism of the four metals is drawn from Persian writings. The consensus among scholars is that the four beasts of chapter 7 symbolise the same four world empires. Verses 41b-43 give three different interpretations of the meaning of the mixture of iron and clay in the statue's feet, as a "divided kingdom," then as "strong and brittle," and finally as a dynastic marriage. The marriage might be a reference to either of two between the Seleucids and the Ptolemies, the first in c.250 BCE and the second in 193.

The symbolic significance of the stone which destroys the statue and becomes a mountain evokes biblical imagery of God as the "rock" of Israel, Zion as a mountain rising above all others, and God's glory filling the whole world. Images from the Book of Isaiah seem to be especially favoured. Whether the author was conscious of it or not, the image of the shattered statue blown away in the wind like chaff from the threshing floor brings to mind Isaiah 41:14–15 where Israel is a threshing sled that turns mountains into chaff, and the rock itself reflects the address to the Judean exiles in Isaiah 51:1, "look to the rock from which you were hewn."

== Christian eschatological readings ==
The traditional interpretation of the dream identifies the four empires as the Babylonian (the head), Medo-Persian (arms and shoulders), Greek (thighs and legs), and Roman (the feet) empires.

== See also ==
Jewish dream interpretation
