= God is our refuge =

- Motet by W. A. Mozart
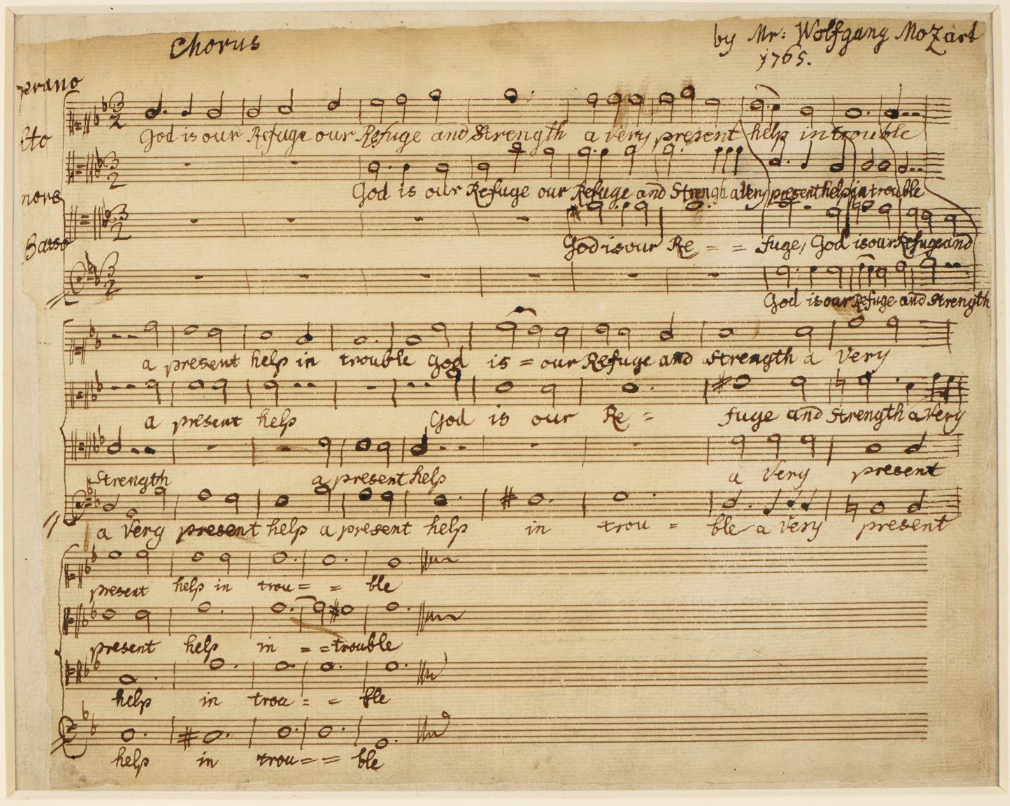
- Manuscript in the British Library
- Catalogue: K. 20
- Text: Psalm 46
- Language: English
- Composed: 1765: London
- Scoring: four voices SATB

God is our refuge, K. 20, is a motet for four voices in G minor composed in July 1765 by Wolfgang Amadeus Mozart when he was 9 years old. Based on Psalm 46, Mozart wrote it in London on the Mozart family grand tour as a gift for the British Museum along with one other supposed work: a set of variations in A major, K. 21a.

Sir: I am ordered by the Standing Committee of the Trustees of the British Museum, to signify to You, that they have received the present of the musical performances of your very ingenious Son which you were pleased lately to make them, and to return You their Thanks for the same."

— A brief note from a secretary at the British Museum,

== Score ==
The 23-bar work is scored for four voices: soprano, alto, tenor and bass, and is written in 3/2 time.

=== Lyrics ===
God is our refuge,
our refuge and strength,
a very present help in trouble,
a present help in trouble.

== Influence ==
As the manuscript for this work is still intact, one can find two separate, distinct handwritings: Wolfgang's, and his father's Leopold. It can be seen that Wolfgang most likely wrote the tempo markings, key signatures and clefs, as well as all of the notes. Leopold was suspected to have a hand in the written words after bar seven, as the young Wolfgang seemingly had trouble judging the amount of space necessary to fit in the written text (as can be seen by the wave pattern of the bar lines near measure 7).

The work was possibly based on a given melody at the time of composition; perhaps stemming from a composition written in 1765 of similar character by Jonathan Battishill. God is our refuge shows many stylistic similarities to that of 16th century English church music, which Mozart was undoubtedly exposed to whilst traveling London at the time.
