= Hethlon =

Hethlon was a biblical city on the boundary of Palestine. It has two references in the Bible, both of which are in the Book of Ezekiel. It is described as a fearful dwelling. It has been identified as modern Heitela in Syria, although theologian Tremper Longman claimed recently that its exact location is still unknown.

== See also ==
- Ezekiel 47
- Ezekiel 48
- Land of Israel
