= Psalm 46 =

Biblical psalm

- "God is our refuge and strength, a very present help in trouble"
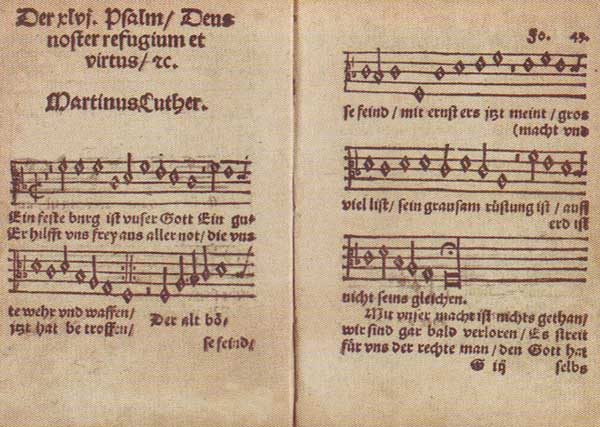
- Print of Luther's paraphrase of Psalm 46 in Klug's Gesangbuch, 1533: Der xlvi. Psalm / Deus noster refugium et virtus
- Other name: Psalm 46; "Deus noster refugium et virtus"
- Language: Hebrew (original)

Psalm 46
- ← Psalm 45 Psalm 47 →
- Book: Book of Psalms
- Hebrew Bible part: Ketuvim
- Order in the Hebrew part: 1
- Category: Sifrei Emet
- Christian Bible part: Old Testament
- Order in the Christian part: 19

Psalm 46 is the 46th psalm of the Book of Psalms, beginning in English in the King James Version: "God is our refuge and strength, a very present help in trouble". In the slightly different numbering system used in the Greek Septuagint and Latin Vulgate translations of the Bible, this psalm is Psalm 45. In Latin, it is known as "Deus noster refugium et virtus". The song is attributed to the sons of Korah.

The psalm forms a regular part of Jewish, Catholic, Lutheran, Anglican and other Protestant liturgies. According to Charles Spurgeon, Psalm 46 is called a "song of holy confidence"; it is also known as "Luther's Psalm", as Martin Luther wrote his popular hymn "Ein feste Burg ist unser Gott" ("A Mighty Fortress Is Our God") using Psalm 46 as a starting point. Luther's hymn has been quoted in many musical works, both religious and secular, including Bach's cantata Ein feste Burg ist unser Gott, BWV 80. Johann Pachelbel composed the psalm in German, while Marc-Antoine Charpentier and Jean Philippe Rameau, among numerous other composers, chose to set it in Latin.

== Structure ==
The text is divided into three sections, each ending with a Selah, after verses 4, 8 and 12 according to the Hebrew verse numbering.

== Themes ==
According to Matthew Henry, this psalm may have been composed after David defeated the enemies of ancient Israel from surrounding lands. Spurgeon notes that the description in verse 1 in the Hebrew Bible version, calling for the psalm to be played "on alamot", could denote either a high-pitched musical instrument or the soprano voices of young girls who went out to dance in celebration of David's victory over the Philistines. The Jerusalem Bible renders this word as an oboe. The Midrash Tehillim, however, parses the word alamot (Hebrew: עלמות) as referring to the "hidden things" that God does for his people. The psalm praises God for being a source of power and salvation in times of trouble.

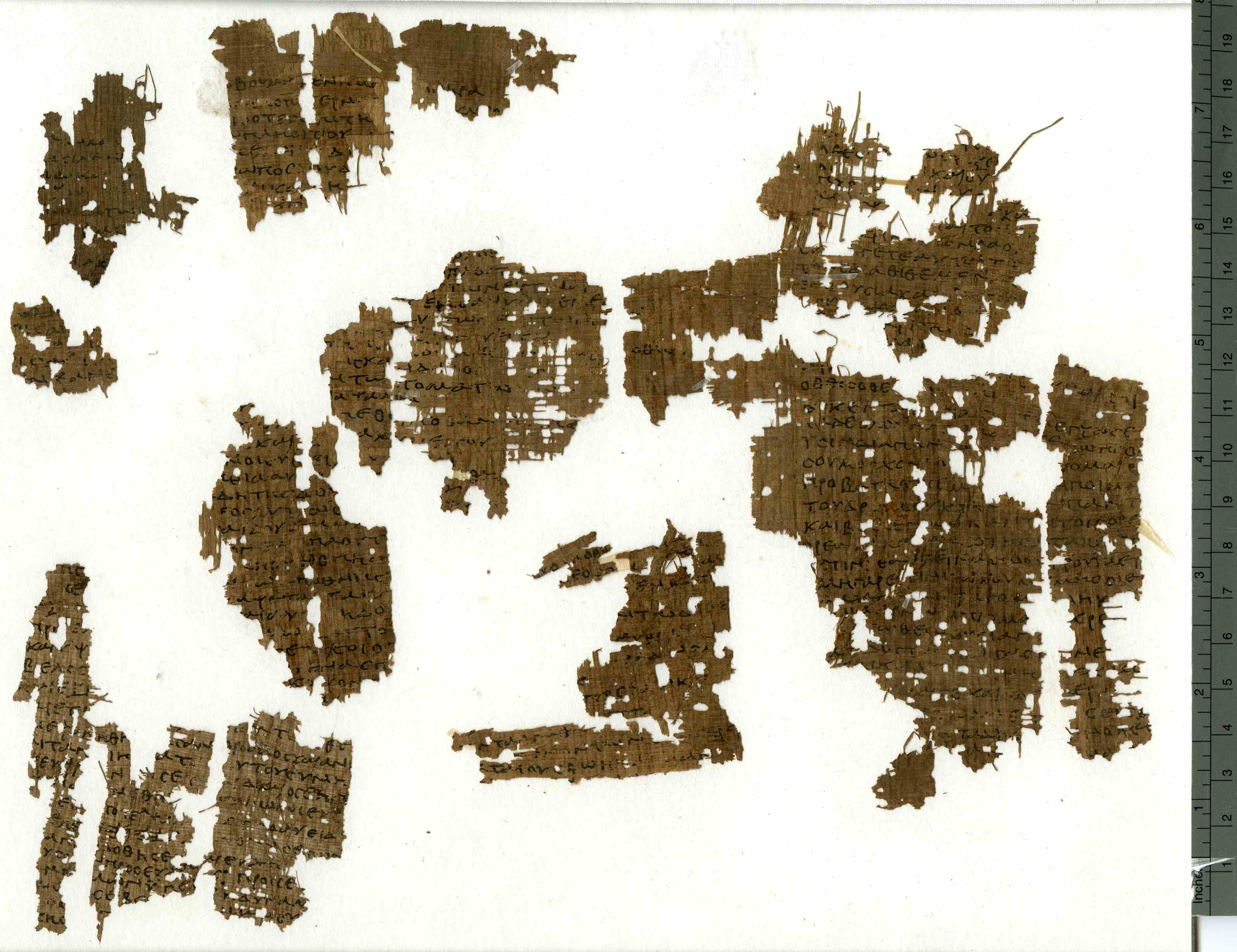
Papyrus Oxyrhynchus 5101, oldest copy of Psalm 46.

There is a difference of opinion among Christian scholars as to which "river" the psalm is referring to in verse 4 of the KJV, the streams of which make glad the city of God. Among the possibilities are:

- The Jordan River. However, the Jordan River is a distance of 20 miles (32 km) northeast of Jerusalem (assuming that the "city of God" is a reference to Jerusalem). For this reason, some have found this possibility unlikely.
- A river in Jerusalem during the millennial reign of Christ. This river will run from beneath the Temple in Jerusalem eastward to the Dead Sea, as described in the forty-seventh chapter of the Book of Ezekiel.
- A river in Jerusalem after the millennial reign of Christ. This is the river that flows from the New Jerusalem, as described in the twenty-second chapter of the New Testament Book of Revelation.

It has been proposed that this psalm is prophesying the kingdom of God under Jesus Christ, which He inaugurated at His first coming and will conclude when He returns.

== Uses ==
=== Judaism ===
Portions of the psalm are used or referenced in several Jewish prayers. Verse 2 in the Hebrew is part of Selichot. Verse 8 is said in the daily morning service during the recitation of the incense offering, in Pesukei Dezimra, and in Uva Letzion; it is said in Uva Letzion in the Shabbat morning service, Yom Tov afternoon service, and Motza'ei Shabbat evening service as well. Verse 12 is part of the Havdalah ceremony. Yemenite Jews include it as part of Yehi kevod.

In the Siddur Avodas Yisroel, Psalm 46 is the psalm of the day for Shabbat Va'eira.

=== Catholic Church ===
This psalm was traditionally recited or sung at the office of matins on Tuesday after St. Benedict of Nursia established his rule of St. Benedict around 530, mainly in the numerical order of the psalms. Today, Psalm 46 is sung or recited at vespers on Friday of the first week of the liturgical four weekly cycle.

=== Coptic Orthodox Church ===
In the Agpeya, the Coptic Church's book of hours, this psalm is prayed in the office of Terce.

=== Book of Common Prayer ===
In the Church of England's Book of Common Prayer, this psalm is appointed to be read on the morning of the ninth day of the month.

=== Politics ===
U.S. President Barack Obama referenced the psalm in several speeches, most notably his Tucson memorial speech and his speech on the 10th anniversary of the September 11 attacks in New York City.

== Musical settings ==
Martin Luther wrote and composed a hymn which paraphrases Psalm 46, "Ein feste Burg ist unser Gott", which was translated as "A Mighty Fortress Is Our God". Luther's hymn was called "the Marseillaise of the Reformation" by Heinrich Heine in his essay Zur Geschichte der Religion und Philosophie in Deutschland. It inspired many musical works, both religious and secular. Johann Sebastian Bach based one of his chorale cantatas, Ein feste Burg ist unser Gott, BWV 80, on Luther's hymn.

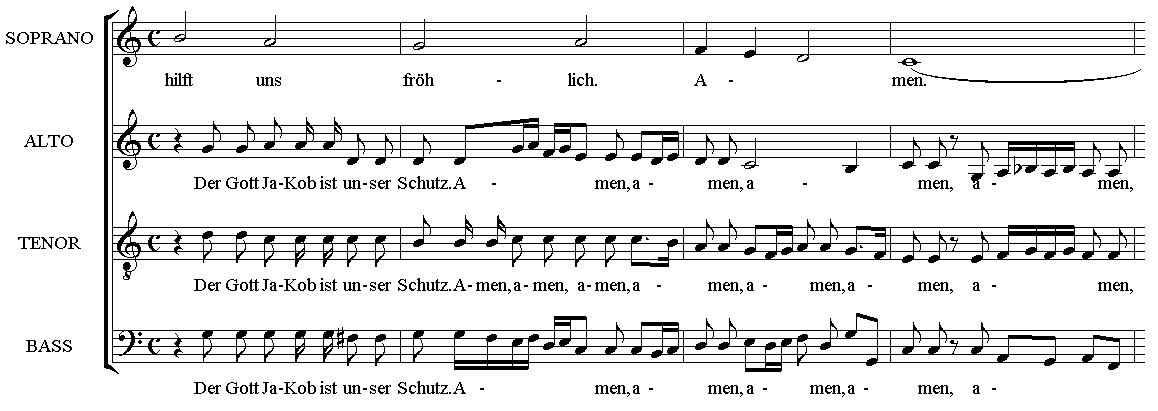
From Pachelbel's motet

In the 17th century, Johann Pachelbel composed a motet setting of Psalm 46, Gott ist unser Zuversicht und Stärke. Heinrich Schütz wrote a setting of a paraphrase in German, "Ein feste Burg ist unser Gott", SWV 143, for the Becker Psalter, published first in 1628. In 1699, Michel-Richard Delalande based a grand motet on the psalm. Marc-Antoine Charpentier set in early 1690s a "Deus noster refugium" H.218, for soloists, chorus, 2 treble instruments and continuo. Jean Philippe Rameau set the psalm for the motet Deus noster refugium.

In July 1765, the 9-year old Mozart wrote a short motet to the text of the first verse as a gift to the British Museum and an homage to 16th century English composers such as Thomas Tallis.

In contemporary music, the Christian duo Shane & Shane adapted the psalm into the song "Psalm 46 (Lord of Hosts)", which appeared on their 2016 album Psalms II.

== Text ==
The following table shows the Hebrew text of the Psalm with vowels, alongside the Koine Greek text in the Septuagint and the English translation from the King James Version. Note that the meaning can slightly differ between these versions, as the Septuagint and the Masoretic Text come from different textual traditions. (Note: A 1917 translation directly from Hebrew to English by the Jewish Publication Society can be found here or here, and an 1844 translation directly from the Septuagint by L. C. L. Brenton can be found here. Both translations are in the public domain.) In the Septuagint, this psalm is numbered Psalm 45.

#	Hebrew	English	Greek
(Note: In the Jewish verse numbering, the ascription of this psalm is verse 1, and the rest of the psalm begins from verse 2. However, the Christian verse numbering does not count the ascription as a separate verse.)	לַמְנַצֵּ֥חַ לִבְנֵי־קֹ֑רַח עַֽל־עֲלָמ֥וֹת שִֽׁיר׃	(To the chief Musician for the sons of Korah, A Song upon Alamoth. (Note: The New Living Translation, however, says, "To be sung by soprano voices."))	Εἰς τὸ τέλος· ὑπὲρ τῶν υἱῶν Κορέ, ὑπὲρ τῶν κρυφίων ψαλμός. -
1	אֱלֹהִ֣ים לָ֭נוּ מַחֲסֶ֣ה וָעֹ֑ז עֶזְרָ֥ה בְ֝צָר֗וֹת נִמְצָ֥א מְאֹֽד׃	God is our refuge and strength, a very present help in trouble.	Ο ΘΕΟΣ ἡμῶν καταφυγὴ καὶ δύναμις, βοηθὸς ἐν θλίψεσι ταῖς εὑρούσαις ἡμᾶς σφόδρα.
2	עַל־כֵּ֣ן לֹֽא־נִ֭ירָא בְּהָמִ֣יר אָ֑רֶץ וּבְמ֥וֹט הָ֝רִ֗ים בְּלֵ֣ב יַמִּֽים׃	Therefore will not we fear, though the earth be removed, and though the mountains be carried into the midst of the sea;	διὰ τοῦτο οὐ φοβηθησόμεθα ἐν τῷ ταράσσεσθαι τὴν γῆν καὶ μετατίθεσθαι ὄρη ἐν καρδίαις θαλασσῶν.
3	יֶהֱמ֣וּ יֶחְמְר֣וּ מֵימָ֑יו יִ֥רְעֲשֽׁוּ הָרִ֖ים בְּגַאֲוָת֣וֹ סֶֽלָה׃	Though the waters thereof roar and be troubled, though the mountains shake with the swelling thereof. Selah. (Note: The New Living Translation, however, tells God in this verse, "Let the oceans roar and foam! Let the mountains tremble as the waters surge!")	ἤχησαν καὶ ἐταράχθησαν τὰ ὕδατα αὐτῶν, ἐταράχθησαν τὰ ὄρη ἐν τῇ κραταιότητι αὐτοῦ. (διάψαλμα).
4	נָהָ֗ר פְּלָגָ֗יו יְשַׂמְּח֥וּ עִיר־אֱלֹהִ֑ים קְ֝דֹ֗שׁ מִשְׁכְּנֵ֥י עֶלְיֽוֹן׃	There is a river, the streams whereof shall make glad the city of God, the holy place of the tabernacles of the most High.	τοῦ ποταμοῦ τὰ ὁρμήματα εὐφραίνουσι τὴν πόλιν τοῦ Θεοῦ· ἡγίασε τὸ σκήνωμα αὐτοῦ ὁ ῞Υψιστος.
5	אֱלֹהִ֣ים בְּ֭קִרְבָּהּ בַּל־תִּמּ֑וֹט יַעְזְרֶ֥הָ אֱ֝לֹהִ֗ים לִפְנ֥וֹת בֹּֽקֶר׃	God is in the midst of her; she shall not be moved: God shall help her, and that right early.	ὁ Θεὸς ἐν μέσῳ αὐτῆς καὶ οὐ σαλευθήσεται· βοηθήσει αὐτῇ ὁ Θεὸς τὸ πρὸς πρωΐ πρωΐ.
6	הָמ֣וּ ג֭וֹיִם מָ֣טוּ מַמְלָכ֑וֹת נָתַ֥ן בְּ֝קוֹל֗וֹ תָּמ֥וּג אָֽרֶץ׃	The heathen raged, the kingdoms were moved: he uttered his voice, the earth melted.	ἐταράχθησαν ἔθνη, ἔκλιναν βασιλεῖαι· ἔδωκε φωνὴν αὐτοῦ, ἐσαλεύθη ἡ γῆ.
7	יְהֹוָ֣ה צְבָא֣וֹת עִמָּ֑נוּ מִשְׂגָּֽב־לָ֨נוּ אֱלֹהֵ֖י יַֽעֲקֹ֣ב סֶֽלָה׃	The LORD of hosts is with us; the God of Jacob is our refuge. Selah.	Κύριος τῶν δυνάμεων μεθ᾿ ἡμῶν, ἀντιλήπτωρ ἡμῶν ὁ Θεὸς ᾿Ιακώβ. (διάψαλμα).
8	לְֽכוּ־חֲ֭זוּ מִפְעֲל֣וֹת יְהֹוָ֑ה אֲשֶׁר־שָׂ֖ם שַׁמּ֣וֹת בָּאָֽרֶץ׃	Come, behold the works of the LORD, what desolations he hath made in the earth.	δεῦτε καὶ ἴδετε τὰ ἔργα τοῦ Θεοῦ, ἃ ἔθετο τέρατα ἐπὶ τῆς γῆς.
9	מַשְׁבִּ֥ית מִלְחָמוֹת֮ עַד־קְצֵ֢ה הָ֫אָ֥רֶץ קֶ֣שֶׁת יְ֭שַׁבֵּר וְקִצֵּ֣ץ חֲנִ֑ית עֲ֝גָל֗וֹת יִשְׂרֹ֥ף בָּאֵֽשׁ׃	He maketh wars to cease unto the end of the earth; he breaketh the bow, and cutteth the spear in sunder; he burneth the chariot in the fire.	ἀνταναιρῶν πολέμους μέχρι τῶν περάτων τῆς γῆς τόξον συντρίψει καὶ συνθλάσει ὅπλον καὶ θυρεοὺς κατακαύσει ἐν πυρί.
10	הַרְפּ֣וּ וּ֭דְעוּ כִּֽי־אָנֹכִ֣י אֱלֹהִ֑ים אָר֥וּם בַּ֝גּוֹיִ֗ם אָר֥וּם בָּאָֽרֶץ׃	Be still, and know that I am God: I will be exalted among the heathen, I will be exalted in the earth.	σχολάσατε καὶ γνῶτε ὅτι ἐγώ εἰμι ὁ Θεός· ὑψωθήσομαι ἐν τοῖς ἔθνεσιν, ὑψωθήσομαι ἐν τῇ γῇ.
11	יְהֹוָ֣ה צְבָא֣וֹת עִמָּ֑נוּ מִשְׂגָּֽב־לָ֨נוּ אֱלֹהֵ֖י יַעֲקֹ֣ב סֶֽלָה׃	The LORD of hosts is with us; the God of Jacob is our refuge. Selah.	Κύριος τῶν δυνάμεων μεθ᾿ ἡμῶν, ἀντιλήπτωρ ἡμῶν ὁ Θεὸς ᾿Ιακώβ.

=== Verse 5 ===
The reference to "morning" or the "break of day" in verse 5 alludes to Abraham, who would rise at daybreak to pray to God.

=== Verse 10 ===
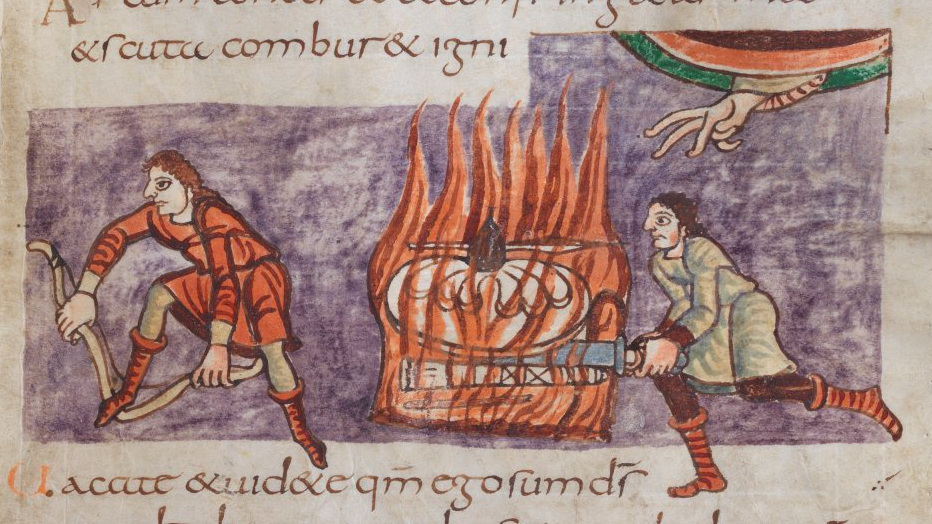
Illustration of verse 9 from the Stuttgart Psalter

Be still, and know that I am God;
I will be exalted among the nations,
I will be exalted in the earth!

This verse is further developed in Psalm 47, which opens with the words "Oh, clap your hands, all you peoples! Shout to God with the voice of triumph! It is all the nations of the world who are addressed.

== Shakespeare's alleged involvement ==
For several decades, some theorists have suggested that William Shakespeare placed his mark on the translated text of Psalm 46 that appears in the King James Bible, although many scholars view this as unlikely, stating that the translations were probably agreed upon by a committee of scholars.

== In popular culture ==
In the 1964 film, Zulu, actor Nigel Green playing Colour Sergeant Frank Bourne, recites part of Psalm 46 to a Swedish missionary.

== Notes and references ==
=== Sources ===
- Idelsohn, Abraham Zebi (1932). Jewish Liturgy and its Development. H. Holt & Co.
