= Daniel 1 =

First chapter of the Book of Daniel

- ← Ezekiel 48 chapter 2 →
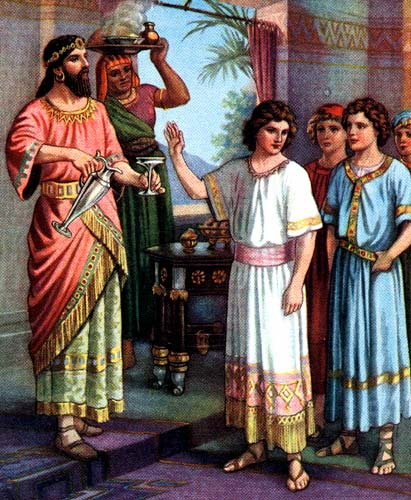
- Daniel refusing to eat at the King's table, early 1900s Bible illustration
- Book: Book of Daniel
- Category: Ketuvim
- Christian Bible part: Old Testament
- Order in the Christian part: 27

Daniel 1 (the first chapter of the Book of Daniel) tells how Daniel and his three companions were among captives taken by Nebuchadnezzar II from Jerusalem to Babylon to be trained in Babylonian wisdom. There they refused to take food and wine from the king and were given knowledge and insight into dreams and visions by God, and at the end of their training they proved ten times better than all the magicians and enchanters in the kingdom.

The overall theme of Daniel is God's sovereignty over history. Chapter 1 introduces God as the figure in control of all that happens, the possessor of sovereign will and power: it is he who gives Jehoiakim into Nebuchadnezzar's hands and takes Daniel and his friends into Babylonian exile, he gives Daniel "grace and mercies," and gives the four young Jews their "knowledge and skill."

The Book of Daniel is "a composite text of dubious historicity from various genres", and Daniel himself is a legendary figure. The book of which he is the hero divides into two parts, a set of tales in chapters 1–6 from no earlier than the Hellenistic period (323–30 BCE), and the series of visions in chapters 7–12 from the Maccabean era (the mid-2nd century BCE). Chapter 1 was apparently added as an introduction to the tales when they were collected around the end of the 3rd century BCE.

== Summary ==
In the third year of king Jehoiakim of Judah, God let the kingdom fall "into the hand" (Daniel 1:1) or under the influence of Nebuchadnezzar II, king of Babylon, who carried off some of the Temple vessels to Babylon. Some young Jews of royal and noble blood, already educated (Daniel 1:4), to be taught the literature and language of Babylon for three years, at the end of which they would be placed in the royal court. Among these young men were Daniel, Hananiah, Mishael and Azariah, who were given new names (Hananiah, Mishael and Azariah became Shadrach, Meshach and Abednego, while Daniel's Babylonian name was Belteshazzar) and allocated rations of food and wine. But Daniel resolved not to defile himself, and refused the royal food and wine, thriving instead on vegetables and water. God gave them knowledge and skill, and to Daniel he gave insight into visions and dreams, and when the three years of training were completed none were found to compare with them in wisdom and understanding.

== Composition and structure ==
The Book of Daniel originated as a collection of tales among the Jewish community in Babylon and Mesopotamia in the Persian and early Hellenistic periods (5th to 3rd centuries BCE), before being expanded in the Maccabean era (mid-2nd century) by the addition of the visions in chapters 7–12. Daniel is a legendary figure, probably chosen for the book's hero because of his reputation as a wise seer in Hebrew tradition. The tales are in the voice of an anonymous narrator, except for chapter 4, which is in the form of a letter from king Nebuchadnezzar. Chapters 2–7 are in the form of a chiasmus, a poetic structure in which the main point or message of a passage is placed in the centre and framed by further repetitions on either side:

- A. (2:4b-49) – A dream of four kingdoms replaced by a fifth
  - B. (3:1–30) – Daniel's three friends in the fiery furnace
    - C. (4:1–37) – Daniel interprets a dream for Nebuchadnezzar
    - C'. (5:1–31) – Daniel interprets the handwriting on the wall for Belshazzar
  - B'. (6:1–28) – Daniel in the lions' den
- A'. (7:1–28) – A vision of four world kingdoms replaced by a fifth

Daniel 1 serves as an introduction to the book, showing how God continues to move throughout history when men seem to have failed (i.e., how God stands for his people when they are in a foreign land and subject to an alien power). An interesting feature of the book is that the accounts of chapters 2–6 and the visions in chapter 7 are in Aramaic (after the first few lines of chapter 2 in Hebrew). However, the visions of chapters 8–12 are in Hebrew, as is the introduction, chapter 1.

== Genre and themes ==
=== Genre ===
The Book of Daniel is an apocalypse, a literary genre in which a heavenly reality is revealed to a human recipient; such works are characterized by visions, symbolism, an angelic interpreter, and an emphasis on end-time events. Apocalypses were common from 300 BCE to 100 CE, not only among Jews and Christians, but Greeks, Romans, Persians and Egyptians. Daniel, the book's hero, is a representative apocalyptic seer, the recipient of the divine revelation. He refused to learn the wisdom of the Babylonian magicians and thus surpassed them, because his God is the true source of knowledge. The book is also an eschatology, meaning a divine revelation concerning the end of the present age, a moment in which God will intervene in history to usher in the final kingdom.

=== Themes ===
The overall theme of the Book of Daniel is God's sovereignty over history, and the theme of the tales in chapters 1–6 is that God is sovereign over all earthly kings. Daniel 1 introduces the fundamental question that runs through the entire book, how God may continue to work his plans when all seems lost. Chapter 1 introduces God as the figure in control of all that happens, the possessor of sovereign will and power: he "gives" Jehoiachim into Nebuchadnezzar's hands, he "gives" Daniel "grace and mercies", and it is he who gives the four young Jews their "knowledge and skill". It was God who took Daniel and his friends into Babylonian exile, and it is God who is the source of their gifts and salvation.

== Interpretation ==
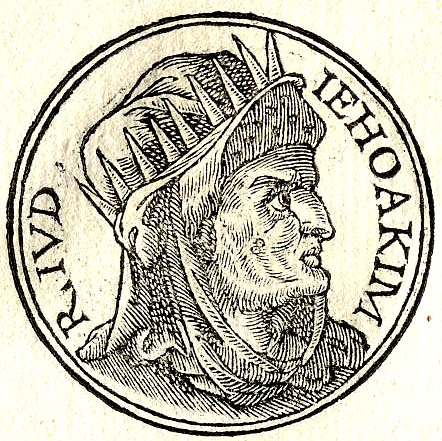
Jehoiakim from Guillaume Rouillé's Promptuarii Iconum Insigniorum, 1553

=== Daniel 1 and history ===
According to the opening verses of Daniel 1 the hero's captivity began when Nebuchadnezzar "besieged" Jerusalem in the third year of King Jehoiakim (606 BCE), but it is difficult to harmonise these verses with known history:

- According to other sources in the Bible, Nebuchadnezzar did not begin to reign until the fourth year of Jehoiakim (Jeremiah 25:1);
- The Babylonian chronicles note Nebuchadnezzar's campaigns in Palestine as Crown Prince before this, but none are on Jerusalem;
- All the sources, Biblical and Babylonian, mention an attack on Jerusalem in 597, but none prior.

Daniel's story ends with his final vision in the third year of Cyrus (Daniel 10:1 – chapters 11 and 12 of the book are the continuation of the same final vision). The third year of Cyrus was 536 BCE, and the although the fact that this falls exactly 70 years after 586 may not be significant (the author never draws attention to it), it strikes a chord with Daniel 9, where he introduces the prophecy of a 70-year time-span for the exile. He has apparently drawn his history from 2 Chronicles 36:5–7, which says that Nebuchadnezzar took Jehoiakim to Babylon (he took Zedekiah, who became king on his death), and 2 Kings 24:1, which says that Jehoiakim served Nebuchadnezzar three years and then rebelled. The story of the noble Daniel and his friends being taken off to Babylon could be viewed as a fulfillment of the prophet Isaiah's warning to King Hezekiah that his sons would become eunuchs in the palace of the king of Babylon (Isaiah 39:7), although this does not mean that the story was inspired by this verse.

=== Daniel's refusal of the royal food ===
There has been much scholarly discussion of the reasons for Daniel's refusal of the king's ration. The explanation perhaps most commonly found is that Daniel and his friends wished to avoid breaking the Jewish religious laws regarding ritual slaughter (the kosher laws); alternatively, they may have wished to avoid meat and wine as these, unlike vegetables and water, were regularly used in offerings to gods (in this case, the gods of Babylon). In either case, the theological point being made is that the Jewish youths are remaining loyal to the God of Israel while still serving the foreign king.

=== The authors of the Book of Daniel ===
The portrayal of Daniel and his companions as noble and educated youths may reflect the circle of the book's authors: the Jewish youths serve a foreign king while remaining true to the Jewish law. This circle are identified later in the book, in chapters 11 and 12, as the maskilim, "the wise", teachers who will "give understanding" and "lead many to righteousness," despite the suffering they will endure in the end-time of persecution. It is these 2nd-century BCE teachers of wisdom who stand behind the author of the book of Daniel.
