= Ezekiel 48 =

Last chapter of the Book of Ezekiel

- ← chapter 47 Daniel 1 →
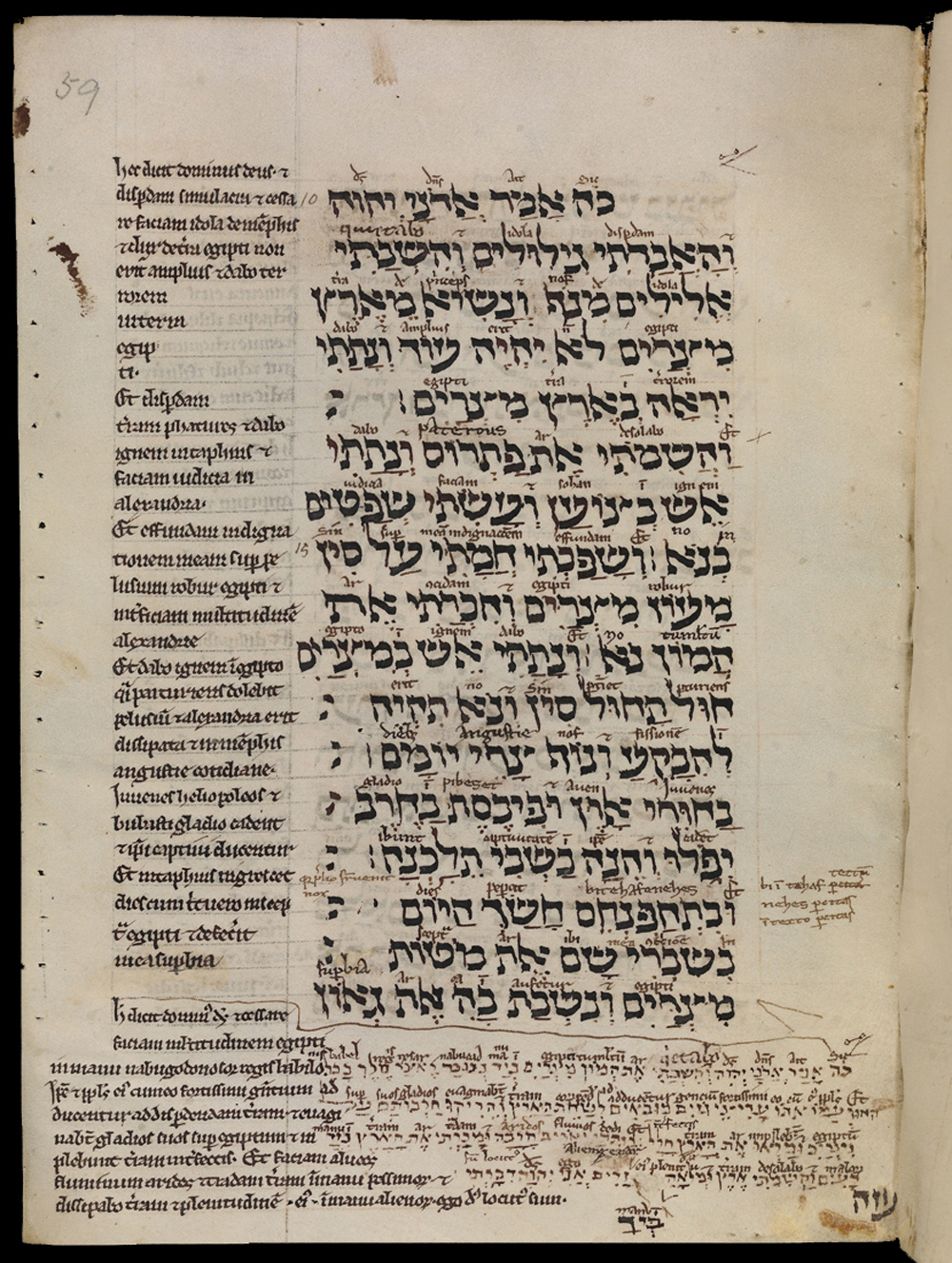
- Book of Ezekiel 30:13–18 in an English manuscript from early 13th century, MS. Bodl. Or. 62, fol. 59a. A Latin translation appears in the margins with further interlineations above the Hebrew.
- Book: Book of Ezekiel
- Hebrew Bible part: Nevi'im
- Order in the Hebrew part: 7
- Category: Latter Prophets
- Christian Bible part: Old Testament
- Order in the Christian part: 26

Ezekiel 48 is the forty-eighth (and the last) chapter of the Book of Ezekiel in the Hebrew Bible or the Old Testament of the Christian Bible. This book contains the prophecies attributed to the prophet/priest Ezekiel, and is one of the Books of the Prophets. Chapters 40-48 give the ideal picture of a new temple. The Jerusalem Bible refers to this section as "the Torah of Ezekiel".

This chapter contains Ezekiel's vision of the land allocated to the twelve tribes (Ezekiel 48:1-7 and 23–29), the sanctuary (verses 8–14), the city and its suburbs (verses 15–20), the prince (verses 21–22) and the dimensions and gates of the city (verses 30–35). The vision was given on the 25th anniversary of Ezekiel's exile, "April 28, 573 BCE", 14 years after the fall of Jerusalem and 12 years after the last messages of hope in chapter 39.

== Text ==
The original text was written in the Hebrew language. This chapter is divided into 35 verses.

=== Textual witnesses ===
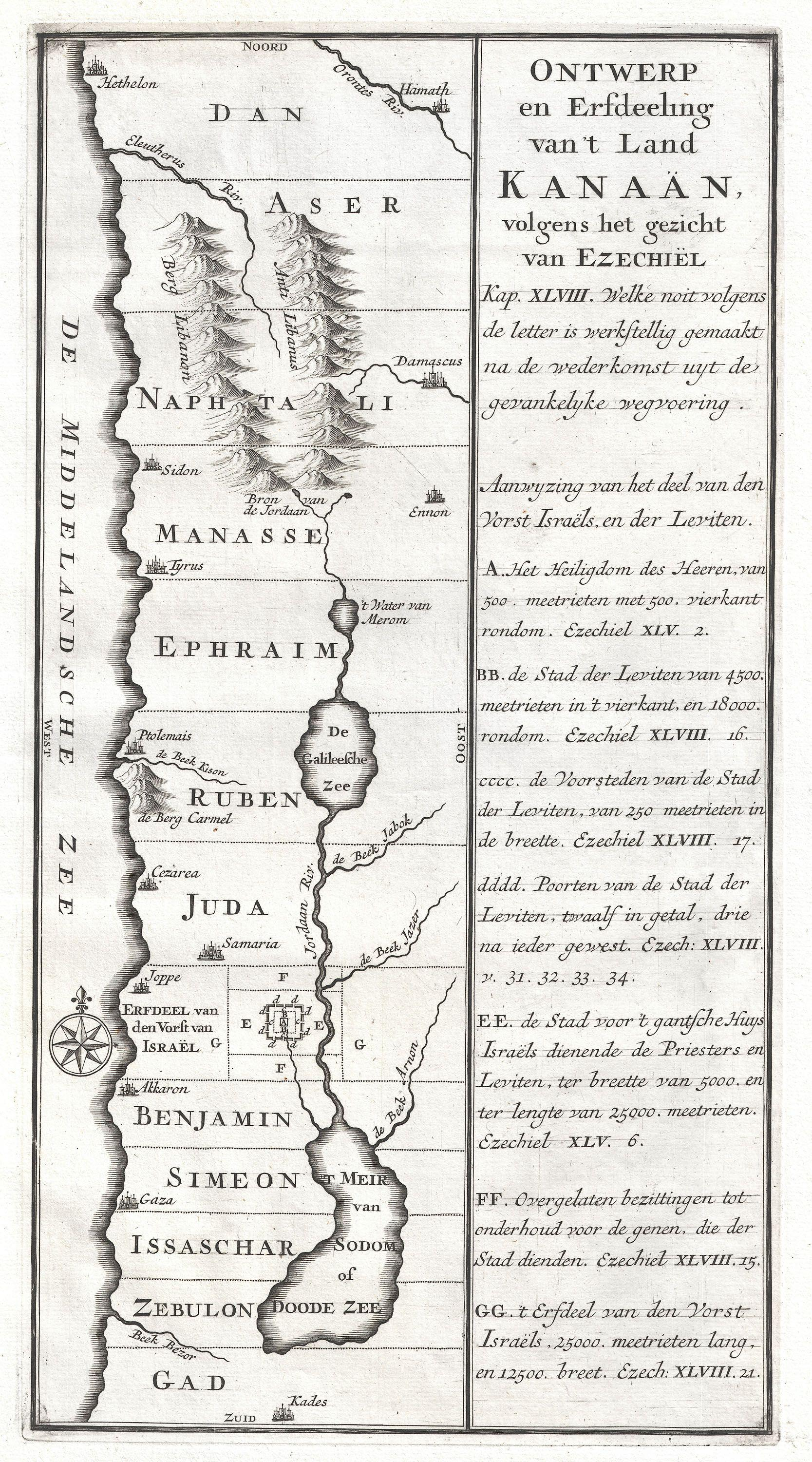
A map of ancient Israel, most likely drawn by the Dutch engraver Schryver in 1729, showing Israel from Hethelon in the north to Kades, just south of the Dead Sea, mostly drawn from the Book of Ezekiel, describing the region.

Some early manuscripts containing the text of this chapter in Hebrew are of the Masoretic Text tradition, which includes the Codex Cairensis (895), the Petersburg Codex of the Prophets (916), Aleppo Codex (10th century), Codex Leningradensis (1008).

There is also a translation into Koine Greek known as the Septuagint, made in the last few centuries BC. Extant ancient manuscripts of the Septuagint version include Codex Vaticanus (B; $\mathfrak{G}$^{B}; 4th century), Codex Alexandrinus (A; $\mathfrak{G}$^{A}; 5th century) and Codex Marchalianus (Q; $\mathfrak{G}$^{Q}; 6th century). (Note: Ezekiel is missing from the extant Codex Sinaiticus.)

== Structure ==
The New King James Version divides this chapter into two sections:

- Ezekiel 48:1–29 = Division of the Land
- Ezekiel 48:30–35 = The Gates of the City and its Name

== The northern tribes (48:1–7) ==
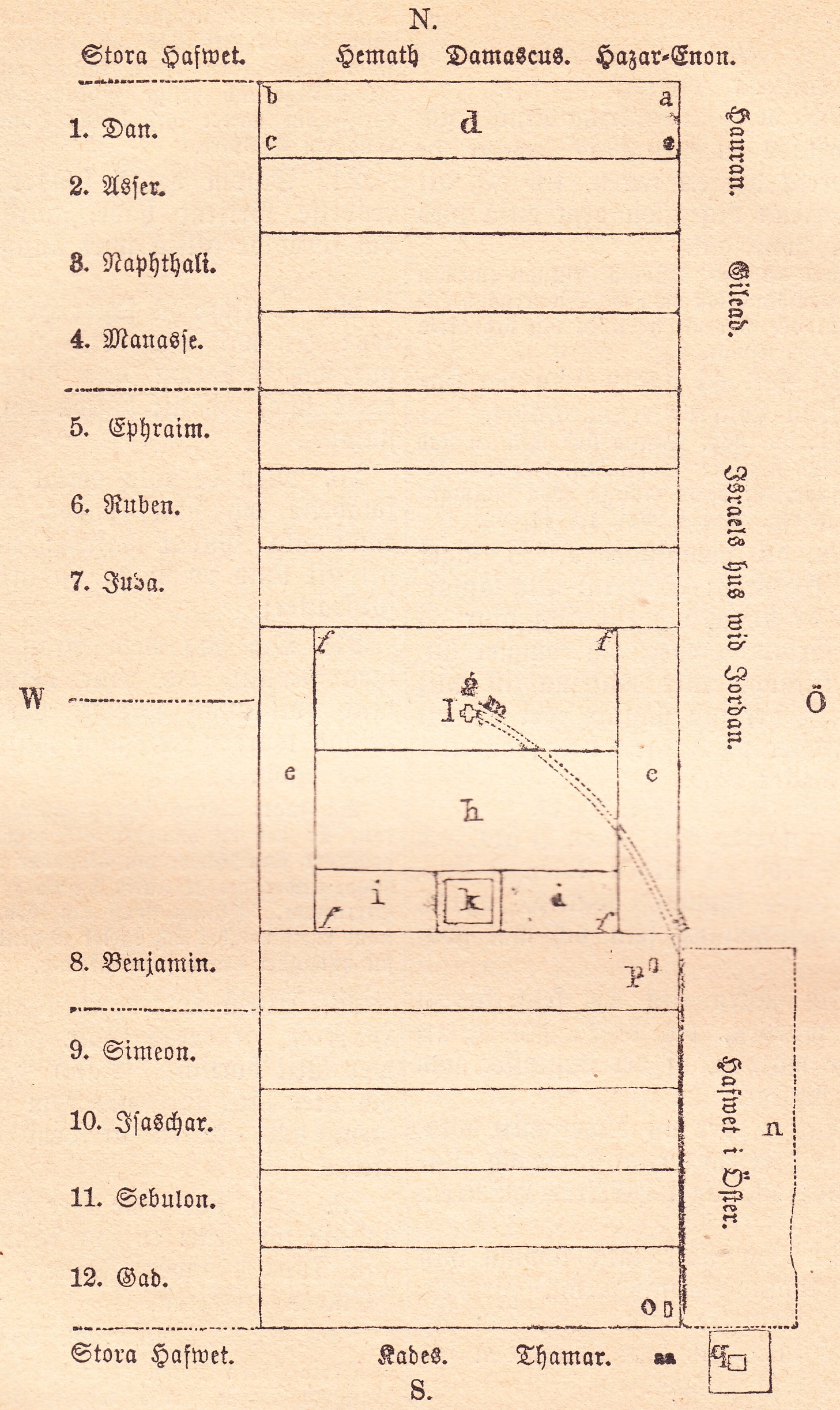
Diagram of the Holy land according to Ezekiel, the prophet. In: "Biblia, det är All den Heliga Skrift, af P. Fjellstedt." Second volume. New edition (1890).

This section deals with the allotments of the land north of Jerusalem, as the land is divided by borders running east to west into parallel strips of unspecified width. The distribution is different from the earlier portions of the tribes of Israel, which were named after the sons of Jacob (Genesis 35:22–26 also called "Israel") and his two grandsons, the sons of Joseph (cf. Ezekiel 47:13).

=== Verse 1 ===
Now these are the names of the tribes: From the northern border along the road to Hethlon at the entrance of Hamath, to Hazar Enan, the border of Damascus northward, in the direction of Hamath, there shall be one section for Dan from its east to its west side.

Hethlon has been identified as modern Heitela in Syria, although theologian Tremper Longman claimed recently that its exact location is still unknown.

The tribe of Joseph receives two portions, while the priestly tribe of Levi receives none, maintaining a total allotment of twelve.

== The central strip (48:8–22) ==
This part gives more details on the piece of land described in Ezekiel 45:1–8, which consists of the sacred reserve, the city reserve and the prince's allotment.

== The southern tribes (48:23–29) ==
The distribution of the land follows the style of verses 1–7 for the areas south of the central strip, with the tribe of Gad receiving the southernmost allotment, whereas formerly only the portions of the tribes of Judah and Simeon lay south of Jerusalem. The section has a proper conclusion in verse 29.

== The new Jerusalem (48:30–35) ==
The last section of the book records the vision of the "structure like a city" seen by Ezekiel in Ezekiel 40:2. These verses apparently are added from a different source, focusing the city gates on each of the four sides, and each gate is named after a certain tribe (cf. Revelation 21:12f) to complete 'a picture of perfect order and harmony'. This new city is different from the Jerusalem in history, because the gates of the post-exilic Jerusalem in Nehemiah time were carefully noted, yet none was named after the tribes (cf. Nehemiah 3), although in the pre-exilic period there were a Benjamin gate and an Ephraim gate (Jeremiah 37:13; 2 Kings 14:13), but both were on the north side, not the east side, of the city. Also, in the new city, Levi stands as one of the twelve tribes with its own gate, whereas Ephraim and Manasseh are represented by a single "Joseph" gate. The order of gate naming seems to have its own logic, with the children of Leah on the north (Judah, Levi and Ruben) and south sides (Simeon, Issachar and Zebulun), the children of Rachel on the east side (Joseph and Benjamin, together with Dan, the eldest son of Bilhah, Rachel's handmaid) and the remaining children of the concubines (Gad, Asher and Naphtali) grouped together on the west. The arrangement recalls the order of tribal camps surrounding the tabernacle, three on each of the four sides (Numbers 2), that brings the clear idea of "diverse but united people organized around a sacred point of reference," that is "the divine presence in its midst".

=== Verse 35 ===
"All the way around shall be eighteen thousand cubits; and the name of the city from that day shall be: THE LORD IS THERE."

- "18000 cubits": about 6 miles (9 km).
- "THE LORD IS THERE": (Hebrew: יהוה ׀ שמה Yah-weh shām-māh), the new name of the city (Isaiah 1:26; Isaiah 60:14; Isaiah 62:2; Jeremiah 3:17; Jeremiah 33:15–16; Zechariah 8:3; Revelation 21:12–14). The city is not named until it is given this designation in the final verse of the book.

== See also ==
- Great Sea
- Hamath
- Hazar Enan
- Hethlon
- Israel
- Kadesh
- Meribah
- Negev
- New Jerusalem Dead Sea Scroll
- Third Temple
- Tribe of Asher
- Tribe of Benjamin
- Tribe of Dan
- Tribe of Gad
- Tribe of Ephraim
- Tribe of Issachar
- Tribe of Joseph
- Tribe of Judah
- Tribe of Levi
- Tribe of Manasseh
- Tribe of Naphtali
- Tribe of Reuben
- Tribe of Simeon
- Tribe of Zebulon
- Zadok
- Related Bible parts: Isaiah 1, Isaiah 60, Isaiah 62, Jeremiah 3, Jeremiah 33, Zechariah 8, Ezekiel 10, Ezekiel 47, Revelation 21, Revelation 22

== Sources ==
- Blenkinsopp, Joseph (2012). Ezekiel: Interpretation: A Bible Commentary for Teaching and Preaching. Presbyterian Publishing Corporation. ISBN 9781611641738.
- Bromiley, Geoffrey W. (1995). International Standard Bible Encyclopedia: vol. iv, Q-Z. Eerdmans. ISBN 9780802837844.
- Brown, Francis; Briggs, Charles A.; Driver, S. R. (1994). The Brown-Driver-Briggs Hebrew and English Lexicon (reprint ed.). Hendrickson Publishers. ISBN 978-1565632066.
- Carley, Keith W. (1974). The Book of the Prophet Ezekiel. Cambridge Bible Commentaries on the New English Bible (illustrated ed.). Cambridge University Press. ISBN 9780521097550.
- Clements, Ronald E (1996). Ezekiel. Westminster John Knox Press. ISBN 9780664252724.
- Coogan, Michael David (2007). Coogan, Michael David; Brettler, Marc Zvi; Newsom, Carol Ann; Perkins, Pheme (eds.). The New Oxford Annotated Bible with the Apocryphal/Deuterocanonical Books: New Revised Standard Version, Issue 48 (Augmented 3rd ed.). Oxford University Press. ISBN 9780195288810.
- Galambush, J. (2007). "25. Ezekiel". In Barton, John; Muddiman, John (eds.). The Oxford Bible Commentary (first (paperback) ed.). Oxford University Press. pp. 533–562. ISBN 978-0199277186.
- Gesenius, H. W. F. (1979). Gesenius' Hebrew and Chaldee Lexicon to the Old Testament Scriptures: Numerically Coded to Strong's Exhaustive Concordance, with an English Index. Translated by Tregelles, Samuel Prideaux (7th ed.). Baker Book House.
- Joyce, Paul M. (2009). Ezekiel: A Commentary. Continuum. ISBN 9780567483614.
- The Nelson Study Bible. Thomas Nelson, Inc. 1997. ISBN 9780840715999.
- Würthwein, Ernst (1995). The Text of the Old Testament. Translated by Rhodes, Erroll F. Grand Rapids, MI: Wm. B. Eerdmans. ISBN 0-8028-0788-7.
