= Ezekiel 39 =

Book of Ezekiel, chapter 39

- ← chapter 38 chapter 40 →
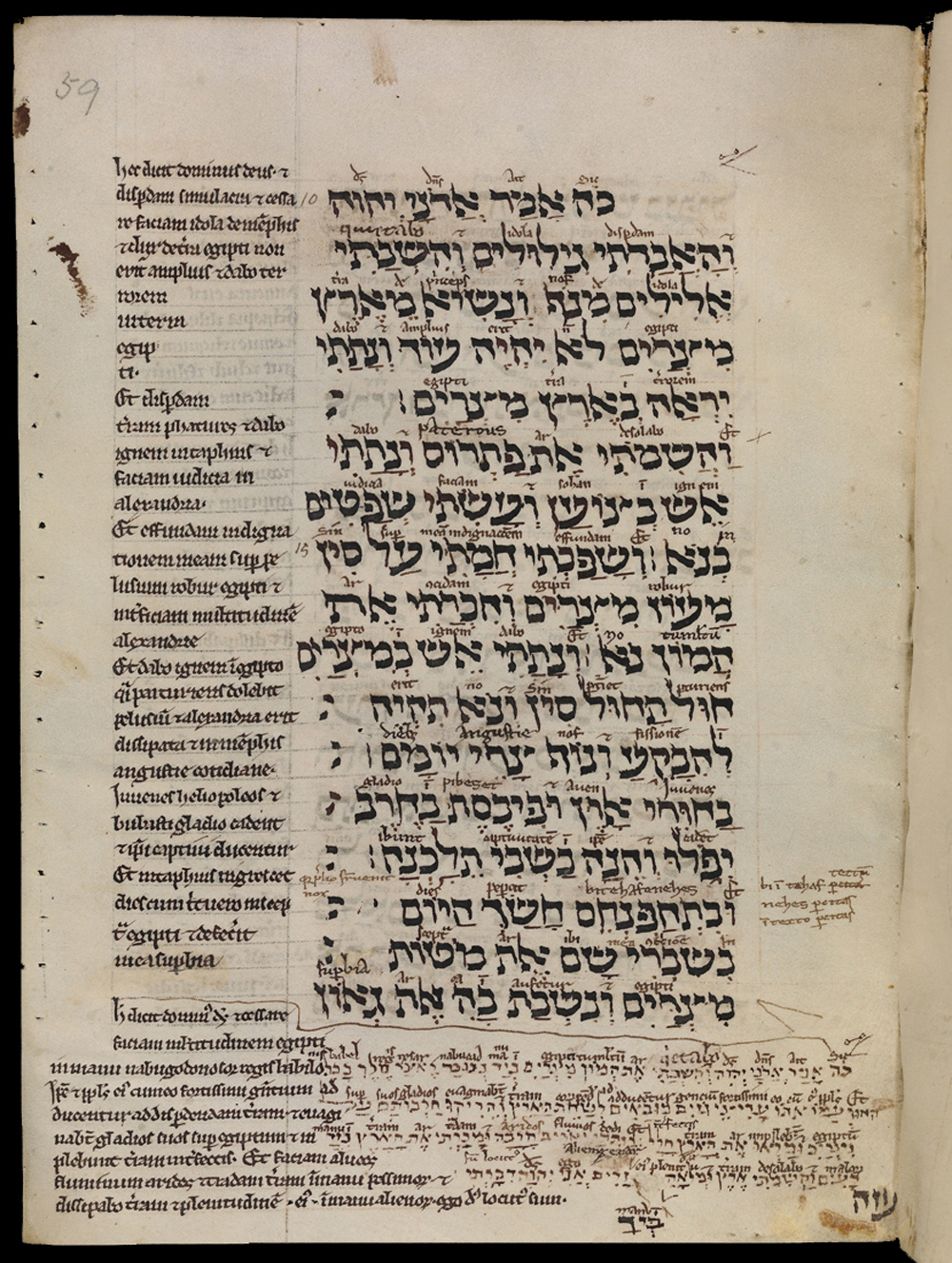
- Book of Ezekiel 30:13–18 in an English manuscript from the early 13th century, MS. Bodl. Or. 62, fol. 59a. A Latin translation appears in the margins with further interlineations above the Hebrew.
- Book: Book of Ezekiel
- Hebrew Bible part: Nevi'im
- Order in the Hebrew part: 7
- Category: Latter Prophets
- Christian Bible part: Old Testament
- Order in the Christian part: 26

Ezekiel 39 is the thirty-ninth chapter of the Book of Ezekiel in the Hebrew Bible or the Old Testament of the Christian Bible. This book contains the prophecies attributed to the prophet/priest Ezekiel, and is one of the Books of the Prophets. The previous chapter and verses 1-16 of this chapter form a section dealing with "Gog, of the land of Magog".

== Text ==
The original text was written in the Hebrew language. This chapter is divided into 29 verses. The New King James Version divides this chapter into the following sections:

- Ezekiel 39:1–10 = Gog's Armies Destroyed
- Ezekiel 39:11–16 = The Burial of Gog
- Ezekiel 39:17–20 = A Triumphant Festival
- Ezekiel 39:21–29 = Israel Restored to the Land

=== Textual witnesses ===
Some early manuscripts containing the text of this chapter in Hebrew are of the Masoretic Text tradition, which includes the Codex Cairensis (895), the Petersburg Codex of the Prophets (916), Aleppo Codex (10th century), Codex Leningradensis (1008).

There is also a translation into Koine Greek known as the Septuagint, made in the last few centuries BC. Extant ancient manuscripts of the Septuagint version include Codex Vaticanus (B; $\mathfrak{G}$^{B}; 4th century), Codex Alexandrinus (A; $\mathfrak{G}$^{A}; 5th century) and Codex Marchalianus (Q; $\mathfrak{G}$^{Q}; 6th century). (Note: Ezekiel is missing from the extant Codex Sinaiticus.)

== Verse 1 ==
"And you, son of man, prophesy against Gog, and say, ‘Thus says the Lord God: “Behold, I am against you, O Gog, the prince of Rosh, Meshech, and Tubal" (NKJV)

- "Son of man" (Hebrew: בן־אדם ḇen-’ā-ḏām): this phrase is used 93 times to address Ezekiel.
- "Rosh" (Hebrew: ראש rōsh): can also be translated as "head" (of human and animal); "top" (of the mountain); "beginning" (of time); "river-head"; "chief" (as in "chief-prince", "chief-priest", head of the family). In conjunction to the preceding word "prince", most English Bibles translates them as "chief prince".

== Verses 16-24 ==
In these verses, Ezekiel says that God "invites the fowls of the heaven and the beasts of the earth to a great feast, a sacrificial meal which he shall slay for them". Biblical commentator Andrew B. Davidson notes that "all slaughtering of animals was a sacrificial act" in ancient times. Likewise in Revelation 19:17–18, the angel standing in the sun invites all the birds of the air to gather at God's great feast.

== Verse 25 ==
Therefore thus says the Lord God: ‘Now I will bring back the captives of Jacob, and have mercy on the whole house of Israel; and I will be jealous for My holy name’ (NKJV)

- "Now I will bring back" (Hebrew: עתה אשיב ‘at-tāh ’ā-shîḇ): denoting restoration before the end times.

== See also ==
- Bashan
- Gog
- Hamonah
- Israel
- Jacob
- Magog
- Meshech
- Rosh
- Tubal
- Valley of Hamon-Gog
- Related Bible parts: Genesis 10, Psalm 83, Ezekiel 38, Revelation 20

== Bibliography ==
- Bromiley, Geoffrey W. (1995). International Standard Bible Encyclopedia: vol. iv, Q-Z. Eerdmans. ISBN 9780802837844.
- Brown, Francis; Briggs, Charles A.; Driver, S. R. (1994). The Brown-Driver-Briggs Hebrew and English Lexicon (reprint ed.). Hendrickson Publishers. ISBN 978-1565632066.
- Clements, Ronald E (1996). Ezekiel. Westminster John Knox Press. ISBN 9780664252724.
- Gesenius, H. W. F. (1979). Gesenius' Hebrew and Chaldee Lexicon to the Old Testament Scriptures: Numerically Coded to Strong's Exhaustive Concordance, with an English Index. Translated by Tregelles, Samuel Prideaux (7th ed.). Baker Book House.
- Joyce, Paul M. (2009). Ezekiel: A Commentary. Continuum. ISBN 9780567483614.
- Würthwein, Ernst (1995). The Text of the Old Testament. Translated by Rhodes, Erroll F. Grand Rapids, MI: Wm. B. Eerdmans. ISBN 0-8028-0788-7.
