= Ezekiel 3 =

Book of Ezekiel, chapter 3

- ← chapter 2 chapter 4 →
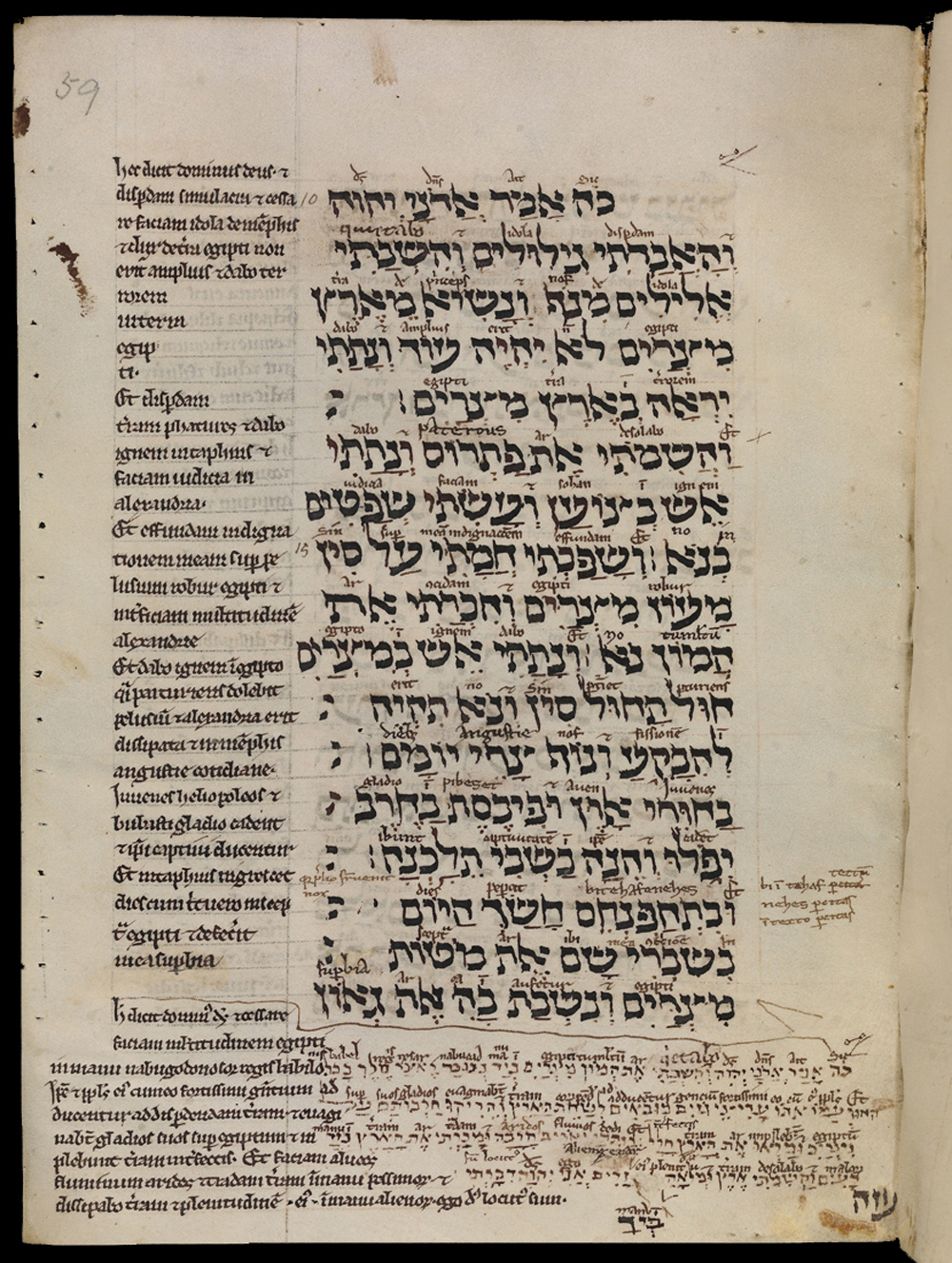
- Book of Ezekiel 30:13–18 in an English manuscript from the early 13th century, MS. Bodl. Or. 62, fol. 59a. A Latin translation appears in the margins with further interlineations above the Hebrew.
- Book: Book of Ezekiel
- Hebrew Bible part: Nevi'im
- Order in the Hebrew part: 7
- Category: Latter Prophets
- Christian Bible part: Old Testament
- Order in the Christian part: 26

Ezekiel 3 is the third chapter of the Book of Ezekiel in the Hebrew Bible or the Old Testament of the Christian Bible. This book contains the prophecies attributed to the prophet/priest Ezekiel, and is one of the Books of the Prophets. This chapter contains the call to Ezekiel to speak to the people of Israel and to act as a sentry for them.

== Text ==
The original text was written in the Hebrew language. This chapter is divided into 27 verses.

=== Textual witnesses ===
Some early manuscripts containing the text of this chapter in Hebrew are of the Masoretic Text tradition, which includes the Codex Cairensis (895), the Petersburg Codex of the Prophets (916), Aleppo Codex (10th century), Codex Leningradensis (1008).

There is also a translation into Koine Greek known as the Septuagint, made in the last few centuries BC. Extant ancient manuscripts of the Septuagint version include Codex Vaticanus (B; $\mathfrak{G}$^{B}; 4th century), Codex Alexandrinus (A; $\mathfrak{G}$^{A}; 5th century) and Codex Marchalianus (Q; $\mathfrak{G}$^{Q}; 6th century). (Note: Ezekiel is missing from Codex Sinaiticus.)

== The responsibility of the prophet (3:1–15) ==
=== Verse 1 ===
He said to me, "Son of man, eat what you find; eat this scroll, and go, speak to the house of Israel".

"Son of man" is sometimes translated "O mortal", as in the New Revised Standard Version. Ezekiel is called 'son of man' here and throughout the remainder of the book, not as an honorific title, but as a mark of the distance between this 'mere mortal' and his divine interlocutor". Similarly, the prophet Jeremiah records that he "found" and "ate" the words of God. A flying scroll also features in the sixth of the eight visions of the prophet Zechariah.

=== Verse 3 ===
And He said to me,

"Son of man, feed your belly, and fill your stomach with this scroll that I give you."

So I ate,

and it was in my mouth like honey in sweetness.

- "Like honey in sweetness": Although the scroll contains "lamentations and mourning and woe" (Ezekiel 2:10), when eaten it tastes "as sweet as honey" in the mouth (Revelation 10:9–10). The phrase affirms the saying that 'God's word was sweet' (Psalm 19:10; Psalm 119:103).

=== Verse 15 ===
Then I came to the captives at Tel Abib, who dwelt by the River Chebar;
and I sat where they sat, and remained there astonished among them seven days.

- "Tel Abib" (Hebrew: תל-אביב, Tel Aviv; lit. "Spring Mound", where "Spring (Aviv) is the season") is an unidentified place on the Kebar Canal, near Nippur in what is now Iraq. The Kebar or Chebar river was part of a complex network of irrigation and transport canals that also included the Shatt el-Nil, a silted up canal toward the east of Babylon.
- "Astonished" is read as "astonied" in the Revised Version, i.e. dumb and motionless. The seven-day long "period of motionless silence" seems to express "the strength of the prophet’s emotions" on his arrival at Tel Abib.

== Ezekiel as a watchman for Israel (3:16–27) ==
=== Verse 16 ===
And it came to pass at the end of seven days, that the word of the Lord came unto me, saying,

- "At the end of seven days": During these days, Ezekiel had enough opportunity to be among the exiles, and was able to see the sphere and materials of his work, before his appointment to be a watchman.

=== Verse 23 ===
So I arose and went out into the plain, and behold, the glory of the Lord stood there, like the glory which I saw by the River Chebar; and I fell on my face.

- "River Chebar": see notes on "Tel Abib" in verse 15.
- "The plain": links this first vision of Ezekiel to the other vision in Ezekiel 37.

=== Verse 27 ===
But when I speak with you, I will open your mouth,

and you shall say to them,

"Thus says the Lord God."
He who hears, let him hear;

and he who refuses, let him refuse;

for they are a rebellious house.

The theme of dumbness and periodic restoration of speech emphasize that the word spoken by Ezekiel is from God, not the prophet's.

== See also ==
- Chebar River
- Son of man
- Related Bible parts: Ezekiel 1, Ezekiel 10, Ezekiel 43, Mark 4, Revelation 10

== Sources ==
- Carley, Keith W. (1974). The Book of the Prophet Ezekiel. Cambridge Bible Commentaries on the New English Bible (illustrated ed.). Cambridge University Press. ISBN 9780521097550.
- Clements, Ronald E (1996). Ezekiel. Westminster John Knox Press. ISBN 9780664252724.
- Coogan, Michael David (2007). Coogan, Michael David; Brettler, Marc Zvi; Newsom, Carol Ann; Perkins, Pheme (eds.). The New Oxford Annotated Bible with the Apocryphal/Deuterocanonical Books: New Revised Standard Version, Issue 48 (Augmented 3rd ed.). Oxford University Press. ISBN 9780195288810.
- Galambush, J. (2007). "25. Ezekiel". In Barton, John; Muddiman, John (eds.). The Oxford Bible Commentary (first (paperback) ed.). Oxford University Press. pp. 533–562. ISBN 978-0199277186.
- Joyce, Paul M. (2009). Ezekiel: A Commentary. Continuum. ISBN 9780567483614.
- Würthwein, Ernst (1995). The Text of the Old Testament. Translated by Rhodes, Erroll F. Grand Rapids, MI: Wm. B. Eerdmans. ISBN 0-8028-0788-7.
