= Ezekiel Airship =

Early experimental aircraft inspired by and named after the Book of Ezekiel

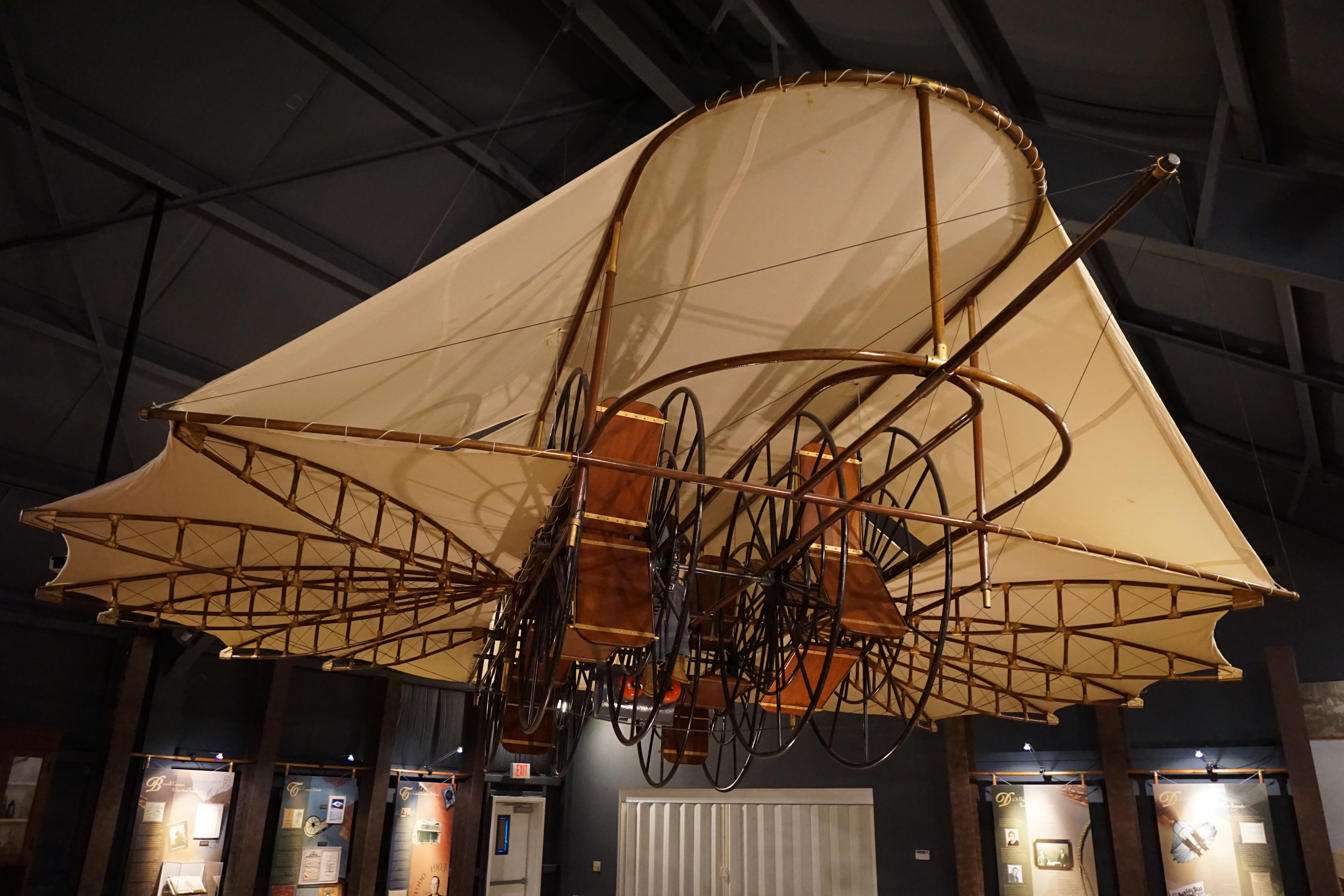
- Ezekiel Airship replica on museum display

General information
- Type: Experimental, pioneer aircraft
- National origin: United States
- Designer: Burrell Cannon
- Number built: 1

History
- First flight: 1902 (claimed)
- Preserved at: Replica on display at the Northeast Texas Rural Heritage Center and Museum
- Fate: Destroyed in a storm near Texarkana, circa 1904

The Ezekiel Airship was an early experimental aircraft conceived, designed, and built by the Baptist minister Burrell Cannon, an experienced sawmill operator born in 1848 in Coffeeville, Mississippi. Inspired by and named after the Book of Ezekiel, the craft's design featured four "wheel within a wheel" paddle wheels powered by a four-cylinder gasoline engine. There are unverified claims that it was flown in 1902 in Pittsburg, Texas, a year before the Wright Flyer flew at Kitty Hawk, North Carolina.

On an unspecified Sunday in 1902, the aircraft is alleged to have flown approximately 160 feet (49 m) at a height of between 10 feet (3.0 m) and 12 feet (3.7 m) in the presence of only a handful of witnesses; there is, however, no physical evidence that such a flight ever took place. Historians have generally discounted claims that the airship ever flew, although some believe that it may have achieved uncontrolled flight.

The original aircraft was destroyed in a storm near Texarkana, en route to St. Louis for the 1904 World's Fair, while in 1922 Cannon's original plans were destroyed in a fire. In the 1980s, a full-size replica of the Ezekiel Airship was built and initially displayed in the Pittsburg Hot Links Restaurant until 2001, when it was moved to its present location in the city's Northeast Texas Rural Heritage Center and Museum.

== Background ==
The Ezekiel Airship was the brainchild of Baptist minister Burrell Cannon, who was born in Coffeeville, Mississippi, in April 1848. A sawmiller by trade, he migrated to East Texas in search of the opportunities presented by its relatively plentiful hardwood forests. Described as a "Renaissance man in an industrial age", Cannon had a strong command of engineering principles and held patents for six different inventions, including designs ranging from marine propellers to windmills to cameras. Claimed by some to have spoken eight different languages, Cannon preached "on the side" in a number of small East Texas towns before turning his attention to human-powered flight in the late 1890s.

== Design ==
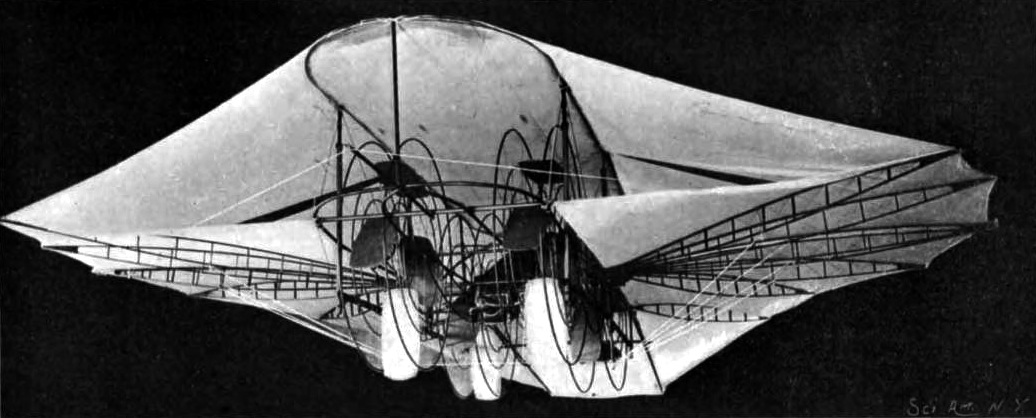
A 1901 photograph of the original Ezekiel Airship

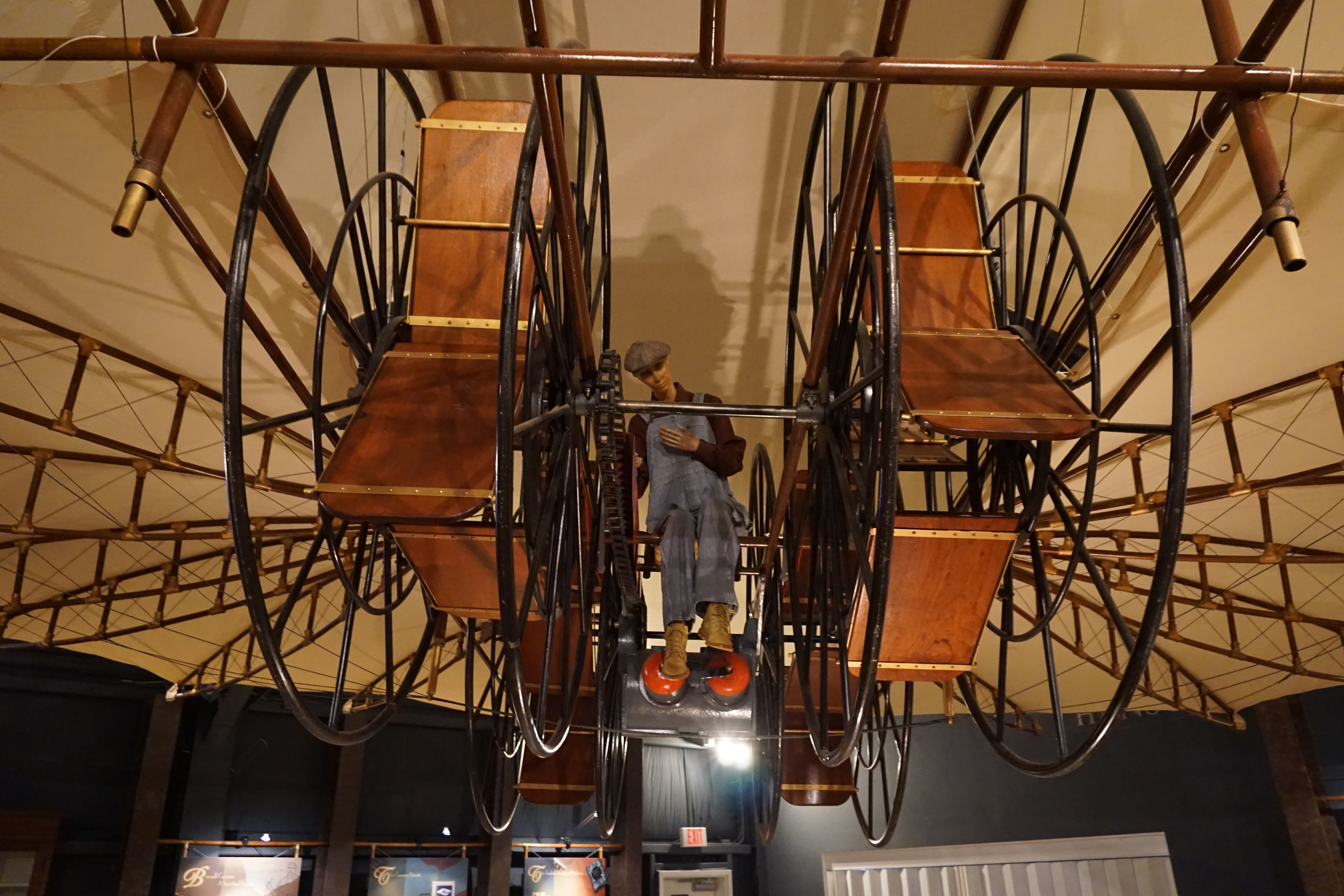
Ezekiel Airship replica, view from front and below

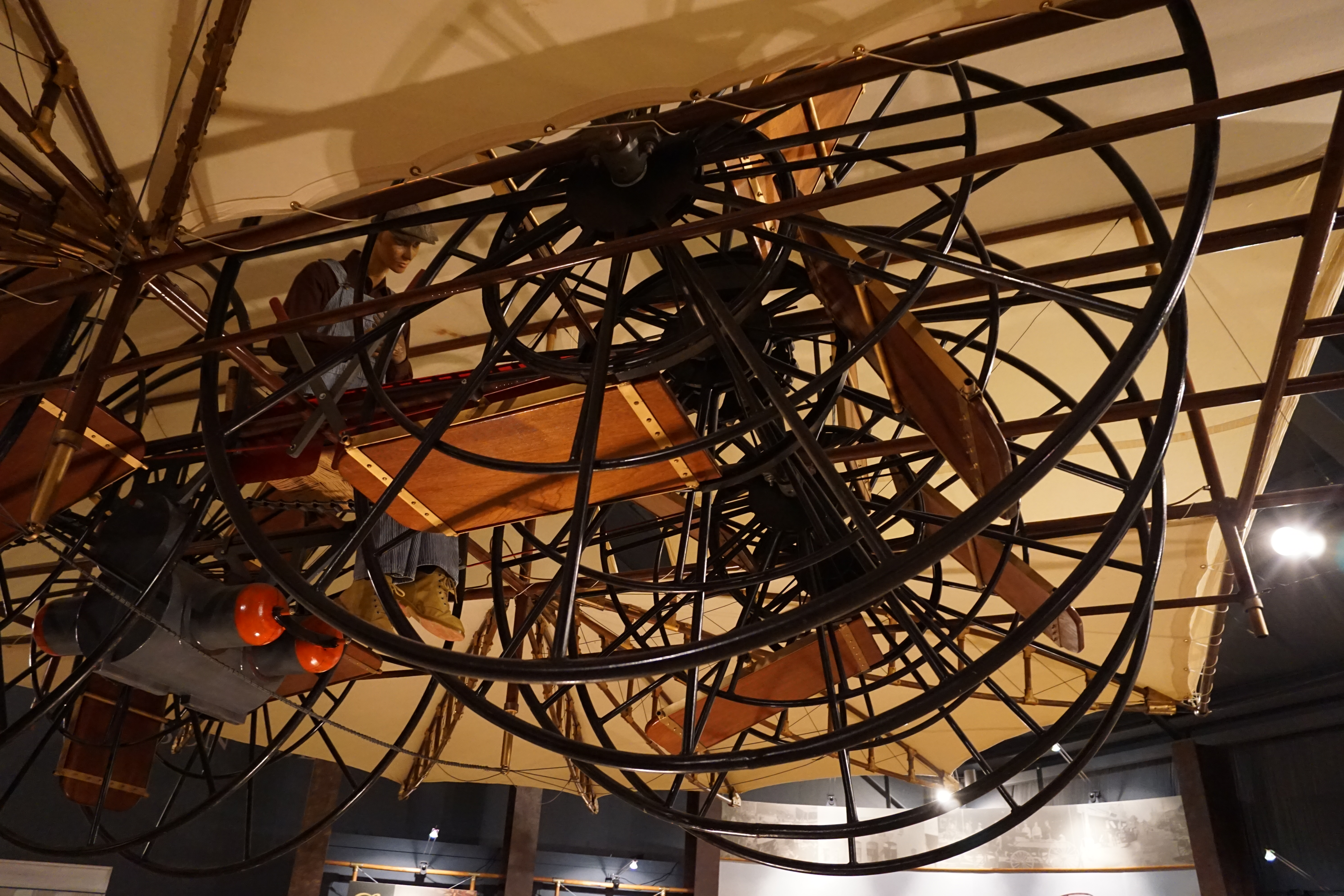
Ezekiel Airship replica, view from side and below

The aircraft was designed and built by Cannon along with a number of other local inventors who were affiliated with Cannon's investor-supported Ezekiel Airship Company. Built at the P. W. Thorsell Foundry in Pittsburg by three employees who worked full-time for Cannon, the project was financed by $20,000 in stock certificates.

The airship was inspired by the Book of Ezekiel, both in name and general design. Cannon drew particular inspiration from Ezekiel's vision in Ezekiel 1:16: "The appearance of the wheels and their work was like unto the color of beryl; and they four had one likeness; and their appearance was as it were a wheel within the middle of the wheel." For Cannon, the pertinent text continued with Ezekiel 1:19: "And when the living creatures went, the wheels went by them...And when the living creatures were lifted up from the earth, the wheels were lifted up."

The aircraft design featured a three-part wing made of fabric that measured 26 feet (7.9 m); it was powered by four sets of paddle wheels that were driven by a four-cylinder gasoline engine, while the pilot sat at the center of the machine. According to Scott Gold, the airship was designed to take off horizontally, like a conventional airplane, but to land vertically, like a helicopter. Robert Peoples described the aircraft's design as being reminiscent of that of a paddleboat.

Before its claimed flight, the Ezekiel Airship was profiled in the October 12, 1901 issue of Scientific American. The uncredited article focuses largely upon Cannon's biblical inspirations for the project, noting his belief in "a purpose in every word of the Scriptures". It also highlights Cannon's opinion that "Ezekiel's plans are the first he ever worked at in which he could suggest no improvement". The article describes some of the aircraft's specifications, such as its planned engine speed of 400 to 1,200 revolutions per minute, as well as an overview of Cannon's approach to heavier-than-air flight.

== Claimed flight ==
On an unspecified Sunday in 1902, the Ezekiel Airship is claimed to have flown in Pittsburg, Texas, a year before the Wright Flyer flew at Kitty Hawk, North Carolina. According to these claims, the craft flew approximately 160 feet (49 m) at a height of between 10 feet (3.0 m) and 12 feet (3.7 m) in the presence of only a handful of witnesses; those involved allegedly took an oath of silence, and there is no physical evidence to support any of their claims. Cannon himself was not present during the alleged flight, moreover, as he was preaching at a local church at the time. Foundry worker Gus Stamps was claimed to have been the craft's pilot. No patents or blueprints of the craft nor photographs of its alleged flight are known to exist.

== Aftermath ==
The original Ezekiel Airship was destroyed in a storm near Texarkana, en route to St. Louis for the 1904 World's Fair. Cannon had accepted a challenge extended by the organizers of the World's Fair promising $100,000 to anyone who could make a "sustained, controlled flight" in St. Louis.

The destruction of the airship caused Cannon to give up on it as a specific project, but it did not deter him from continuing to tinker and invent; 10 years later, he built a second aircraft that was ultimately destroyed during testing. Furthermore, at the time of his death in 1922, he was working on developing a combination "cotton picker and boll weevil destroyer". Also in 1922, all of Cannon's original plans for the Ezekiel Airship were destroyed in a fire.

== Legacy ==
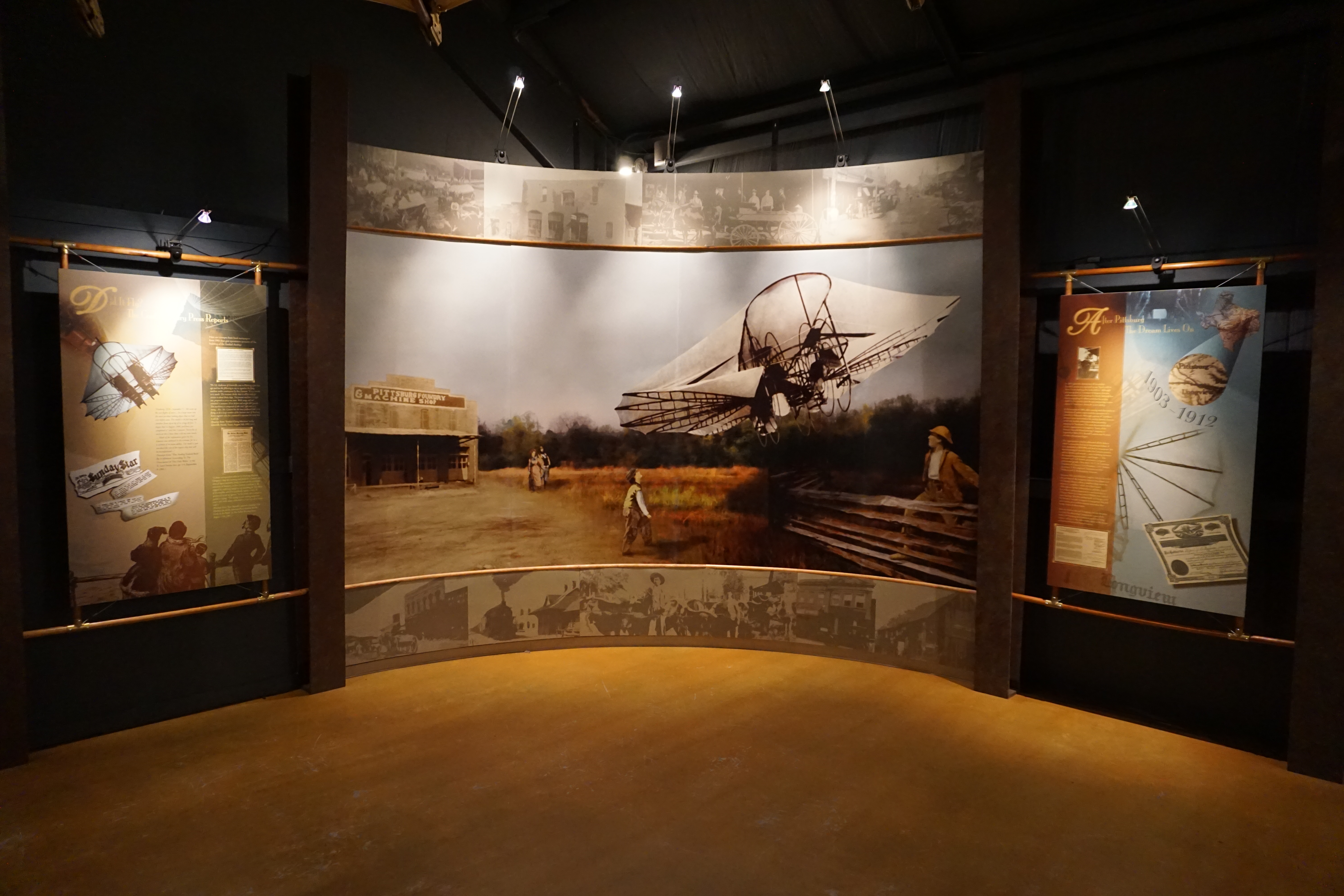
Ezekiel Airship exhibit at the Northeast Texas Rural Heritage Center and Museum

In 1986 and 1987, a full-size replica of the Ezekiel Airship was built by local craftsman Bob Lowery and the Pittsburg Optimist Club, based largely on a single surviving photograph. It weighs roughly 2,000 pounds (910 kg), much heavier than the original aircraft, which is believed to have weighed 406 pounds (184 kg). After originally being displayed in the Pittsburg Hot Links Restaurant in downtown Pittsburg, in 2001 it was moved to the city's Northeast Texas Rural Heritage Center and Museum, where it remains on display along with other artifacts related to the craft and to Cannon. One of these artifacts is Cannon's own Bible, which is displayed open to the first chapter of the Book of Ezekiel.

Historians of human flight have generally dismissed claims that the Ezekiel Airship was the first aircraft to successfully make a heavier-than-air flight; some, however, believe that it may have achieved uncontrolled flight.

== See also ==
- Claims to the first powered flight
- The Spaceships of Ezekiel
- Ezekiel 1, Ezekiel 10
