= Ezekiel 11 =

Book of Ezekiel, chapter 11

- ← chapter 10 chapter 12 →
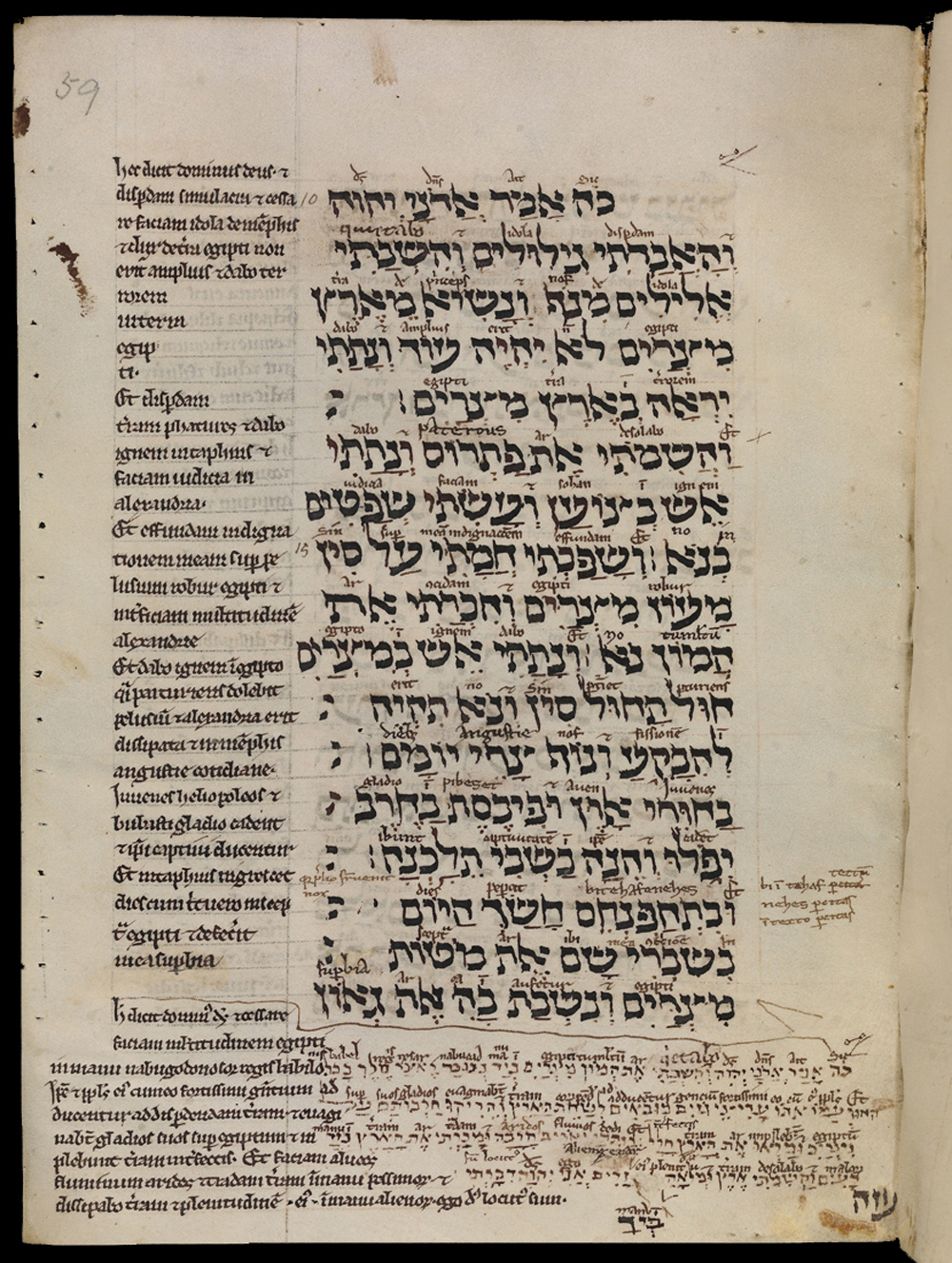
- Book of Ezekiel 30:13–18 in an English manuscript from the early 13th century, MS. Bodl. Or. 62, fol. 59a. A Latin translation appears in the margins with further interlineations above the Hebrew.
- Book: Book of Ezekiel
- Hebrew Bible part: Nevi'im
- Order in the Hebrew part: 7
- Category: Latter Prophets
- Christian Bible part: Old Testament
- Order in the Christian part: 26

Ezekiel 11 is the eleventh chapter of the Book of Ezekiel in the Hebrew Bible or the Old Testament of the Christian Bible. This book contains the prophecies attributed to the prophet/priest Ezekiel, and is one of the Books of the Prophets. In this chapter, Ezekiel pronounces judgment on Jerusalem's "wicked counsellors" and promises that God will restore Israel.

== Text ==
The original text was written in the Hebrew language. This chapter is divided into 25 verses.

=== Textual witnesses ===
Some early manuscripts containing the text of this chapter in Hebrew are of the Masoretic Text tradition, which includes the Codex Cairensis (895), the Petersburg Codex of the Prophets (916), Aleppo Codex (10th century), and Codex Leningradensis (1008). Fragments containing parts of this chapter were found among the Dead Sea Scrolls including 4Q73 (4QEzek^{a}; 50–25 BCE) with extant verses 1–3, 5–11; and 11Q4 (11QEzek; 50 BCE–50 CE) with the extant verse 19.

There is also a translation into Koine Greek known as the Septuagint, made in the last few centuries BC. Extant ancient manuscripts of the Septuagint version include Codex Vaticanus (B; $\mathfrak{G}$^{B}; 4th century), Codex Alexandrinus (A; $\mathfrak{G}$^{A}; 5th century) and Codex Marchalianus (Q; $\mathfrak{G}$^{Q}; 6th century). (Note: Ezekiel is missing from the extant Codex Sinaiticus.)

== Evil in high places (11:1–12) ==
=== Verse 1 ===
Moreover the spirit lifted me up,

and brought me unto the east gate of the Lord's house, which looketh eastward:

and behold at the door of the gate five and twenty men;

among whom I saw Jaazaniah the son of Azur,
and Pelatiah the son of Benaiah, princes of the people.

In his vision, Ezekiel moves from the northern gateway of the temple's inner court (Ezekiel 8:3, 14) to the east gate. The 25 men who are assembled there are "evidently a separate group" from the group of "about twenty-five men" who assembled at the inner court's northern entrance (Ezekiel 8:16), as this group are condemned for their wicked counsel whereas the earlier group are condemned for their sun-worship.

- "Jaazaniah, the son of Azur" is not to be confused with "Jaazaniah, the son of Saphan", mentioned in Ezekiel 8:11. A seal dated to 7th century BC with the name "Jaazaniah" has been found, although the exact identification to which Jaazaniah is difficult.
- "Pelatiah" (Hebrew: פלטיהו pə-laṭ-yā-hū; Greek: Φαλτιας, Φαλεττι(α); Pelatyahu or Pelatyah): means "whom Jehovah delivered". His death, which occurred on hearing Ezekiel's prophecy, is noted in Ezekiel 11:13.

== A promise of restoration (11:13–21) ==
=== Verse 13 ===
Now it happened, while I was prophesying, that Pelatiah the son of Benaiah died. Then I fell on my face and cried with a loud voice, and said, “Ah, Lord God! Will You make a complete end of the remnant of Israel?”

- "While I was prophesying" is interpreted as "as soon as I had finished" in the Easy-to-Read Version.
- "Pelatiah the son of Benaiah": Mentioned in Ezekiel 11:1 as a 'principal man among the twenty-five princes, who made all the mischief in Jerusalem' (cf. Ezekiel 11:2). Although it seems to be a vision at the time (as the slaying of the ancient men in Ezekiel 9:6), but it was a prophecy that would be done in fact, so the prophet thought this as a part of the common destruction on all the inhabitants of the Jerusalem, and he 'earnestly deprecated' that severe judgment (cf. Ezekiel 9:8).

== God’s glory leaves Jerusalem (11:22–24) ==
=== Verse 22 ===
Then did the cherubims lift up their wings, and the wheels beside them; and the glory of the God of Israel was over them above.

- "Cherub" (Hebrew: כרוב kə-rūḇ; plural: Cherubim) is defined in Brown-Driver-Briggs as "the living chariot of the theophanic God". Lutheran theologian Wilhelm Gesenius describes it as "a being of a sublime and celestial nature".

=== Verse 23 ===
And the glory of the LORD went up from the midst of the city,

and stood upon the mountain which is on the east side of the city.

- "Glory" (Hebrew: כבוד kə-ḇōḏ): among other meanings of the Hebrew word, "abundance, riches" or "honour, splendour", which accompanies or surrounds the presence of God (YHWH) as in Exodus 24:16; 1 Kings 8:11; Isaiah 6:3; Ezekiel 1:28, compared to Luke 2:9.
- The "mountain which is on the east side of the city": is interpreted by New Oxford Annotated Bible as "the Mount of Olives".

=== Verse 24 ===
Then the Spirit took me up and brought me in a vision by the Spirit of God into Chaldea, to those in captivity. And the vision that I had seen went up from me.

Some versions refer to Babylonia rather than Chaldea. The International Standard Version explains that at this point, "the vision that I had been observing ended", concluding an account which commenced in chapter 8.

== See also ==
- Cherub
- Jaazaniah the son of Azur
- Jerusalem
- Pelatiah the son of Benaiah
- Judah
- Mercy seat
- Shekinah
- Temple of Solomon
- Related Bible parts: Leviticus 18, Isaiah 6, Ezekiel 1, Luke 2, Romans 12

== Bibliography ==
- Bromiley, Geoffrey W. (1995). International Standard Bible Encyclopedia: vol. iv, Q-Z. Eerdmans. ISBN 9780802837844.
- Brown, Francis; Briggs, Charles A.; Driver, S. R. (1994). The Brown-Driver-Briggs Hebrew and English Lexicon (reprint ed.). Hendrickson Publishers. ISBN 978-1565632066.
- Clements, Ronald E (1996). Ezekiel. Westminster John Knox Press. ISBN 9780664252724.
- Fitzmyer, Joseph A. (2008). A Guide to the Dead Sea Scrolls and Related Literature. Grand Rapids, MI: William B. Eerdmans Publishing Company. ISBN 9780802862419.
- Gesenius, H. W. F. (1979). Gesenius' Hebrew and Chaldee Lexicon to the Old Testament Scriptures: Numerically Coded to Strong's Exhaustive Concordance, with an English Index. Translated by Tregelles, Samuel Prideaux (7th ed.). Baker Book House.
- Joyce, Paul M. (2009). Ezekiel: A Commentary. Continuum. ISBN 9780567483614.
- Ulrich, Eugene, ed. (2010). The Biblical Qumran Scrolls: Transcriptions and Textual Variants. Brill.
- Würthwein, Ernst (1995). The Text of the Old Testament. Translated by Rhodes, Erroll F. Grand Rapids, MI: Wm. B. Eerdmans. ISBN 0-8028-0788-7.
