= Ezekiel 2 =

Book of Ezekiel, chapter 2

- ← chapter 1 chapter 3 →
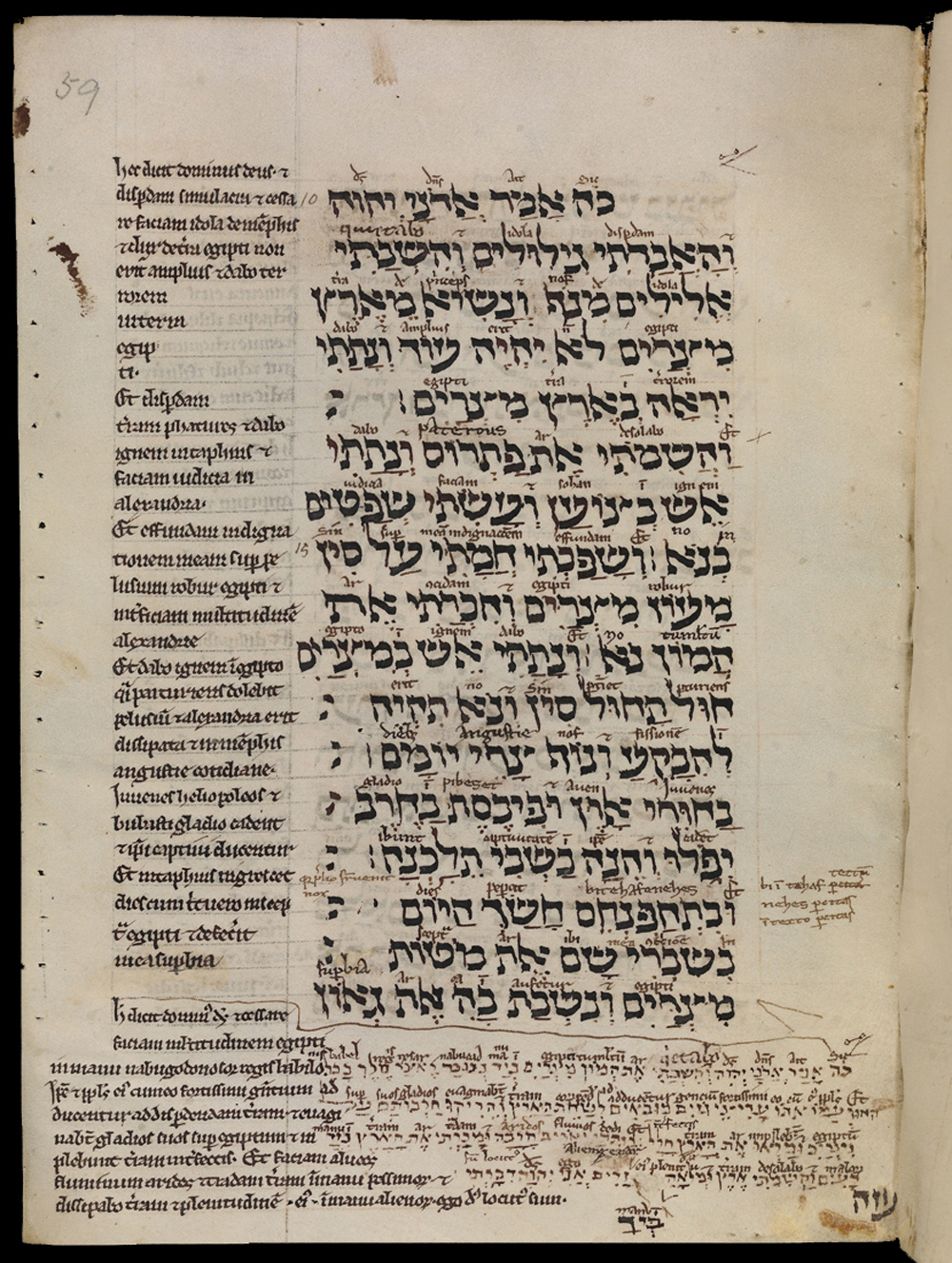
- Book of Ezekiel 30:13–18 in an English manuscript from the early 13th century, MS. Bodl. Or. 62, fol. 59a. A Latin translation appears in the margins with further interlineations above the Hebrew.
- Book: Book of Ezekiel
- Hebrew Bible part: Nevi'im
- Order in the Hebrew part: 7
- Category: Latter Prophets
- Christian Bible part: Old Testament
- Order in the Christian part: 26

Ezekiel 2 is the second chapter of the Book of Ezekiel in the Hebrew Bible or the Old Testament of the Christian Bible. This book contains the prophecies attributed to the prophet/priest Ezekiel and is one of the Book of the Prophets. In this chapter, set within a wider section from Ezekiel 1:28b to Ezekiel 3:15, "Ezekiel receives a commission [from God] to go to the 'rebellious house' of Israel" and to speak for God.

== Text ==
The original text was written in the Hebrew language. This chapter is divided into 10 verses: by count of verses, it is one of the shortest chapters in the Book of Ezekiel.

=== Textual witnesses ===
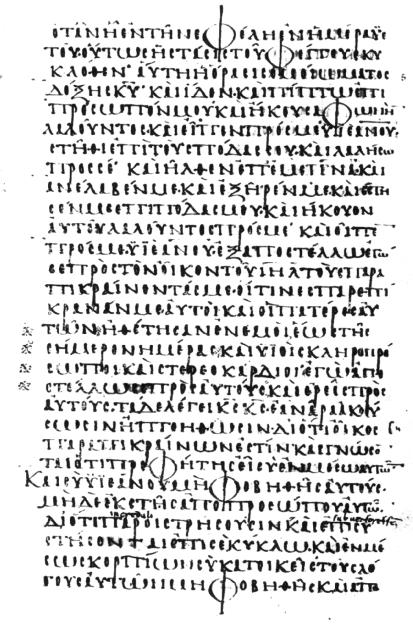
A page containing Ezekiel 1:28-2:6 in Codex Marchalianus (from 6th century CE).

Some early manuscripts containing the text of this chapter in Hebrew are of the Masoretic Text, which includes the Codex Cairensis (895), the Petersburg Codex of the Prophets (916), Aleppo Codex (10th century), Codex Leningradensis (1008).

There is also a translation into Koine Greek known as the Septuagint, made in the last few centuries BC. Extant ancient manuscripts of the Septuagint version include Codex Vaticanus (B; $\mathfrak{G}$^{B}; 4th century), Codex Alexandrinus (A; $\mathfrak{G}$^{A}; 5th century) and Codex Marchalianus (Q; $\mathfrak{G}$^{Q}; 6th century). (Note: Ezekiel is missing from Codex Sinaiticus.)

== Verse 2 ==
Then the Spirit entered me when He spoke to me,
and set me on my feet;
and I heard Him who spoke to me.

- "The Spirit": as "an empowerment" that Ezekiel's revelations and messages are from God. Andrew B. Davidson notes that the Spirit "is not said directly to be the spirit of God, though in a sense this is meant". He suggests that an alternative reading could simply be "spirit entered me".

== Verse 3 ==
And He said to me: "Son of man, I am sending you to the children of Israel, to a rebellious nation that has rebelled against Me; they and their fathers have transgressed against Me to this very day."

Davidson notes that initially, the people to whom Ezekiel is sent are called "the children of Israel", but they are then spoken of as "nations" (goyim, plural: the American Standard Version (1901) speaks of "nations that are rebellious"). This may refer to the two houses of Israel, the north and south, or to "the people [of Israel] as a whole considered as consisting of larger divisions".

== Verse 10 ==
Then He spread it before me;
and there was writing on the inside and on the outside,
and written on it were lamentations and mourning and woe.

- "On the inside and on the outside": unlike the ordinary scrolls which contain writing on only one side, this scroll was described as full of words on both side, dramatizing the fact that the oracle was given to Ezekiel by God. This may indicate a knowledge of Jeremiah's scrolls (Jeremiah 36:1–4).

== See also ==
- Son of man
- Related Bible parts: Jeremiah 1, Ezekiel 1, Ezekiel 3, Zechariah 5, Revelation 5, Revelation 10

== Sources ==
- Carley, Keith W. (1974). The Book of the Prophet Ezekiel. Cambridge Bible Commentaries on the New English Bible (illustrated ed.). Cambridge University Press. ISBN 9780521097550.
- Clements, Ronald E (1996). Ezekiel. Westminster John Knox Press. ISBN 9780664252724.
- Coogan, Michael David (2007). Coogan, Michael David; Brettler, Marc Zvi; Newsom, Carol Ann; Perkins, Pheme (eds.). The New Oxford Annotated Bible with the Apocryphal/Deuterocanonical Books: New Revised Standard Version, Issue 48 (Augmented 3rd ed.). Oxford University Press. ISBN 9780195288810.
- Galambush, J. (2007). "25. Ezekiel". In Barton, John; Muddiman, John (eds.). The Oxford Bible Commentary (first (paperback) ed.). Oxford University Press. pp. 533–562. ISBN 978-0199277186.
- Würthwein, Ernst (1995). The Text of the Old Testament. Translated by Rhodes, Erroll F. Grand Rapids, MI: Wm. B. Eerdmans. ISBN 0-8028-0788-7.
