= Ezekiel 1 =

First Chapter of the Book of Ezekiel in the Hebrew Bible

- ← Lamentations 5 chapter 2 →
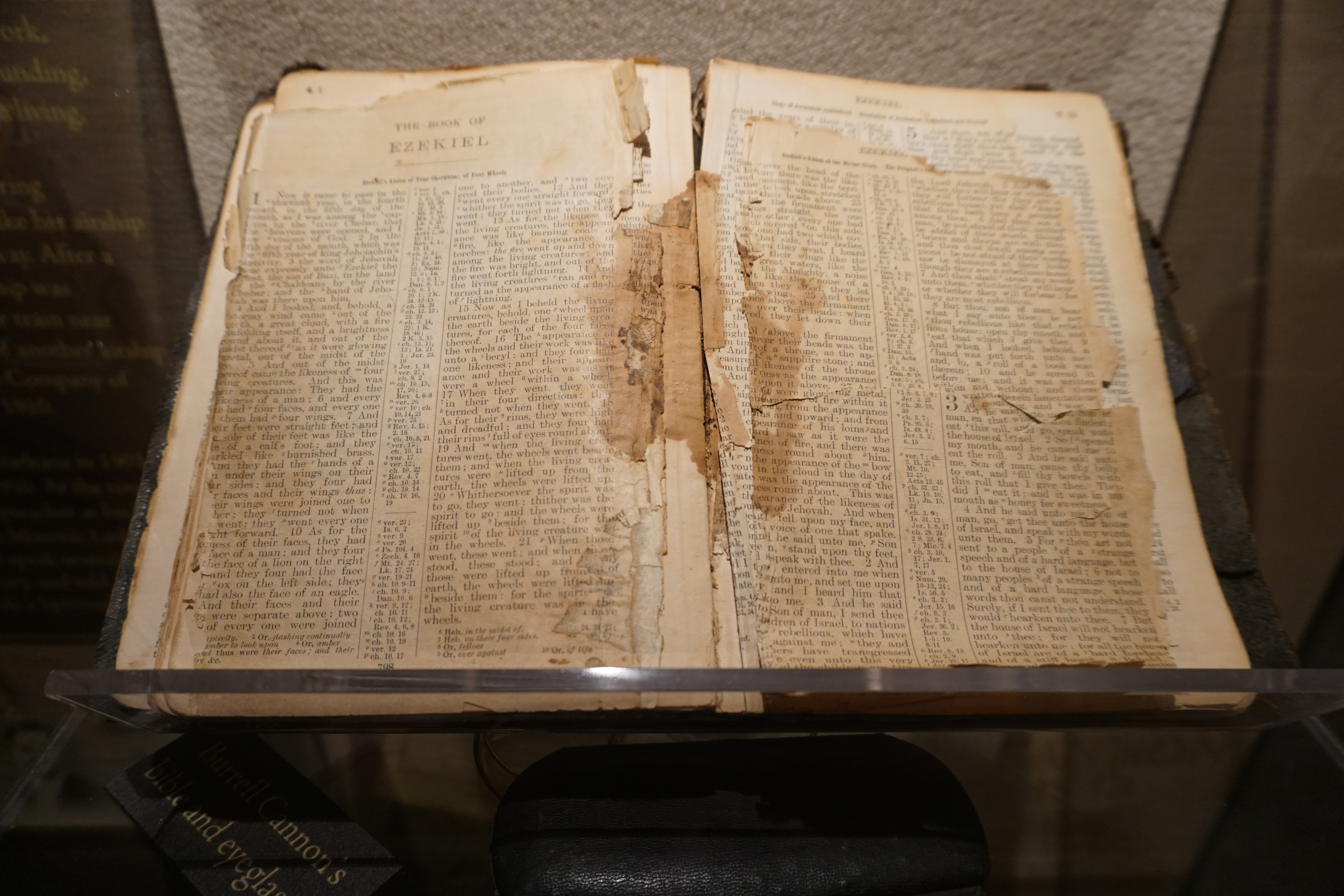
- The Book of Ezekiel on display in the Ezekiel Airship exhibit at the Northeast Texas Rural Heritage Center and Museum in Pittsburg, Texas (United States).
- Book: Book of Ezekiel
- Hebrew Bible part: Nevi'im
- Order in the Hebrew part: 7
- Category: Latter Prophets
- Christian Bible part: Old Testament
- Order in the Christian part: 26

Ezekiel 1 is the first chapter of the Book of Ezekiel in the Tanakh (Hebrew Bible) or the Old Testament of the Christian Bible. This book contains prophecies attributed to the prophet/priest Ezekiel, and is one of the Books of the Prophets. In the New King James Version of the Christian Bible, this chapter is sub-titled "Ezekiel’s Vision of God". In the New International Version of the Christian Bible, the chapter is sub-titled "Ezekiel’s Inaugural Vision". In all versions of the text, the first verse refers to "visions" (plural).

== Text ==
Book of Ezekiel in the Leningrad Codex (1008 CE) from an old facsimile edition.

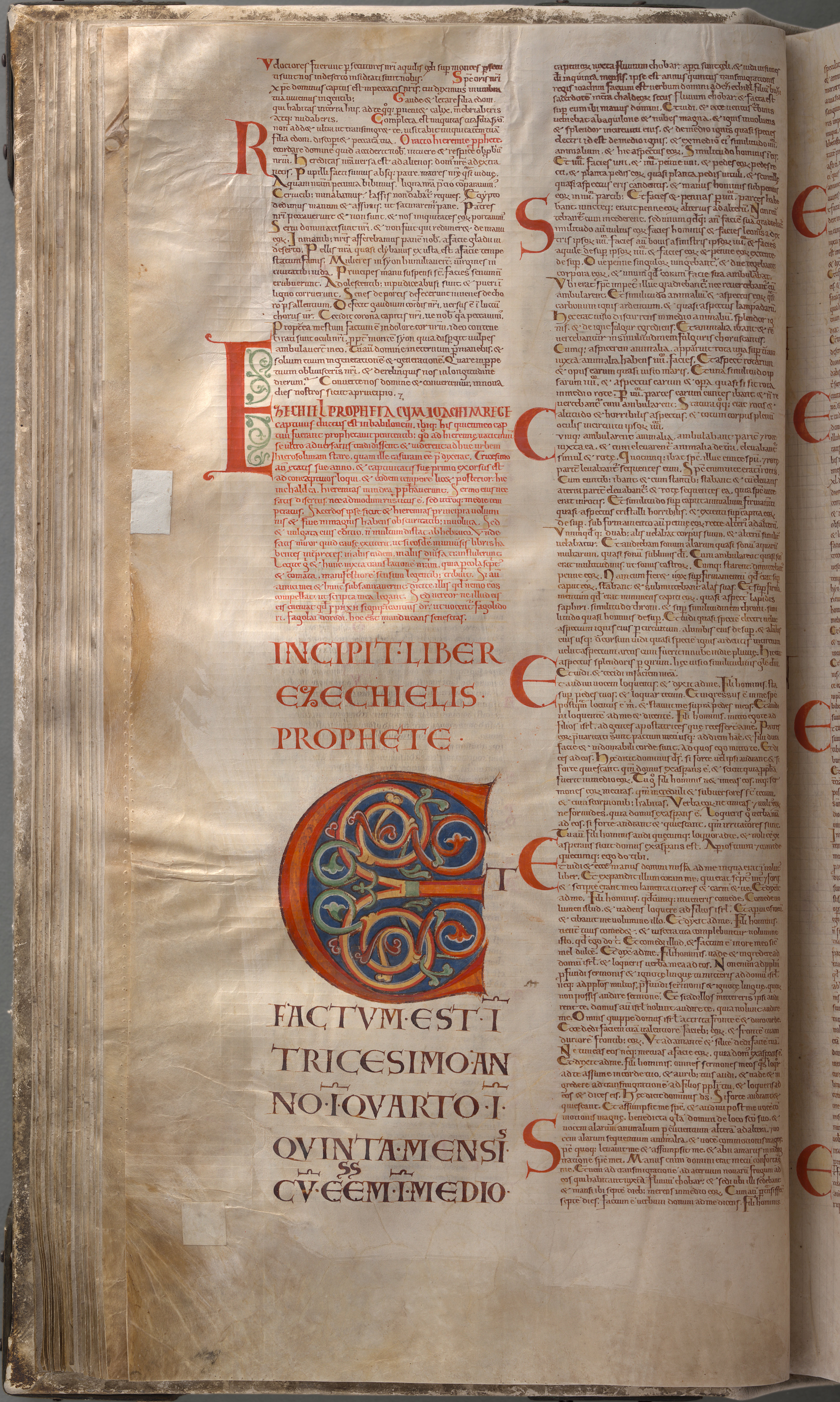
The beginning of the Book of Ezekiel in Latin from Codex Gigas, the largest extant medieval manuscript in the world (from early 13th century).

The original text of this chapter was written in the Hebrew language. This chapter is divided into 28 verses.

=== Textual witnesses ===
Some early manuscripts containing the text of this chapter in Hebrew are of the Masoretic Text tradition, which includes the Codex Cairensis (895), the Petersburg Codex of the Prophets (916), Aleppo Codex (10th century), and Codex Leningradensis (1008). Fragments containing parts of this chapter were found among the Dead Sea Scrolls including 4Q74 (4QEzek^{b}; 50 BCE–50 CE) with extant verses 10–13, 16–17, 19–24; and 11Q4 (11QEzek; 50 BCE–50 CE) with extant verses 8–10.

There is also a translation into Koine Greek known as the Septuagint, made in the last few centuries BCE. Extant ancient manuscripts of the Septuagint version include Codex Vaticanus (B; $\mathfrak{G}$^{B}; 4th century), Codex Alexandrinus (A; $\mathfrak{G}$^{A}; 5th century) and Codex Marchalianus (Q; $\mathfrak{G}$^{Q}; 6th century). (Note: Ezekiel is missing from Codex Sinaiticus.)

== Superscription (1:1–3) ==
Bifolium from a Bible made in 1285. The large initial E on the left page (E[t factum est]) introduces the Book of Ezekiel.

The first three verses form a superscription of the book, containing the identity of the prophet as well as the time and place that the prophecy was received and delivered. There are two distinct introductions: one in the first person (verse 1) and another in the third person (verses 2-3; the only two verses in the book written in the third person).

=== Verse 1 ===
Now it came to pass in the thirtieth year, in the fourth month, in the fifth day of the month, as I was among the captives by the river of Chebar, that the heavens were opened, and I saw visions of God.

The first verse of the book announces that the writer received 'visions of God' while he was among the exiles 'by the river Chebar' in 'the thirtieth year'. The Syriac text refers to "a vision" (singular).

Rashi, a medieval French rabbi, suggests that the thirty years are counted "from the beginning of the jubilee cycle", the last of which was started "at the beginning of the eighteenth year of Josiah's reign; that is, the year that Hilkiah found the scroll" recounted in 2 Kings 22. This view is based on Seder Olam (chapter 26), and also based on Ezekiel 40:1: "In the twenty-fifth year of our exile, at the beginning of the year, on the tenth of the month," which the rabbis said (Arachin 12a) denoted the jubilee year (Leviticus 25:9), and which the prophet uses for his reference of time counting. The date corresponds to July 24, 568 BCE, based on an analysis by German theologian Bernhard Lang.

=== Verse 2 ===
In the fifth day of the month, which was the fifth year of king Jehoiachin's captivity,

- "In the fifth day of the month, which was the fifth year": Rashi wrote that this phrase, this verse and the next are not Ezekiel's words but an added interruption. The date (with unknown month) is calculated to the year 593-592 BCE, based on Lang's analysis, Jehoiachin's captivity having commenced with Nebuchadnezzar's deportation of the exiles after his successful siege of Jerusalem in 597 BCE.

=== Verse 3 ===
The word of the Lord came expressly unto Ezekiel the priest, the son of Buzi,

in the land of the Chaldeans by the river Chebar;

and the hand of the Lord was there upon him.

- "Came expressly" (Hebrew: היה היה): literally "is being", formed by the same word "hayah" twice; the word hayah means to "be", "become", "came to pass", "exist."

== Vision of the throne-chariot (1:4-28) ==
Vision of Ezekiel, from a 15th-century Armenian book

Ezekiel's first vision comes when a stormy wind blew in from the north, bringing with it a shiny cloud that contains 'Yahweh's chariot borne by supernatural creatures'. These "four living creatures" are identified in Ezekiel 10:20 as cherubim.

=== Verse 5 ===
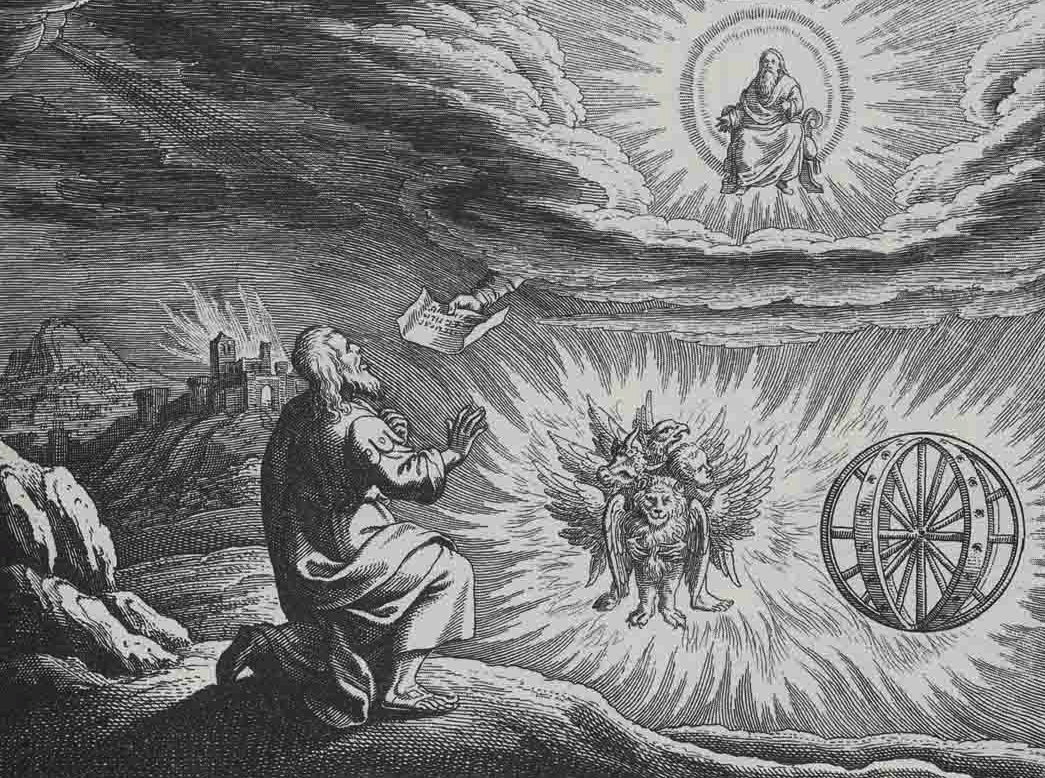
Ezekiel's "chariot vision", by Matthaeus Merian (1593–1650).

Also out of the midst thereof came the likeness of four living creatures.

And this was their appearance; they had the likeness of a man.

- "Living creatures": New Oxford Annotated Bible identified these as "cherubim" (10:15, 20), although "uncharacteristically … [they] have four faces" (Ezekiel 1:10; Revelation 4:7).

=== Verse 10 ===
As for the likeness of their faces, they four had the face of a man, and the face of a lion, on the right side: and they four had the face of an ox on the left side; they four also had the face of an eagle.

With four faces in different directions simultaneously the creatures can move in any direction and also 'guard the blazing substance around which they stand'.

=== Verse 16 ===
The appearance of the wheels and their workings was like the color of beryl, and all four had the same likeness. The appearance of their workings was, as it were, a wheel in the middle of a wheel.

This description (and also in verse 19) becomes the inspiration for the construction of the "Ezekiel Airship".

- "Beryl" or "topaz": some kind of "precious, gold-colored stone".

=== Verse 19 ===
And when the living creatures went, the wheels went beside them; and when the living creatures rose from the earth, the wheels rose.

This description (and also in verse 16) becomes the inspiration for the construction of the "Ezekiel Airship".

=== Verse 26 ===
And above the firmament that was over their heads was the likeness of a throne,

as the appearance of a sapphire stone:

and upon the likeness of the throne was the likeness as the appearance of a man above upon it.

- "Sapphire" (Hebrew: ספיר sapîr): "a kind of gem"; "lapis lazuli" (Ezekiel 28:13). Exodus 24:10 records "a pavement of sapphire" under the feet of God.

=== Verse 27 ===
Also from the appearance of His waist and upward I saw, as it were, the color of amber with the appearance of fire all around within it; and from the appearance of His waist and downward I saw, as it were, the appearance of fire with brightness all around.

Ezekiel saw a human form that shines as if with "fire" (Hebrew: hasmal).

=== Verse 28 ===
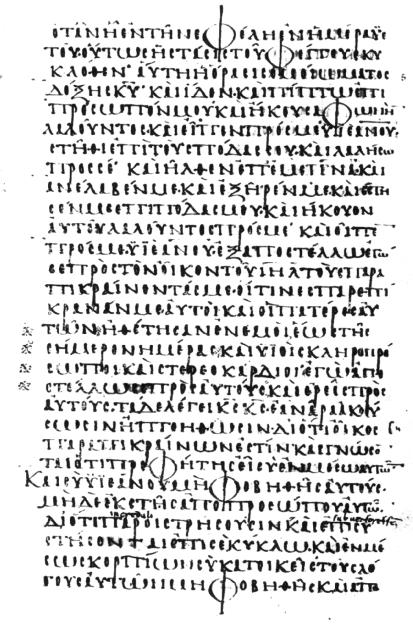
Page with Septuagint text of Ezekiel 1:28-2:6 in Codex Marchalianus, 6th century

As the appearance of the bow that is in the cloud in the day of rain,

so was the appearance of the brightness round about.

This was the appearance of the likeness of the glory of the Lord.
And when I saw it, I fell upon my face,

and I heard a voice of one that spake.

The brightness surrounding the human form in Ezekiel's vision looks like a rainbow, and as soon as he sees it, Ezekiel falls prostrate, because he recognizes it as 'the appearance of the likeness of the glory' of Yahweh. The whole report of the vision uses 'the unmistakable symbols of Yahweh's presence for an Israelite reader'.

== See also ==
- Buzi
- Chebar
- Cherubim
- Jehoiachin, king of Judah
- Living creatures
- Merkabah mysticism
- Throne of God
- Related Bible parts: 2 Kings 24, 2 Chronicles 36, Isaiah 6, Jeremiah 29, Ezekiel 10, Ezekiel 11, John 12, Revelation 4, Revelation 21

== Sources ==
- Brown, Francis; Briggs, Charles A.; Driver, S. R. (1994). The Brown-Driver-Briggs Hebrew and English Lexicon (reprint ed.). Hendrickson Publishers. ISBN 978-1565632066.
- Carley, Keith W. (1974). The Book of the Prophet Ezekiel. Cambridge Bible Commentaries on the New English Bible (illustrated ed.). Cambridge University Press. ISBN 9780521097550.
- Coogan, Michael David (2007). Coogan, Michael David; Brettler, Marc Zvi; Newsom, Carol Ann; Perkins, Pheme (eds.). The New Oxford Annotated Bible with the Apocryphal/Deuterocanonical Books: New Revised Standard Version, Issue 48 (Augmented 3rd ed.). Oxford University Press. ISBN 9780195288810.
- Fitzmyer, Joseph A. (2008). A Guide to the Dead Sea Scrolls and Related Literature. Grand Rapids, MI: William B. Eerdmans Publishing Company. ISBN 9780802862419.
- Galambush, J. (2007). "25. Ezekiel". In Barton, John; Muddiman, John (eds.). The Oxford Bible Commentary (first (paperback) ed.). Oxford University Press. pp. 533–562. ISBN 978-0199277186.
- Gesenius, H. W. F. (1979). Gesenius' Hebrew and Chaldee Lexicon to the Old Testament Scriptures: Numerically Coded to Strong's Exhaustive Concordance, with an English Index. Translated by Tregelles, Samuel Prideaux (7th ed.). Baker Book House.
- Kee, Howard Clark; Meyers, Eric M.; Rogerson, John; Levine, Amy-Jill; Saldarini, Anthony J. (2008). Chilton, Bruce (ed.). The Cambridge Companion to the Bible (2, revised ed.). Cambridge University Press. ISBN 9780521691406.
- Ulrich, Eugene, ed. (2010). The Biblical Qumran Scrolls: Transcriptions and Textual Variants. Brill.
- Würthwein, Ernst (1995). The Text of the Old Testament. Translated by Rhodes, Erroll F. Grand Rapids, MI: Wm. B. Eerdmans. ISBN 0-8028-0788-7.
