= Tel Abib =

Ancient city mentioned in The book of Ezekiel

Tel Abib (Hebrew: תל אביב, romanized: Tel Aviv, "the hill of Spring", from Akkadian Tel Abûbi, "The Tel of the flood") is an unidentified tell ("hill city") on the Kebar Canal, near Nippur in what is now Iraq. Tel Abib is mentioned by Ezekiel in Ezekiel 3:15:

Then I came to them of the captivity at Tel Abib, that lived by the river Chebar, and to where they lived; and I sat there overwhelmed among them seven days.

== Location ==
The Kebar or Chebar Canal (or River) is the setting of several important scenes of the Book of Ezekiel, including the opening verses. The book refers to this river eight times in total.

Some older biblical commentaries identified the Chebar with the Khabur River in what is now Syria. The Khabur is mentioned in 1 Chronicles 5:26 as the "Habor". However, more recent scholarship is agreed that the location of the Kebar Canal is near Nippur in Iraq.

The ka-ba-ru waterway (Akkadian) is mentioned among the 5th century BCE Murashu archives from Nippur. It was part of a complex network of irrigation and transport canals which also included the Shatt el-Nil, a silted up canal toward the east of Babylon.

It is not to be confused with the Kebar River in Iran, site of Kebar Dam, the oldest surviving arch dam.

== Legacy ==
Nahum Sokolow adopted the biblical place-name as the title for his Hebrew translation of Theodor Herzl's 1902 novel Altneuland ("Old New Land"), basing it on archaeologists' use of Arabic "tel" extracted from placenames to mean = "accumulated mound of debris" for "old", and "spring" (season) for "new", "renewal". Menachem Shenkin picked its name to mean a new Jewish village near Jaffa, which grew into the modern Israeli city of Tel Aviv. The Hebrew letter ב without dagesh represents a sound like [v], but older English translations of the Bible traditionally transcribe it as "b".

== See also ==
- Book of Ezekiel
- Tell (archaeology)
- History of Israel
- History of Tel Aviv
