= Ezekiel 10 =

Book of Ezekiel, chapter 10

- ← chapter 9 chapter 11 →
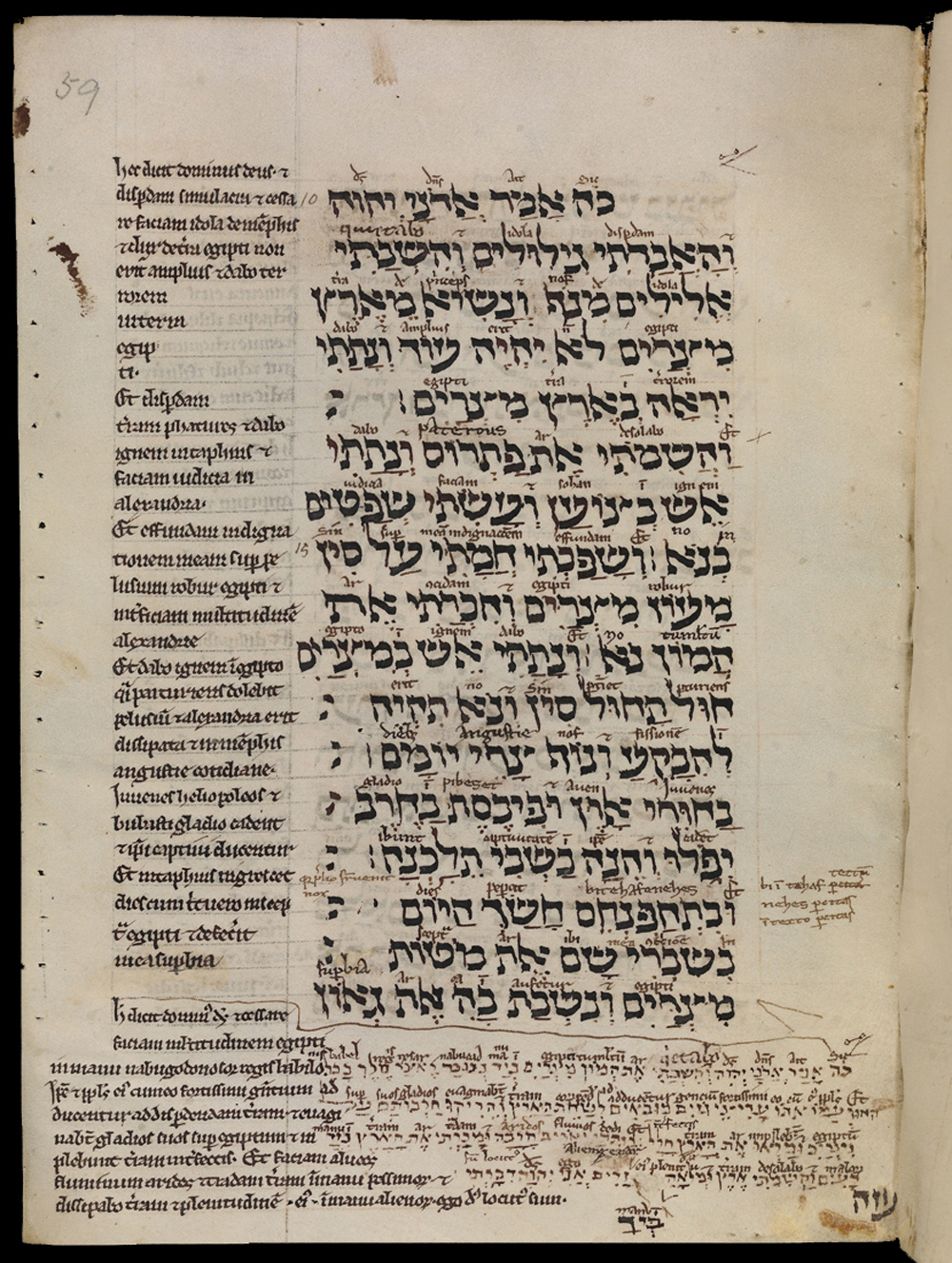
- Book of Ezekiel 30:13–18 in an English manuscript from the early 13th century, MS. Bodl. Or. 62, fol. 59a. A Latin translation appears in the margins with further interlineations above the Hebrew.
- Book: Book of Ezekiel
- Hebrew Bible part: Nevi'im
- Order in the Hebrew part: 7
- Category: Latter Prophets
- Christian Bible part: Old Testament
- Order in the Christian part: 26

Ezekiel 10 is the tenth chapter of the Book of Ezekiel in the Hebrew Bible or the Old Testament of the Christian Bible. This book contains the prophecies attributed to the prophet/priest Ezekiel, and is one of the Books of the Prophets. In this chapter, Ezekiel sees "God's Glory depart from the Temple".

== Text ==
The original text was written in the Hebrew language. This chapter is divided into 22 verses.

=== Textual witnesses ===
Some early manuscripts containing the text of this chapter in Hebrew are of the Masoretic Text tradition, which includes the Codex Cairensis (895), the Petersburg Codex of the Prophets (916), Aleppo Codex (10th century), and Codex Leningradensis (1008). Fragments containing parts of this chapter were found among the Dead Sea Scrolls, that is, 4Q73 (4QEzek^{a}; 50–25 BCE) with extant verses 5–22.

There is also a translation into Koine Greek known as the Septuagint, made in the last few centuries BC. Extant ancient manuscripts of the Septuagint version include Codex Vaticanus (B; $\mathfrak{G}$^{B}; 4th century), Codex Alexandrinus (A; $\mathfrak{G}$^{A}; 5th century) and Codex Marchalianus (Q; $\mathfrak{G}$^{Q}; 6th century). (Note: Ezekiel is missing from the extant Codex Sinaiticus.)

== Verse 1 ==
I looked, and there in the firmament that was above the head of the cherubim, there appeared something like a sapphire stone, having the appearance of the likeness of a throne.

The sapphire stone is said to be like a throne of lapis lazuli in the New International Version.

== Verse 4 ==
Then the glory of the Lord went up from the cherub,

and stood over the threshold of the house;

and the house was filled with the cloud,

and the court was full of the brightness of the Lord's glory.

- "Cherub" (Hebrew: כרוב kə-rūḇ; plural: Cherubim): in Brown-Driver-Briggs is defined as "the living chariot of the theophanic God." Gesenius describes it as "a being of a sublime and celestial nature." Same as in Ezekiel 1:5–14.

== Verse 15 ==
And the cherubims were lifted up.
This is the living creature that I saw by the river of Chebar.

- "Cherub": see notes on Ezekiel 10:4.

== Verse 20 ==
This is the living creature that I saw under the God of Israel by the river of Chebar;

and I knew that they were the cherubims.

- "Living creature": see notes on Ezekiel 10:15.

== Verse 22 ==
And the likeness of their faces was the same as the faces which I had seen by the River Chebar,
their appearance and their persons.
They each went straight forward. (NKJV)

- "River Chebar": is generally identified as the "Kebar Canal", near Nippur in what is now Iraq. It was part of a complex network of irrigation and transport canals which also included the Shatt el-Nil, a silted up canal toward the east of Babylon.

== See also ==
- Ark of the Covenant
- Chebar river
- Cherubim
- Israel
- Jerusalem
- Judah
- Living creatures
- Mercy seat
- Shekhinah
- Related Bible parts: Deuteronomy 31, Ezekiel 1, Hosea 9, 1 Corinthians 14, Hebrews 1, Revelation 2

== Bibliography ==
- Bromiley, Geoffrey W. (1995). International Standard Bible Encyclopedia: vol. iv, Q-Z. Eerdmans. ISBN 9780802837844.
- Clements, Ronald E (1996). Ezekiel. Westminster John Knox Press. ISBN 9780664252724.
- Halperin, David J. (January 1976). "The Exegetical Character of Ezek. X 9-17". Vetus Testamentum. 26 (2). Leiden: Brill Publishers on behalf of the International Organization for the Study of the Old Testament: 129–141. doi:10.1163/156853376X00286. eISSN 1568-5330. ISSN 0042-4935. JSTOR 1517382. S2CID 170312460.
- Joyce, Paul M. (2009). Ezekiel: A Commentary. Continuum. ISBN 9780567483614.
- Ulrich, Eugene, ed. (2010). The Biblical Qumran Scrolls: Transcriptions and Textual Variants. Brill.
- Würthwein, Ernst (1995). The Text of the Old Testament. Translated by Rhodes, Erroll F. Grand Rapids, MI: Wm. B. Eerdmans. ISBN 0-8028-0788-7.
