= Northeast Texas Rural Heritage Center and Museum =

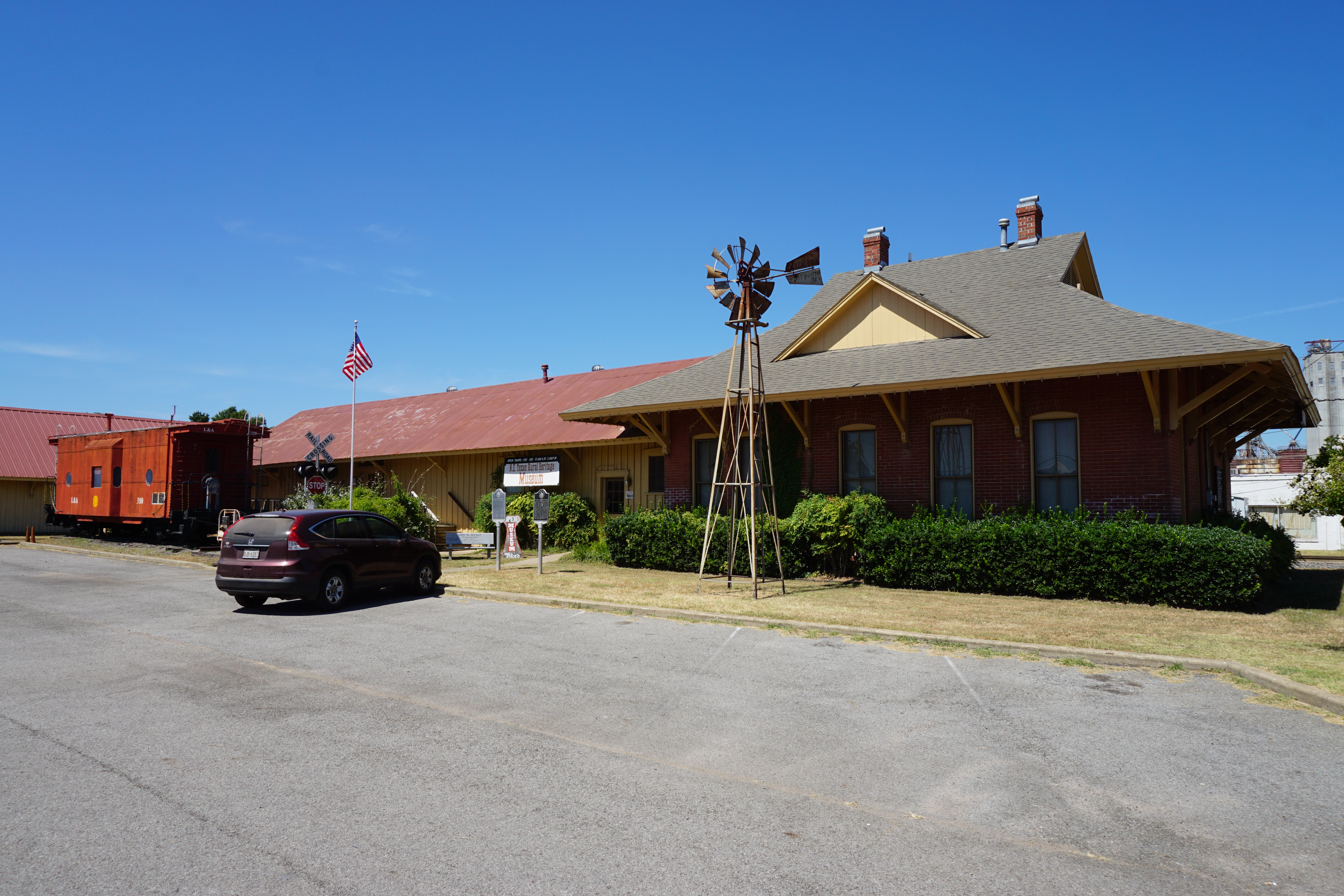
- Exterior of the Depot Museum

- Location within Texas
- Location: Pittsburg, Texas
- Coordinates: 32.995007°N 94.968878°W
- Type: History museum

The Northeast Texas Rural Heritage Center and Museum is a museum in Pittsburg, Texas. It consists of two separate facilities, the Depot Museum and the Farmstead Museum.

The Depot Museum is located in a former Cotton Belt railroad depot that was built in 1901. It includes documents and photographs of local and regional historical interest, including artifacts that date from Pittsburg's foundation in 1854. The museum is also home to a collection of antique farming equipment, a display on prominent local people, an art gallery, a wildlife diorama, and an archaeological exhibit documenting the native Caddo.

The Depot Museum is perhaps best known for its replica of the Ezekiel Airship, which it acquired in 2001. In 1902, a year before the Wright Flyer flew at Kitty Hawk, North Carolina, the Ezekiel Airship was claimed to have flown in Pittsburg. According to these claims, the flight took place in the presence of only a handful of witnesses, and those involved allegedly took an oath of silence; there is no physical evidence to support any of the claims. Historians of human flight have generally dismissed claims that the Ezekiel Airship was the first aircraft to successfully make a heavier-than-air flight; some, however, believe that it may have achieved uncontrolled flight. The full-size replica, based largely on a single surviving photograph, was built by local craftsman Bob Lowery and the Pittsburg Optimist Club in 1986 and 1987. Prior to its acquisition by the museum, the replica was on display at the Pittsburg Hot Links restaurant in downtown Pittsburg.

Other industrial and technological exhibits at the Depot Museum include a 1925 American LaFrance fire truck, a Ford Model T, a surrey built in 1909, an 1890s steam engine, a printing press, a working telegraph station, and a telephone switchboard that dates to 1894.

The Farmstead Museum consists of a restored early 20th-century farmhouse along with a barn and smokehouse. The house is furnished with period furniture, and the farmstead also includes a demonstration garden were cotton and corn are grown. Additionally, the farmstead features exhibits and demonstrations dedicated to period practices relating to work, leisure, childrearing, cooking, and other aspects of rural family life.

== Gallery ==
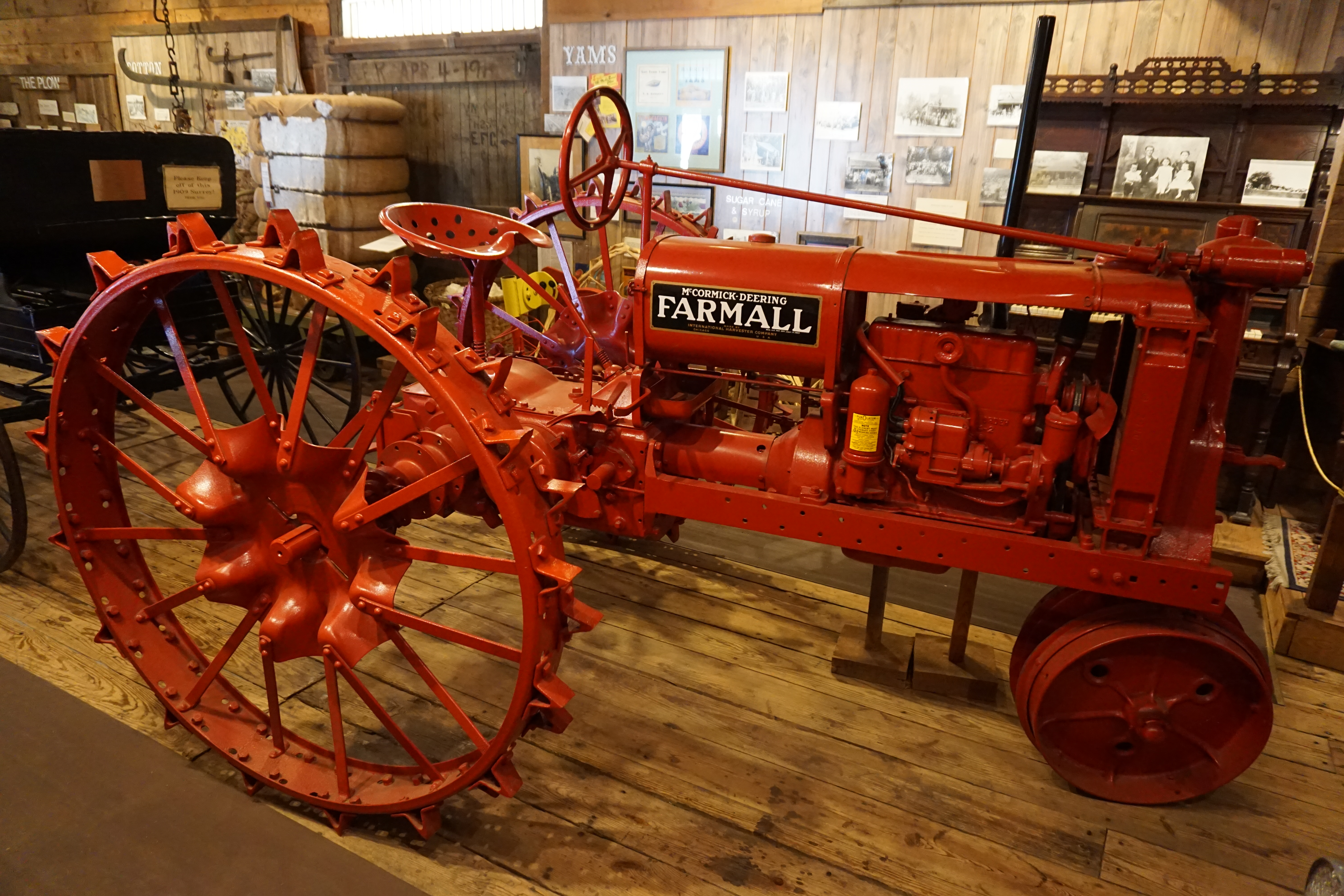
1930s Farmall tractor, at the Depot Museum

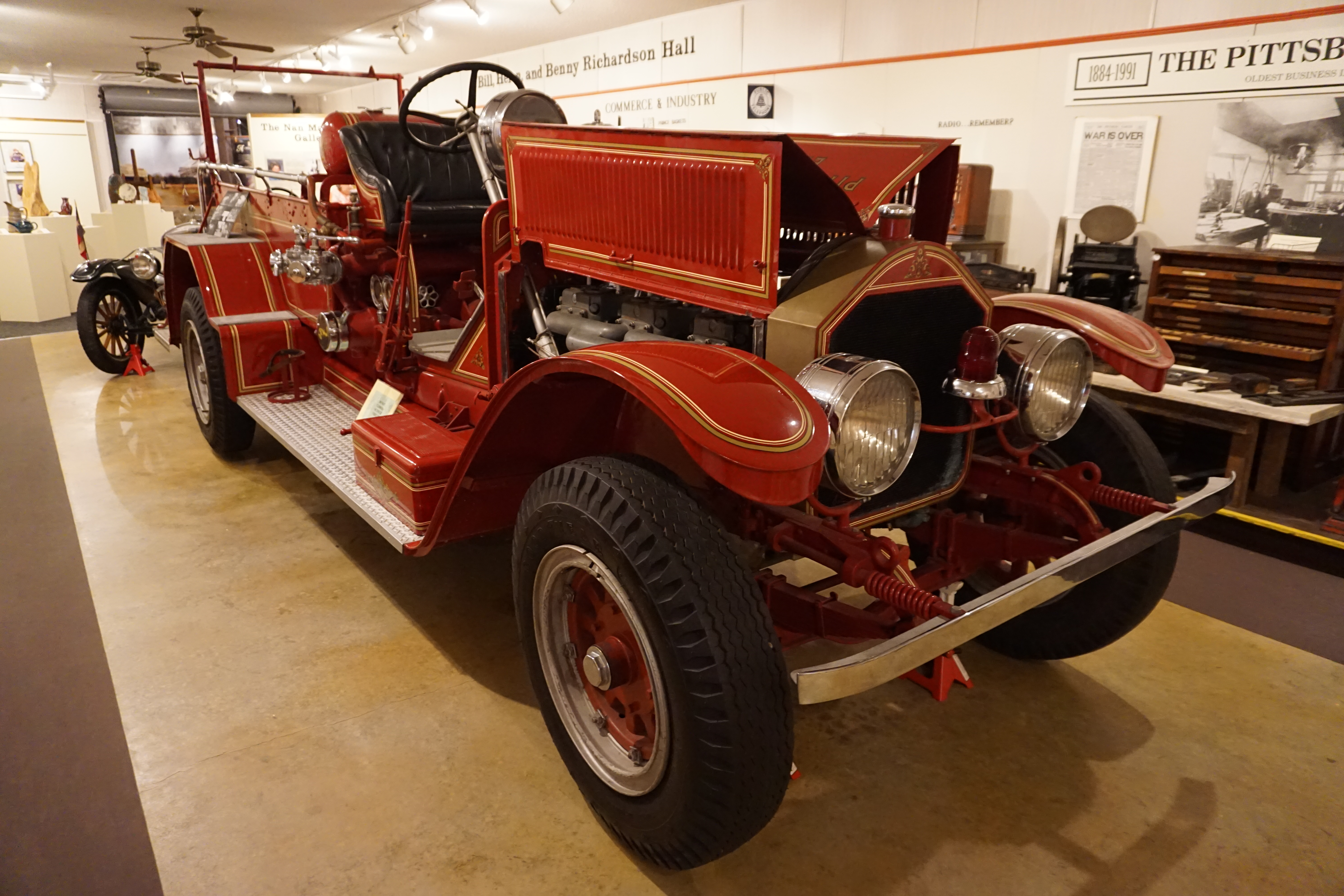
1925 American LaFrance fire truck, at the Depot Museum

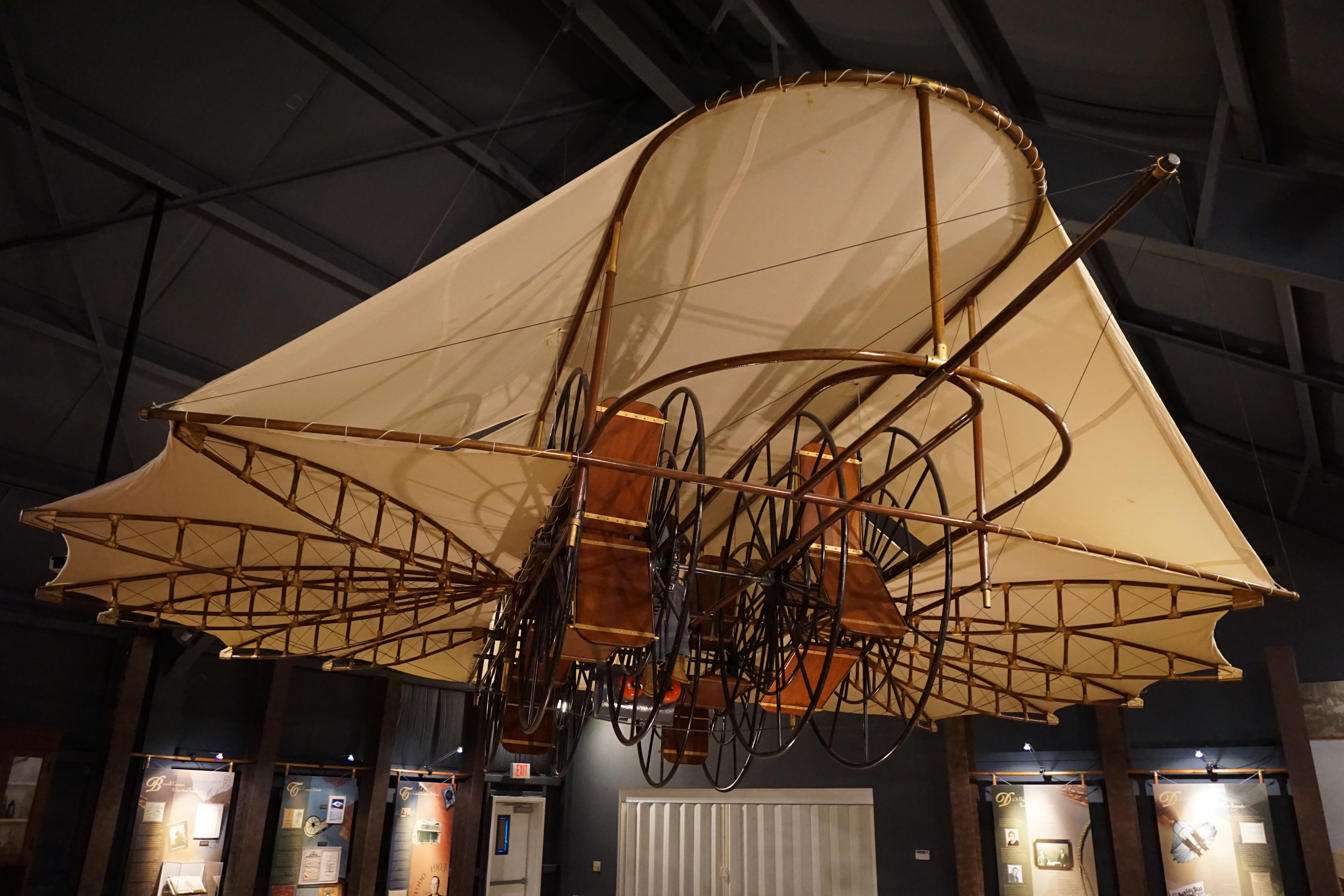
Ezekiel Airship replica, at the Depot Museum

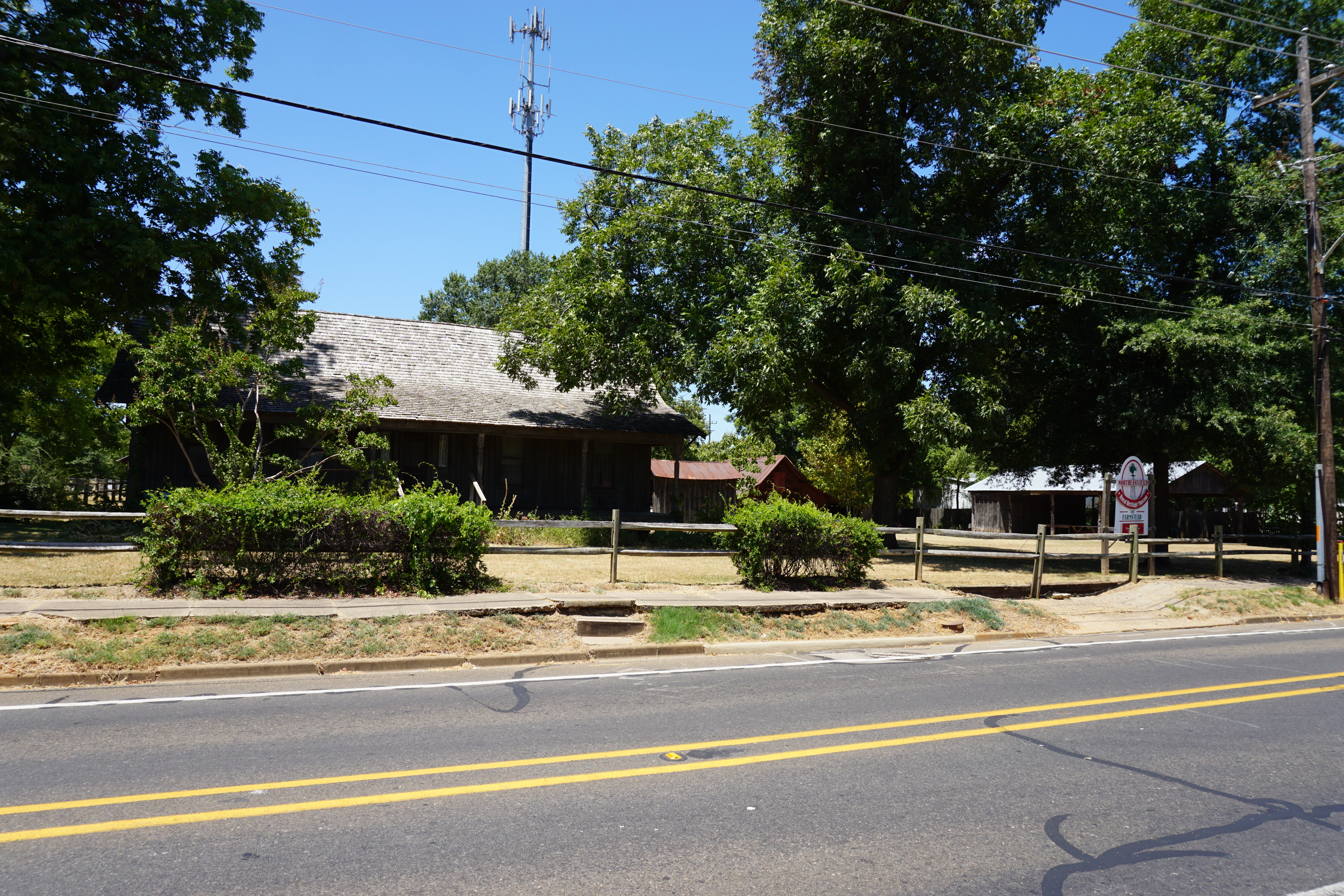
Farmstead Museum
