= Suwwah =

Coptic Christian anchorites in Egypt

Suwwah (Arabic: سواح, plural of Arabic: سائح = traveller, wanderer, itinerant) are Coptic Christian anchorites in Egypt. However, a similar concept is found within Eastern Orthodoxy.

In the Coptic tradition, the suwwah are monks (usually) who have left their monasteries to live a life of complete solitude in the deep desert/wilderness, trusting that God will provide for them. They are considered to have attained the highest level of spirituality. They are also capable of keeping themselves invisible except when they choose to reveal themselves, fleeing from the praise of people. Some hold that there are only ever twelve of them; others believe there are four hundred, and others still hold them to be limitless in number. It is also said that when one of the suwwah dies, the others choose his successor and summon that person to join them.

In a variant form they are described as “Sowha”, monks who dwell in the desert living off the land with aid from no man. They live neither in monasteries nor even caves. Sometimes at night, the singing of psalms by sowha can be heard in the mountain canyons around monasteries. Within the Coptic tradition, there are accounts of church vessels being found unwrapped and already used on the altar before a planned liturgy, despite locked church doors, which is attributed to suwwah having been miraculously transported by God to pray there beforehand.

The sowha are believed to be closer to heaven than earth, making their transition after death to heaven a relatively short one. It would seem they are granted a special grace by which God may be pleased to send them back to earth to complete a mission for the Lord or so that their praise may once more ascend from the deserts of Egypt to heaven to the glory of God. Due to their very limited reported interactions with people, much mystery surrounds them.
