= Joachim Jeremias =

German Lutheran theologian (1900–1979)

- Born: 20 September 1900; Dresden
- Died: 6 September 1979 (aged 78); Tübingen
- Occupations: Lutheran theologian, scholar of Near Eastern Studies
- Title: Professor of New Testament studies at the Georg-August University of Göttingen

Academic background
- Education: Universities of Tübingen & Leipzig

Joachim Jeremias (20 September 1900 – 6 September 1979) was a German Lutheran theologian, scholar of Near Eastern Studies and university professor for New Testament studies. He was abbot of Bursfelde, 1968–1971.

He was born in Dresden and spent his formative years in Jerusalem, where between 1910 and 1918 his father, Friedrich Jeremias (1868–1945), worked as Provost of the Lutheran Church of the Redeemer. He studied Lutheran theology and Oriental languages at the universities of Tübingen and Leipzig. In Leipzig he obtained both a "Doctor philosophiae (Dr.phil.)" (1922) and a "Doctor theologiae (Dr.theol.)" (1923) degree (Ph.D. and Th.D. in English), followed by his Habilitation (1925). His mentor was the renowned Gustaf Dalman.

After other teaching assignments, Jeremias was appointed in 1935 to the chair of New Testament studies at the Georg-August University of Göttingen, where he taught until his retirement in 1968. In 1976, Jeremias moved from Göttingen to Tübingen, where he died in 1979.

== Academic work ==
His research and publications covered a wide field, ranging from historical and archaeological to literary and philosophical studies. They concentrate on the Hebrew Bible and Rabbinic texts relevant for a critical analysis of the New Testament in order to reconstruct the historical environment of Jesus in all its complexity, to provide a deeper understanding of his life and teachings.

His achievements found national and international acknowledgment, recognized by the admission into the Göttingen Academy of Sciences in 1948 and the award of honorary doctorates from the universities of Leipzig, St Andrews (Britain), Uppsala (Sweden), and Oxford (Britain). He became a foreign member of the Royal Netherlands Academy of Arts and Sciences in 1958. He was elected a corresponding fellow of the British Academy in 1973. Finally, in 1970 he was made an honorary fellow of the Deutsche Verein zur Erforschung Palästinas (German association for research on Palestine).

=== Jeremias on the New Testament Apocrypha ===
He worked with Wilhelm Schneemelcher in revisions of the Hennecke-Schneemelcher collection of New Testament Apocrypha.

=== Jeremias on Jesus in the Talmud ===
Jeremias took a stand on the passages generally regarded as relating to Jesus in the Talmud which supported medieval rabbinical defences that the Yeshu the deceiver mentioned in the Talmud was a different Jesus from the Jesus of Christianity. Related to this he also supported David Flusser's suggestion that the name Yeshu itself was in no way abusive, but 'almost certainly' a Galilean dialect form of Yeshua. Jeremias himself recounted in 1966 that he had discovered the only known confirmed inscription of the spelling Yeshu in Bethesda, but that this inscription was now covered.

== Legacy ==
Jeremias's work on the New Testament was renowned globally, and a symposium was held at the 40th anniversary of his death at the University of Gottingen in 2019. Martin Hengel dedicated The Atonement: The Origins of the Doctrine in the New Testament to Jeremias, praising him as the most important German New Testament scholar of his generation.

== Publications in English ==
- Jeremias, Joachim; Zimmerli, Walther (1957). The Servant of God (trans. of Pais Theou). Studies in Biblical Theology. Vol. 20. Naperville, IL: A. R. Allenson. OCLC 925524. - (orig. German in Kittel, Stuttgart, 1952)
- Jeremias, Joachim; Zimmerli, Walther (1958). Jesus' Promise to the Nations (trans. of Jesu Verheissung für die Volker). Studies in Biblical Theology. Vol. 24. Naperville, IL: A. R. Allenson. OCLC 357876. - (orig. German pub. by Stuttgart: Kohlhammer Verlag, 1956)
- Infant Baptism in the First Four Centuries, trans. D. Cairns (1962; reprinted, 2004; German ed.: 1958)
- The Sermon on the Mount, trans. Norman Perrin (1963; German ed.: 1959)
- The Lord's Prayer, trans. John Reumann (1964; German ed.: 1962)
- The Key to Pauline Theology (October 1, 1964. The Expository Times; Volume: 76 issue: 1, page(s): 27-30)
- The Problem of the Historical Jesus, trans. Norman Perrin (1964; German ed.: 1960)
- Unknown Sayings of Jesus, trans. Reginald H. Fuller (1964; German ed.: 1949)
- The Central Message of the New Testament (1965; reprinted, 1981)
- The Eucharistic Words of Jesus, trans. Norman Perrin (1966; reprinted, 1977; 3d German ed.: 1960)
- Rediscovering the Parables of Jesus (1966; abridgement of The Parables of Jesus)
- The Rediscovery of Bethesda, John 5:2 (1966; German ed.: 1949)
- The Prayers of Jesus, trans. John Bowden et al. (1967; German ed.: 1958)
- Jerusalem in the Time of Jesus: An Investigation into Economic & Social Conditions During the New Testament Period, trans. F. H. Cave and C. H. Cave (1969; German ed.: 1967)
- New Testament Theology, trans. John Bowden (1971; German ed.: 1971)
- The Origins of Infant Baptism: A Further Reply to Kurt Aland, trans. Dorothea M. Barton (1971; German ed.: 1962)
- The Parables of Jesus, 2d ed., trans. S. H. Hooke (1972; German ed.: 1958)
- Jesus and the Message of the New Testament, edited by K. C. Hanson, Fortress Classics in Biblical Studies (2002)
- The Theological Significance of the Dead Sea Scrolls, trans. D.J. Zersen (1975; German ed.: 1962)
- "The 'Pinnacle' of the Temple (Matt. 4:5; Luke 4:9)," WholeStones.org
