= Jutta Jokiranta =

Finnish theologian (born 1971)

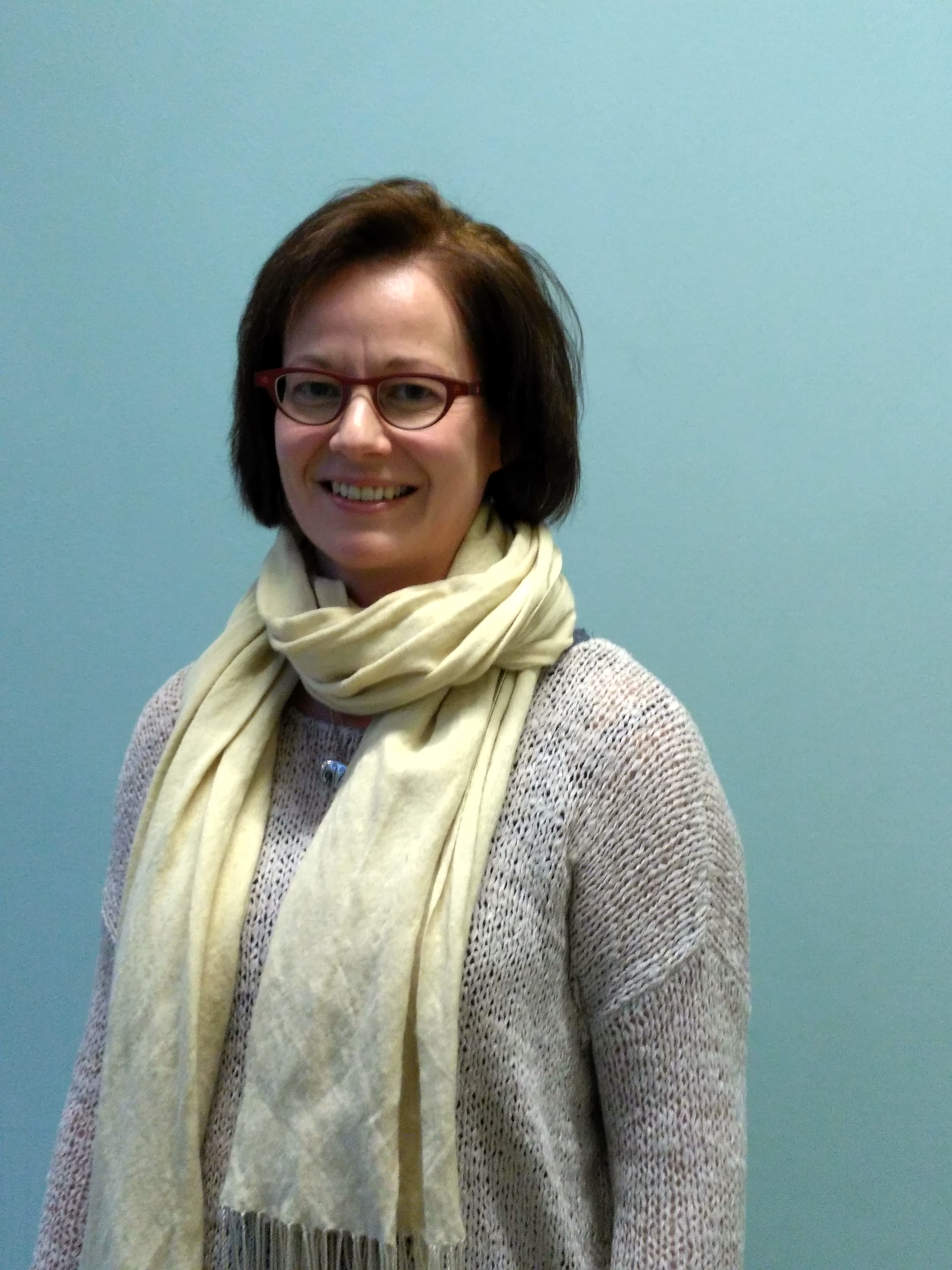
- Born: 14 April 1971 (age 54); Salla, Finland
- Scientific career
- Fields: Dead Sea Scrolls, Second Temple Judaism
- Doctoral advisor: Raija Sollamo

Jutta Maria Jokiranta (née Miettinen; born 14 April 1971 in Salla) is a Finnish theologian and, since 2018, a professor in Hebrew Bible and cognate studies at the University of Helsinki. She is a former university lecturer of the Hebrew Bible at the University of Helsinki and an Academy Research Fellow of the Academy of Finland. Her area of specialization is Qumran studies and Second Temple Judaism. She is currently leader of the team in "Society and Religion in Late Second Temple Judaism" in the Academy of Finland Centre of Excellence in "Changes in Sacred Texts and Traditions" (2014–2019, directed by Martti Nissinen). She was elected president of the International Organization for Qumran Studies (IOQS) at their July 2016 meeting in Leuven.

== Books ==
- Jokiranta, Jutta (2013). Social Identity and Sectarianism in the Qumran Movement. Leiden: Brill: ISBN 9789004238619.
- Hakola, Raimo; Jokiranta, Jutta Maria; Huebenthal, Sandra; Byrskog, Samuel (2016). Social Memory and Social Identity in the Study of Early Judaism and Early Christianity. Vandenhoeck & Ruprecht. ISBN 9783525593752. OCLC 960165325.
