= André Caquot =

French professor (1923–2004)

- Born: André, Marcel Caquot; 24 April 1923; Épinal
- Died: 1 September 2004 (aged 81); Paris
- Occupation: Orientalist

André Caquot (French: [ɑ̃dʁe kako]; 24 April 1923 – 1 September 2004) was a French orientalist, specialized in Semitic history and civilisations and professor of Hebrew and Aramaic language at the Collège de France. In 1986, André Caquot was elected president of the Académie des Inscriptions et Belles-Lettres. His work particularly focused on the Dead Sea Scrolls, Ugaritic and Phoenician sculptures, as well as on ancient Ethiopia.

== Career ==
A former student of the École Normale Supérieure in Paris, agrégé de grammaire, André Caquot joined the French Archaeological Mission in Ethiopia from 1953 to 1955 before being appointed director of the Semitic religions comparative studies at the École pratique des hautes études then lecturer in History of Religions at the Faculty of Protestant Theology in Strasbourg.

From 1964 to 1968, he was responsible for Hebrew lessons and history of the religion of Israel at the Sorbonne, then from 1972 to 1994, he occupied the chair of Hebrew and Aramaic at the Collège de France. Elected a member of the Académie des inscriptions et belles-lettres in 1977, he became president of the institution in 1986. In 1992, he was president of the 14th congress of the International Organisation for the Study of the Old Testament.

Having retired in 1992, André Caquot was invited, until 2003, to give conferences and seminars to the Faculty of Theology of Angers of the Catholic University of the West where his library and archives are now housed.

He contributed to the translation of the Psalms and the Books of Samuel for the Traduction œcuménique de la Bible.

President of the Société Asiatique and of the Société des études juives, André Caquot was also general secretary of the "Société française d'histoire des religions".

== Bibliography ==
- Philipe de Robert, « André Caquot », in Patrick Cabanel and André Encrevé (dir.), Dictionnaire biographique des protestants français de 1787 à nos jours, tome 1 : A-C, Les Éditions de Paris Max Chaleil, Paris, 2015, (p. 562–563) ISBN 978-2846211901
