= Vetus Testamentum =

- Discipline: Old Testament
- Language: English, French, German
- Edited by: Annette Schellenberg

Publication details
- History: 1951-present
- Publisher: Brill Publishers on behalf of the International Organization for the Study of the Old Testament
- Frequency: Quarterly

Standard abbreviations
- ISO 4: Vetus Testam.

Indexing
- ISSN: 0042-4935 (print); 1568-5330 (web)
- LCCN: 56003071
- OCLC no.: 46606373

Links
- Journal homepage

Vetus Testamentum is a quarterly academic journal covering various aspects of the Old Testament. It is published by Brill Publishers for its sponsor, the International Organisation for the Study of the Old Testament. It is a major Old Testament scholarly journal.
