= Glory of God =

Manifestation of God's presence

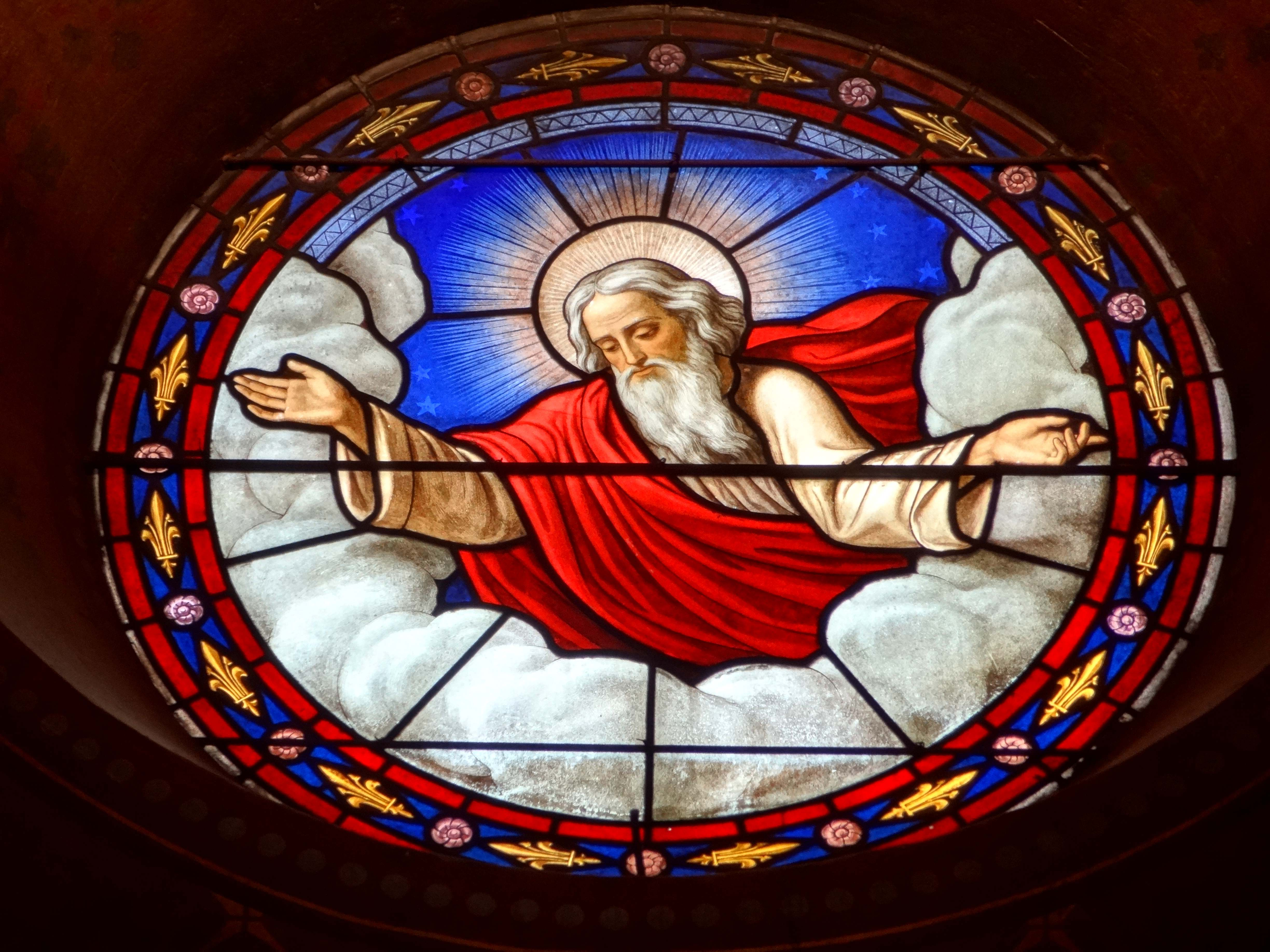
God depicted in stained glass at the Notre-Dame-de-l'Assomption in Paris

In the Abrahamic religions, glory (Latin: gloria 'fame, renown') describes the manifestation of God's presence as perceived by humans. Divine glory is an important motif throughout Christian theology, where God is regarded as the most glorious being in existence, and it is considered that human beings are created in the image of God and can share or participate, albeit imperfectly, in divine glory as image-bearers. Thus Christians are instructed to "let your light shine before men, that they may see your good works, and glorify your Father in heaven".

== Etymology ==
"Glory" is one of the most common praise words in scripture. In the Hebrew Bible, the concept of glory is expressed with several Hebrew words, including Hod (Hebrew: הוד) and kavod (כָּבוֹד). Later, these original Hebrew Bible concepts for glory were translated in the Christian Testament as the Greek word doxa (Ancient Greek: δόξα). The Hebrew word kavod (K-V-D) has meant 'importance, weight, deference, heaviness', but primarily kavod means 'glory, respect, honor, majesty'. In translating the Hebrew Bible, the Greek word used is doxa, a word also appearing extensively in the New Testament which was originally written in Greek. Doxa means 'judgment' or 'opinion', and by extension, 'good reputation, honor'. Augustine of Hippo later rendered it as clara notitia cum laude ('brilliant celebrity with praise').

== In Judaism ==
In Exodus 33:18–20, Moses is told that no human being can see the glory (כָּבוֹד, kavod) of Yahweh and survive:

And the Lord said to Moses, "This very thing that you have spoken I will do, for you have found favor in my sight, and I know you by name." Moses said, "Please show me your glory." And he said, "I will make all my goodness pass before you and will proclaim before you my name 'the Lord'. And I will be gracious to whom I will be gracious, and will show mercy on whom I will show mercy." But, he said, "you cannot see my face, for man shall not see me and live." And the Lord said, "Behold, there is a place by me where you shall stand on the rock, and while my glory passes by I will put you in a cleft of the rock, and I will cover you with my hand until I have passed by. Then I will take away my hand, and you shall see my back, but my face shall not be seen."

The prophet Ezekiel writes in his vision:

And upward from what had the appearance of his waist I saw as it were gleaming metal, like the appearance of fire enclosed all around. And downward from what had the appearance of his waist I saw as it were the appearance of fire, and there was brightness around him. Like the appearance of the bow that is in the cloud on the day of rain, so was the appearance of the brightness all around.

Such was the appearance of the likeness of the glory of the Lord. And when I saw it, I fell on my face, and I heard the voice of one speaking.

== In Christianity ==
In the New Testament, the corresponding word is the Greek term δοξα (doxa), sometimes also translated 'brightness'. For example, at the nativity of Christ:

In the countryside close by there were shepherds out in the fields keeping guard over their sheep during the watches of the night. An angel of the Lord stood over them and the glory of the Lord shone round them. They were terrified, but the angel said, 'Do not be afraid. Look, I bring you news of great joy, a joy to be shared by the whole people.'

In the event known as the Transfiguration of Jesus, Moses and Elijah appeared in glory with Jesus, and the disciples who witnessed this revelation, Peter, James and John, 'saw His glory'.

In the gospel of John, Jesus says that His destiny begins to be fulfilled when Judas Iscariot sets out to betray Him:

Now the Son of Man is glorified, and God is glorified in Him.

Jesus subsequently addresses a long prayer to His Father in which he says:

I have glorified You on earth by finishing the work that You gave me to do. Now, Father, glorify me with that glory I had with You before ever the world existed.

=== In Catholicism ===
Catholic doctrine asserts that the world was created as an act of God's free will for his own glory. Catholic doctrine teaches, however, that God does not seek to be glorified for his own sake, but for the sake of mankind that they may know Him.

=== In Reformed Christianity ===
In his dissertation "Concerning the End for which God Created the World", " Congregationalist minister Jonathan Edwards concludes, "[I]t appears that all that is ever spoken of in the Scripture as an ultimate end of God's works is included in that one phrase, 'the glory of God'."

There are two events that occur during glorification, these are "the receiving of perfection by the elect before entering into the kingdom of heaven," and "the receiving of the resurrection bodies by the elect"

Glorification is the third stage of Christian development. The first being justification, then sanctification, and finally glorification. (Rom. 8:28-30) Glorification is the full realization of salvation.

Glorification is the Reformed alternative to the Catholic purgatory, as it is "the means by which the elect receive perfection before entering into the kingdom of Heaven." Purgatory deals with the means by which the elect become perfect (by suffering physically and emotionally, people are believed to earn their way into heaven) and takes place after physical death; glorification deals with the elect becoming perfect and is a supernatural, ongoing process which takes place during life through the work of the Holy Spirit after people trust in Jesus for their eternal life.

After the final judgment, in some doctrines, all the righteous dead will arise and their bodies will be perfected and become glorified bodies, under which form they will live forever under God's new Heaven on God's New Earth, as described in Revelation, Chapter 21.

=== In Anglicanism ===
The theologian C. S. Lewis, in his essay The Weight of Glory, writes "Glory suggests two ideas to me, of which one seems wicked and the other ridiculous. Either glory means to me fame, or it means luminosity." He concludes that glory should be understood in the former sense, but states that one should not desire fame before men (human glory), but fame before God (divine glory). Where fame is understood as "not (fame) conferred by our fellow creatures—(but, rather) fame with God, approval or (I might say) 'appreciation' by God. And then, when I had thought it over, I saw that this view was scriptural; nothing can eliminate from the parable the divine accolade, 'Well done, thou good and faithful servant.'"

=== In Orthodox Christianity ===
Glorification (also referred to as canonization) is the term used in the Orthodox Christian Church for the official recognition of a person as a saint of the Church. The Orthodox Christian term theosis is roughly equivalent to the Protestant concept of glorification.

It is in this sense that the resurrected bodies of the righteous will be "glorified" at the Second Coming. As the soul was illuminated through theosis so the restored body will be illuminated by the grace of God when it is "changed" at the Parousia (1 Corinthians 15:51). This glorified body will be like the resurrected body of Jesus (John 20:19–20); similar in appearance to the body during life, but of a more refined and spiritualized nature (1 Corinthians 15:39).

== In the Baháʼí Faith ==
The Baháʼí Faith claims that Baha'u'llah, whose name translates to the Glory of God, is the Messenger of God promised to man by all the older Abrahamic religions, like Christianity, Judaism and Islam. In Baháʼí belief the Greatest Name is Baháʼ (بهاء), translated as "glory" or "splendour."

== In Islam ==
In Islamic belief, God has 99 names, and in some Islamic traditions it is believed that there is a special hidden 100th name which is the greatest.

To glorify God in Islam is one of the four eternal good deeds. Glorifying God (Tasbih, Arabic: تسبيح) is mentioned in many verses in the Quran. For example "The seven heavens and the earth and all beings therein glorify God. There is not a single thing that does not glorify God with praise, but you do not understand their glorification. God is truly clement and forgiving" [Quran 17:44]. The Islamic prophet Muhammad said the eternal good deeds (Arabic: الباقيات الصالحات) are to glorify God (Tasbihتسبيح), to praise God (Hamed. حمد), to unify God (Tawhid, توحيد) and to elevate God (Takbir, تكبير). These are eternal good deeds due to their devotional and spiritual meanings as the Muslims understand them. For example, you glorify God because God is impeccable and you are in God's wonderful kingdom; you praise God because God is sustaining, ruling and loving you and everyone; you unify God because only God exists and nothing exists beside God; you elevate God so that nothing would remain or be elevated in your heart beside God. Muhammad said "To glorify God, to praise God, to unify God and to elevate God is more pleasing to my heart than everything under the sun." The Quran says "wealth and children are the gloss of the worldly life, while the eternal good deeds are better" [18:46]. It is a common act of devotion for Muslims to glorify God (33 times), praise God (33 times) and elevate God (33/34 times) after each of the five daily regular prayers following the hadith saying of Muhammad.

Glorification in Islam has many layers of meanings that varies according to one's spiritual state and circumstances. Yet all these meanings generally imply viewing God as impeccable and the feeling of wonderment for being in such glorious existence. Among these meanings for example are:

1. To glorify God is to have wonderment and integration with the universe, as a child is experiencing a universe that is singing with the child: "We did indeed bestow on David favor from Us: O mountains, and birds, sing the glory of God along with him. and we softened iron for him" [Quran 34:10].
2. To glorify God is to have the heart that stands in wonderment seeing that for God everything is possible through means or without means: "Glory to Him who journeyed His devotee by night, from the Sacred Mosque to the Farthest Mosque, whose precincts We blessed, so We might show him some of Our wonders. For He is the all-hearing, the all-seeing" [Quran 17:1].
3. To glorify God is to view God as impeccable; that is to cleanse bad thoughts that you have about God: "Then the whale swallowed him, and he was blameworthy. If not for the fact that he was one who glorified God, he would have remained inside its guts until the day they are resurrected" [Quran 37:142-144].
4. To glorify God is to free one's mind from constrained conceptions that you have about God without knowledge: "Yet they considered sprites partners to God, though God created them; and they falsely attribute sons and daughters to God, without knowledge. Glory be to God, exalted beyond what they describe" [Quran 6:100].

These are just few meanings, yet the glorification of God (Tasbih) is mentioned in more than 90 verses in the Quran and in many hadith sayings of Muhammad.

== Comparison with human glory ==
In comparison to the desire for glory from God, stands the desire for glory from man. Thomas Aquinas, in his Summa Theologica, cautions that an inordinate desire of glory, or praise, from man is a sin. He lists vainglory as a capital vice and, in some cases, as a mortal sin, cf. quotation. However, this is not to be confused with the desire for what Aquinas calls honours, which Aquinas considered a good, and embraces a moderate and reasoned pursuance of.

As stated above (24, 12; 110, 4; 112, 2), a sin is mortal through being contrary to charity. Now the sin of vainglory, considered in itself, does not seem to be contrary to charity as regards the love of one's neighbor: yet as regards the love of God it may be contrary to charity in two ways. On one way, by reason of the matter about which one glories: for instance when one glories in something false that is opposed to the reverence we owe God, according to Ezekiel 28:2, "Thy heart is lifted up, and Thou hast said: I am God," and 1 Corinthians 4:7, "What hast thou that thou hast not received? And if thou hast received, why dost thou glory, as if thou hadst not received it?" Or again when a man prefers to God the temporal good in which he glories: for this is forbidden (Jeremiah 9:23-24): "Let not the wise man glory in his wisdom, and let not the strong man glory in his strength, and let not the rich man glory in his riches. But let him that glorieth glory in this, that he understandeth and knoweth Me." Or again when a man prefers the testimony of man to God's; thus it is written in reproval of certain people (John 12:43): "For they loved the glory of men more than the glory of God."

In another way vainglory may be contrary to charity, on the part of the one who glories, in that he refers his intention to glory as his last end: so that he directs even virtuous deeds thereto, and, in order to obtain it, forbears not from doing even that which is against God. On this way it is a mortal sin. Wherefore Augustine says (De Civ. Dei v, 14) that "this vice," namely the love of human praise, "is so hostile to a godly faith, if the heart desires glory more than it fears or loves God, that our Lord said (John 5:44): How can you believe, who receive glory one from another, and the glory which is from God alone, you do not seek?"

If, however, the love of human glory, though it be vain, be not inconsistent with charity, neither as regards the matter gloried in, nor as to the intention of him that seeks glory, it is not a mortal but a venial sin.

According to the Revelation 20.11-15, the dead in Christ will receive a perfect glorified body at the first resurrection; those saints alive will be transformed into a glorified perfect body. The second resurrection is for the white throne judgement. Those not resurrected in the first resurrection will be resurrected for judgement to include those born during the thousand-year kingdom. Those whose names do not appear in the book of life will be thrown in the lake of fire.

== In art ==
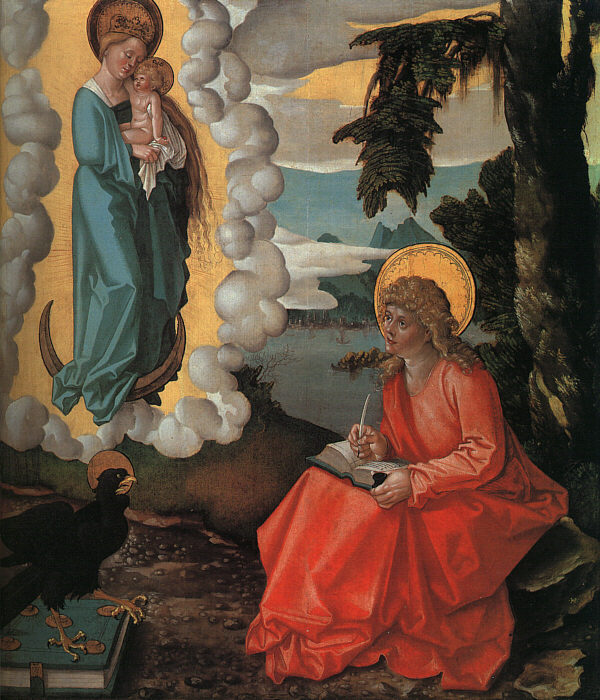
"Saint John on Patmos" by Hans Baldung Grien, 1511

The manifestation of glory (upon a saint for example) is often depicted in iconography using the religious symbol of a halo. Other common symbols of glory include white robes, crowns, jewels, gold, and stars. The Coronation of the Virgin is one of the most common depictions of Mary in glory.

There are a number of specialised senses of "glory" in art, which all derive from French usages of "gloire". "Glory" was the medieval English word for a halo or aureole, and continues to be used sometimes in this sense, mostly for the full-body version. The subject of Christ in Majesty is also known as "Christ in Glory", and in general any depiction of a sacred person in heaven (e.g. in the clouds, surrounded by angels) can be called a "glory", although this sense is obsolete.

== See also ==
- Apotheosis
- Hod (Kabbalah)
- K-B-D
- Tabor Light
- Tasbih
- Theophany
