= Raija Sollamo =

- Born: December 9, 1942 (age 83); Padasjoki
- Education: University of Helsinki
- Scientific career
- Fields: Dead Sea Scrolls, Septuagint
- Doctoral advisor: Ilmari Soisalon-Soininen
- Doctoral students: Jutta Jokiranta

Raija Tellervo Sollamo (née Pursula; born December 9, 1942, in Padasjoki) is a Finnish theologian and professor emerita of Biblical Languages in the Faculty of Theology, University of Helsinki. She was the first female professor in the field of theology in Finland. Between 1998 and 2003, Sollamo was vice-rector of the University of Helsinki, thereby becoming the first female vice-rector in Finland. From 2007 to 2010, she was president of The International Organization for the Study of the Old Testament (IOSOT).

== Awards and recognition ==
Sollamo has received numerous awards and accolades: the Academy of Finland Doctoral Thesis Award (1980), the University of Helsinki Eino Kaila Award (1992), elected Woman of the Year (social influence) by the Finnish business and Professional Women Association (1993), the Maikki Friberg Equality Prize (1996), and the Alfred Kordelin Foundation Award (2014). Since 2002, she is an honorary member of the Finnish Exegetical Society and since 2006 a member of the Finnish Academy of Sciences.

== Books ==
- Harviainen, Tapani & Sollamo, Raija (eds): Heprean tekstikirja ja sanasto. Helsinki: Gaudeamus, 1973 (3rd ed., 1978). [[Toiminnot:Kirjalähteet/9516620450|ISBN 951-662-045-0]].
- Sollamo, Raija: Renderings of Hebrew Semiprepositions in the Septuagint. AASF 19 (PhD diss.). Helsinki: Suomalainen Tiedeakatemia, 1979. [[Toiminnot:Kirjalähteet/9514103483|ISBN 951-41-0348-3]].
- Aejmelaeus, Anneli & Sollamo, Raija (eds): Studien zur Septuaginta-Syntax: Ilmari Soisalon-Soininen zu seinem 70. Geburtstag am 4. Juni 1987. AASF B 237. Helsinki: Suomalainen tiedeakatemia, 1987. [[Toiminnot:Kirjalähteet/9514105516|ISBN 951-41-0551-6]].
- Sollamo, Raija: Raamatun naisia. Helsinki: Kirjaneliö, 1983. [[Toiminnot:Kirjalähteet/9516006213|ISBN 951-600-621-3]].
- Sollamo, Raija (ed.): Kuolleen meren kirjakääröt: Qumranin tekstit suomeksi. Helsinki: Yliopistopaino, 1991. [[Toiminnot:Kirjalähteet/9515700728|ISBN 951-570-072-8]].
- Sollamo, Raija & Dunderberg, Ismo (ed.): Naisia Raamatussa: Viisaus ja rakkaus. Helsinki: Yliopistopaino, 1992. [[Toiminnot:Kirjalähteet/9515701198|ISBN 951-570-119-8]].
- Sollamo, Raija (ed.): Paimentolaisten uskonnosta kirkkolaitokseksi. Suomen eksegeettisen seuran julkaisuja 55. Helsinki: Suomen eksegeettinen seura, 1991 (2nd ed., 1993). [[Toiminnot:Kirjalähteet/951921710X|ISBN 951-9217-10-X]].
- Sollamo, Raija: Repetition of the Possessive Pronouns in the Septuagint. Septuagint and cognate studies series 40. Atlanta, GA: Scholars Press, 1995. [[Toiminnot:Kirjalähteet/0788501496|ISBN 0-7885-0149-6]].
- Sollamo, Raija (ed.): Qumranin kirjasto: Valikoima teoksia. Helsinki: Yliopistopaino, 1997. [[Toiminnot:Kirjalähteet/9515703697|ISBN 951-570-369-7]].
