= K-B-D =

Linguistic root in Semitic languages

K-B-D (Hebrew: כ־ב־ד; East Semitic K-B-T; Arabic: ك-ب-د) is a triliteral Semitic root with the common meaning of to "be heavy", and thence "be important; honour, majesty, glory".

The basic noun formed from the root means "liver", "interior", "soul" in most Semitic languages. The Akkadian word for liver is spelled with the sumerogram 𒂂, transliterated kabtu; the Ugaritic cognate is spelled 𐎋𐎁𐎄 kbd.

There is a wide range of uses for kbd as a noun among the Semitic languages. It can be used literally to denote the organ of the "liver", or more figuratively to refer to the "interior of the body", seen as being "the seat of human will and emotions."

== Akkadian kbt ==
In Akkadian, an East Semitic language which has the kbt form of the root, kabattu is used to denote the realm of "violent emotions" and "blind passions".

According to Wolfgang Heimpel in Letters to the King of Mari, the Babylonian root kbt was vocalized as kbd in Mari, and an adjectival derivation of the root appears in Mari inscriptions that record royal correspondences. Heimpel translated its meaning as "heavy", as in the following excerpt: "The troops are well. The tablets are heavy for the messengers whom Ibal-Pi-El is sending, and so my mail to you is not regular."

== Early West Semitic ==
The K-B-D root is a constituent of personal names in many West Semitic languages and are found in inscriptions of the Amorites, Ugarits, and Punics. Scholars like J.C. de Moor and F. de Meyer have also claimed that kbd is used as the root for the name of a god, Kabidu.

In Ugaritic, kbd is often paired with lb to denote "the seat of feelings and emotions", as in a text which reads: "'Her liver' swells with laughter, her heart is filled with joy, Anat's 'liver' with victory." The Ugaritic verb kbd means "to honour", "be weighty/honoured", or figuratively, "to make heavy", and encapsulates only the positive meaning of the word. Kbd is also used as an adjective in Ugaritic, meaning "heavy" or "valuable", and was used in administrative texts to describe quantities, whereby kbd "designates a heavier weight in contrast to the normal lighter weight".

== Biblical Hebrew ==
Kbd appears in the Hebrew Bible 376 times. Twice, its meaning is literally "heavy", as in the first book of Samuel 4:18, where Eli is said to be "heavy", and in second book of Samuel 14:2 where Absalom's hair is described as "heavy". However, the dominant usage of the root throughout most of the text is "heavy", with a meaning negative in connotation. In Hebrew, the word for both heavy and liver is kaved (Hebrew: כָּבֵד), following from its Semitic roots.

This negative usage of heavy in the Hebrew Bible has been divided into three sub-groups. The first of these deals with the "insensitivity or dullness of the human body," so that, for example, in the book of Exodus, kbd is used to describe "the hardening of the Pharaoh's" heart. The second subgroup involves the use of kbd to refer to a concept related to "severity", in terms of "work, slavery, warfare, plague, or famine," and is perhaps best translated in these cases as a transitive verb, such as "burden", "weigh down" or "impede".

The hand of the Lord, for example, is described as "heavy", as in the first book of Samuel 5:6 or in the Psalms 32:4. The third subgroup is one in which kbd is used negatively to refer to magnitude in size or numbers, such as in discussing the greatness of a sin, or the size of an army. For example, the sin of Sodom and Gomorrah is described as very heavy.

The use of kbd as positive in connotation does also appear in the Hebrew Bible. In Genesis 13:2, Abraham is described as very "heavy" in the context of his material wealth and importance and other figures to whom positive adjectives such as "heroic" or "glorious" are attached, are also described as kbd ("heavy"). Kbd is also used to refer to the "heaviness" of God, and in this case it is most commonly translated as referring to his "glory". God's glory (kabhodh: Septuagint dóxa) was visible fire It is occasionally used also of the soul or spirit in man

Instead of using K-B-D, Aramaic usually uses יקר yaqar, meaning "be heavy," and "be precious," which may have subsequently entered Hebrew as an Aramaic loanword. In Hebrew, Y-Q-R is found in the adjective yaqar (Hebrew: יָקָר) meaning both dear and expensive, the noun yeqar (Hebrew: יְקָר) meaning honor and respect and another noun, yoqer (Hebrew: יֹקֶר) meaning expensiveness, one verb yaqar (Hebrew: יָקַר) meaning to be appreciated and another verb yiqer (Hebrew: יִקֵּר) meaning to make expensive.

In the Dead Sea Scrolls, the usage of the root closely follows the biblical usage. Of the 30 occurrences of the root, 13 are of the nif'al participle ("those who are honored"), 10 are of the word meaning honor, though in addition there is one instance of the postbiblical meaning "sweep up, clean." In terms of its positive connotations the root is also found in this word for honour "kavod" (כָּבוֹד) which is found in the Hebrew expression Kol HaKavod (Hebrew: כֹּל הַכָּבוֹד) meaning "all of the honour" and used to congratulate someone for a job well done. Bekhavod (Hebrew: בכבוד, "with honour") is the most common valediction used in Hebrew.

Root: K-B-D (כבד): meaning "heavy", "honour", or "liver"
Hebrew	Transliteration	Definition
כָּבֵד	kaved (adj.)	heavy
הִכְבִּיד	hikhbid (v.r.)	to be heavy
כָּבֵד	kaved (n. m.)	liver
כָּבוֹד	kavod (n. m.)	honor, glory
כִּבֵּד	kibed (v.)	to give honour to
בכבוד	bekhavod (n. m.)	(valediction) with honour/respectfully
כבודו	kvodo (n. m.)	his majesty
כִּבּוּד	kibud (n. m.)	honouring
כִּבּוּדִים	kibudim (n. m. pl.)	acknowledgements
כָּבוּד	kavud (adj.)	honorable, distinguished
כִּבּוּד	kibud (n. m.)	(literary) cleaning, sweeping
כִּבֵּד	kibed (v.)	(literary) to clean a room, to sweep
כָּבַד	kavad (v.)	(biblical) to weigh heavily upon
כֹּבֶד	koved (n. m.)	(physics) mass, weight

== Arabic ==
The root kbd is used as in the other Semitic languages to refer to the "interior" or "middle" of something, and this is its most common use in Arabic. In both Hebrew and Arabic, as a noun, it means "liver," and the liver in Arabic and Hebrew, as with the other Semitic languages described above, is "an organ thought to be the seat of passion, especially of burning feelings like hate, spite, malice, etc." It can also be used to refer to the entire stomach and entrails. For example, in a Bedouin poem from central Arabia, it is written that "clean, sweet water filled my entrails (after revenge was taken)." or in Jewish Liturgy "God scrutinizes the Entrails and Hearts [of men]"

In Arabic, the verb kabada itself is limited to its negative meaning of "oppress" and "endure". However, K-B-D shows instances of semantic overlap with the root K-B-R. So that in Arabic, for example, the verb kabura means to "be/become large", echoing the semantic meaning of the K-B-D root as used in other Semitic languages. In Libyan Arabic, the word kabdah كبدة, in addition to its literal meaning as liver, also refers to the person one deeply loves. The expression 'sħanli kabdi' – literally: He squished my liver – expresses the condition of being deeply emotionally moved.
