= Magne Sæbø =

Norwegian biblical scholar

Magne Sæbø (23 January 1929 – 12 September 2025) was a Norwegian biblical scholar specializing in the Old Testament.

He has spent most of his professional life as student and professor at MF Norwegian School of Theology in Oslo. 1995–1998 he was president of the International Organisation for the Study of the Old Testament. He is a member of the Norwegian Academy of Science and Letters and Knight First Class of the Royal Norwegian Order of St. Olav.

He was a candidate in theology in 1956 and received his PhD in 1969 with a doctoral thesis on Zechariah 9-14. He was subsequently professor of Old Testament studies from 1970 to 1999, as well as dean twice (1975–77 and 1988–90). He has edited the Biblia Hebraica Quinta series, and a number of English encyclopedias and reference books, as well as the Hebrew Bible / Old Testament: A History of its Interpretation, (Göttingen).

Sæbø has also been active in revision of the Norwegian translation of the Bible, and contributed to the Norwegian Bible Society from 1965 to 1991.

He resides at Evje.

Sæbø died on 12 September 2025, at the age of 96.

== See also ==
- Biblia Hebraica Quinta
