= International Organization for the Study of the Old Testament =

The International Organization for the Study of the Old Testament (IOSOT) is a scientific organization of Old Testament scholars, established in 1950 in Leiden. The first congress was held in 1953 in Copenhagen.

== List of congresses and presidents ==
No.	Place	Date	President
1	Copenhagen	25–28 Aug 1953	Edith Bentzen-Smith
2	Strasbourg	27 Aug–1 Sept 1956	Roland de Vaux
3	Oxford	31 Aug–5 Sept 1959	Godfrey Rolles Driver
4	Bonn	26–31 Aug 1962	Martin Noth
5	Geneva	22–28 Aug 1965	Johann Jakob Stamm
6	Rome	15–19 Aug 1968	Roderick Andrew Francis MacKenzie
7	Uppsala	8–12 Aug 1971	Helmer Ringgren
8	Edinburgh	18–23 Aug 1974	George W. Anderson
9	Göttingen	21–26 Aug 1977	Walther Zimmerli
10	Vienna	24–29 Aug 1980	Walter Kornfeld
11	Salamanca	28 Aug–2 Sept 1983	Luis Alonso Schökel
12	Jerusalem	24–29 Aug 1986	Benjamin Mazar
13	Leuven	27 Aug–1 Sept 1989	Chris Brekelmans
14	Paris	19–24 July 1992	André Caquot
15	Cambridge	16–21 July 1995	John Emerton
16	Oslo	2–7 Aug 1998	Magne Sæbø
17	Basel	5–10 Aug 2001	Ernst Jenni
18	Leiden	1–6 Aug 2004	Arie van der Kooij
19	Ljubljana	15–20 July 2007	Jože Krašovec
20	Helsinki	1–6 Aug 2010	Raija Sollamo
21	Munich	4–9 Aug 2013	Christoph Levin
22	Stellenbosch	4–9 Sept 2016	Johann Cook
23	Aberdeen	4–9 Aug 2019	Joachim Schaper
24	Zürich	8–12 Aug 2022	Konrad Schmid
25	Berlin	11–15 Aug 2025	Bernd Schipper
26	Rome	10–14 July 2028	Peter Dubovsky

== Bibliography ==
- Rudolf Smend Jr. and David E. Orton (Translator): "Fifty Years International Organization for the Study of the Old Testament and Vetus Testamentum" In: Vetus Testamentum 50 (2000), pp. 14–26.
