= Walther Zimmerli =

Swiss academic theologian (1907–1983)

- Born: 21 January 1907; Schiers, Graubünden, Switzerland
- Died: 4 December 1983 (aged 76); Oberdiessbach, Bern, Switzerland

Academic background
- Education: University of Zurich; Humboldt University of Berlin; University of Göttingen

Academic work
- Discipline: Theology; Old Testament
- Institutions: University of Göttingen
- Doctoral students: Claus Westermann
- Notable works: Ezechiel (Biblischer Kommentar Altes Testament)

Walther Theodor Zimmerli (20 January 1907 – 4 December 1983) was a Swiss academic theologian in the Reformed tradition and an Old Testament scholar.

== Life ==
After finishing secondary school in Schiers, Zimmerli studied theology at the universities of Zurich, Berlin and Göttingen. After passing his practical exams at the end of April 1930, he worked in the Theological Faculty at the University of Göttingen as the assistant to Professors Hemperl and Rahlfs and earned his Licentiate in Theology (lic. theol.) in 1932.

When the Nazi Party came to power in Germany, Zimerli returned to Switzerland and, in August 1933, became a pastor in Aarburg in the Canton of Aargau. But already in 1935 he was called to be a Lecturer by the University of Zurich and in 1938 was made full professor of Old Testament, History of Religions and Oriental Languages. After further teaching in Berlin and Montpellier, he was called, in 1951, to be Professor of Old Testament at the University of Göttingen. He remained there until he retired, and also served as rector of the university from 1964–1966.

In 1964–65 he initiated and was president of the first of the Confederation of European Union Rectors' Conferences, which was held in Göttingen. Zimmerli was active in the academic division of the Council of Europe, served on the board of the World Rectors' Conference and was in the senate of the Deutschen Forschungsgemeinschaft. Between 1970 and 1978, he was president of the Akademie der Wissenschaften zu Göttingen (the Göttingen Academy of Sciences), and he also served as the president of the "Konferenz der deutschen Akademien der Wissenschaften" (the "Conference of [West] German Academies of Science").

In 1940 Zimmerli founded the "Reformierte Theologenhaus" in Zurich and after 1945 further Reformed houses of study for students in all disciplines. In 1949, Claus Westermann earned his doctoral degree in Zurich under Zimmerli for his dissertation "Das Loben Gottes in den Psalmen" ("Praise of God in the Psalms").

Zimmerli was a well known representative of his discipline and was therefore invited to be a guest professor at Yale University, granted many honorary doctorates (from Göttingen, Zurich, Strasbourg, and Edinburgh), and was the 1972 recipient of the Burkitt Medal of the British Academy.

In addition to his academic achievements, notable too was Zimmerli's unwavering opposition, from the very beginning, to Nazism. He contested Swiss neutrality during the Second World War, served in active duty from 1940 as a military chaplain in the Swiss Army (a post in which he remained until 1951, serving more than 300 days in active duty) and staunchly took a stand opposing pogroms against Jews and euthanasia. At the same time, after 1945, he was one of the first academics to attempt to re-establish contact with Germany, and did not hesitate to accept the call to Göttingen in 1951. There, Zimmerli became one of the most loved teachers in the Göttingen Theological Faculty of the twentieth century.

During his time as a student in Göttingen, Zimmerli married Irmgard von der Ropp, with whom he had six children. One of his sons is the philosopher Walther Christoph Zimmerli.

== Work ==
The significance of Walther Zimmerli lies first and foremost in his academic work. He wrote fundamental commentaries on Genesis and Ecclesiastes, and one of his most important works is his two-volume commentary on Ezekiel in the series "Biblischer Kommentar zum Alten Testament" (translated into English for the Hermeneia commentary series). This commentary laid an entirely new foundation for understanding Book of Ezekiel. Zimmerli's scholarship is embodied in his Grundriß der alttestamentlichen Theologie (Old Testament Theology in Outline), which has appeared in numerous editions since its first publication.

== Bibliography ==
Festschriften

- Herbert Donner, ed., Beiträge zur alttestamentlichen Theologie: Festschrift für Walther Zimmerli zum 70. Geburtstag (Göttingen 1977)

Lexicon articles

- Wolfdietrich von Kloeden (1998). "Walther Zimmerli". In Bautz, Traugott (ed.). Biographisch-Bibliographisches Kirchenlexikon (BBKL) (in German). Vol. 14. Herzberg: Bautz. cols. 478–486. ISBN 3-88309-073-5.
