= Glory (honor) =

High renown or praise

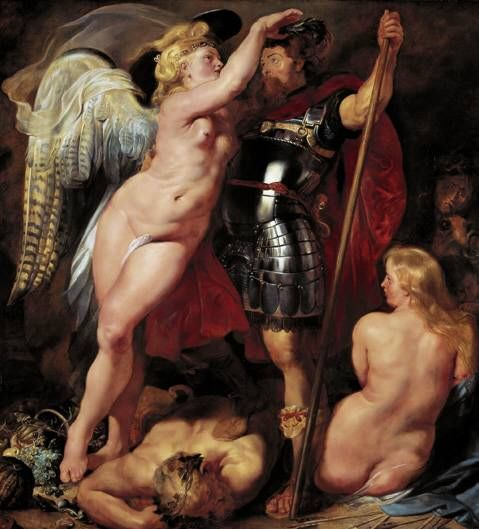
Coronation of the Hero of Virtue by Peter Paul Rubens, c. 1612–1614

Allegory of glory, holding a laurel wreath, in the Panthéon of Paris (France).

Glory is high renown, praise, and honor obtained by notable achievements, and based in extensive common consent. In Greek culture, fame and glory were highly considered, as is explained in The Symposium, one of Plato's dialogs.

== In Greek culture (Kleos) ==
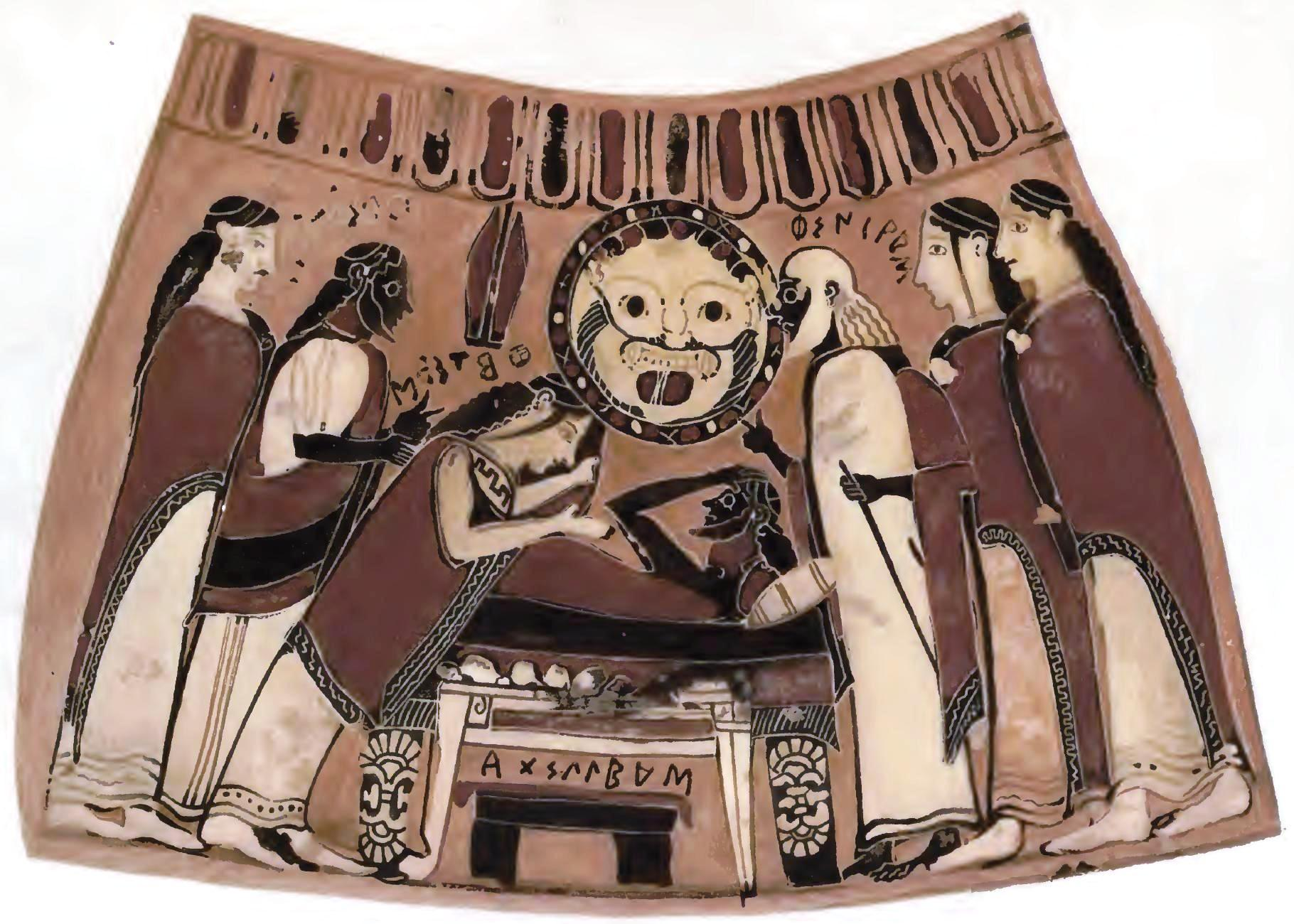
Achilles mourning the death of Patroclus. Corinthian Chytra

Kleos (Greek: κλέος) is the Greek word often translated to "renown", or "glory". It is related to the word for "to hear" and carries the implied meaning of "what others hear about you". A Greek hero earns kleos through accomplishing great deeds, often through his own death. Kleos is invariably transferred from father to son; the son is responsible for carrying on and building upon the "glory" of the father.

Kleos is a common theme in Homer's epics, the Iliad and the Odyssey, the main example in the latter being that of Odysseus and his son Telemachus, who is concerned that his father may have died a pathetic and pitiable death at sea rather than a reputable and gracious one in battle.

== Plato ==
The Greek philosopher Plato, in his dialog Symposium devoted to discussing love, digresses into the subject of fame and glory. This comes in the section that concerns the dialog between Socrates and Diotima. She is explaining that men search for some kind of immortality, for instance by means of physical and intellectual procreation. She then asserts that the love for fame and glory is very strong, and in fact to obtain them, men are ready to engage in great efforts, and also run risks and sacrifices, even of their lives (self-sacrifice), and will sacrifice still more for this than for their children. She then references Alcestis (who died to save Admetus), Achilles (to avenge Patroclus), and Codrus, as examples of heroes in search of fame and immortal renown.

Plato claimed "that there is a victory and defeat—the best and the worst—which each man sustains, not at the hands of another, but of himself". Plato emphasized that victory is self-motivated, while glory is to benefit future victory.

Plato's specific commentary about life's glories that "The first and best victory is to conquer self. To be conquered by self is, of all things, the most shameful and vile." has been later referenced by magazines and newspapers such as the American news publication Forbes (in June 1928).

== Jorge Manrique ==
Jorge Manrique was a prominent Spanish poet of the fifteenth century. His most celebrated work was Coplas a la Muerte de su Padre (Stanzas about the death of his father) that was translated into the English language by poet Henry Wadsworth Longfellow. In it is an explanation of the three lives of men:

1. the terrestrial life, that ends with death
2. the life of fame, that is retained by men's memory
3. the eternal life, of the Christian faith

The life of fame is expressed in the following verse:

No se os haga tan amarga
la batalla temerosa
que esperáis,
pues otra vida más larga
de la fama gloriosa
acá dejáis

— Jorge Manrique
Translation:

Think not the struggle that draws near
Too terrible for man, nor fear
To meet the foe;
Nor let thy noble spirit grieve,
Its life of glorious fame to leave
On earth below.

— Henry Wadsworth Longfellow

== See also ==
- Civil awards and decorations – Decoration awarded for services of a non-military nature
- Honour – Concept of worthiness and respectability
- Laureate – Winner of an award or competition
- Military awards and decorations – Award, usually a medal of some sort, mark of honor
- Praise – Expression of positive recognition, reassurance or admiration
- Thumos – Ancient Greek concept of spiritedness
- Victory – Success in any competition
