= The Four Evangelists =

The Four Evangelists may refer to:

- Four Evangelists in Christian tradition
- The Four Evangelists (Jordaens), a 1625 painting by Jacob Jordaens
- The Four Evangelists (Preti), a 1656-1660 painting by Mattia Preti
- The Four Evangelists, a 1854/55 painting by Gustave Lassalle-Bordes
