= The Four Evangelists (Preti) =

Painting by Mattia Preti

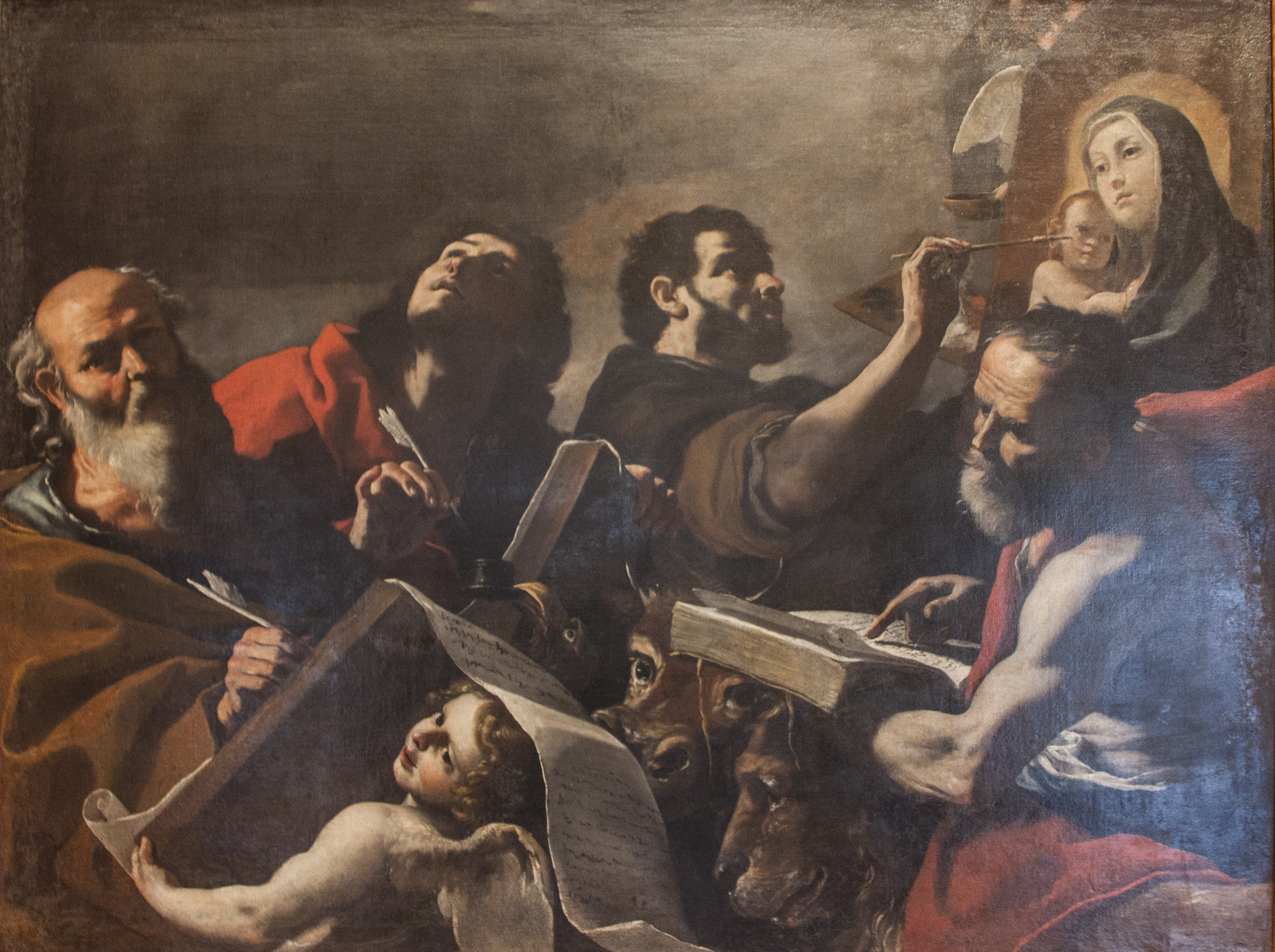
The Four Evangelists (c. 1656-1660) by Mattia Preti

The Four Evangelists is a c. 1656-1660 oil on canvas painting by Mattia Preti. It was one of forty paintings given to the Museo della Regia Università degli Studi in Palermo by Ferdinand II of the Two Sicilies and now hangs in that city's Palazzo Abatellis.
