= Four Evangelists =

Authors of the Christian gospels in art

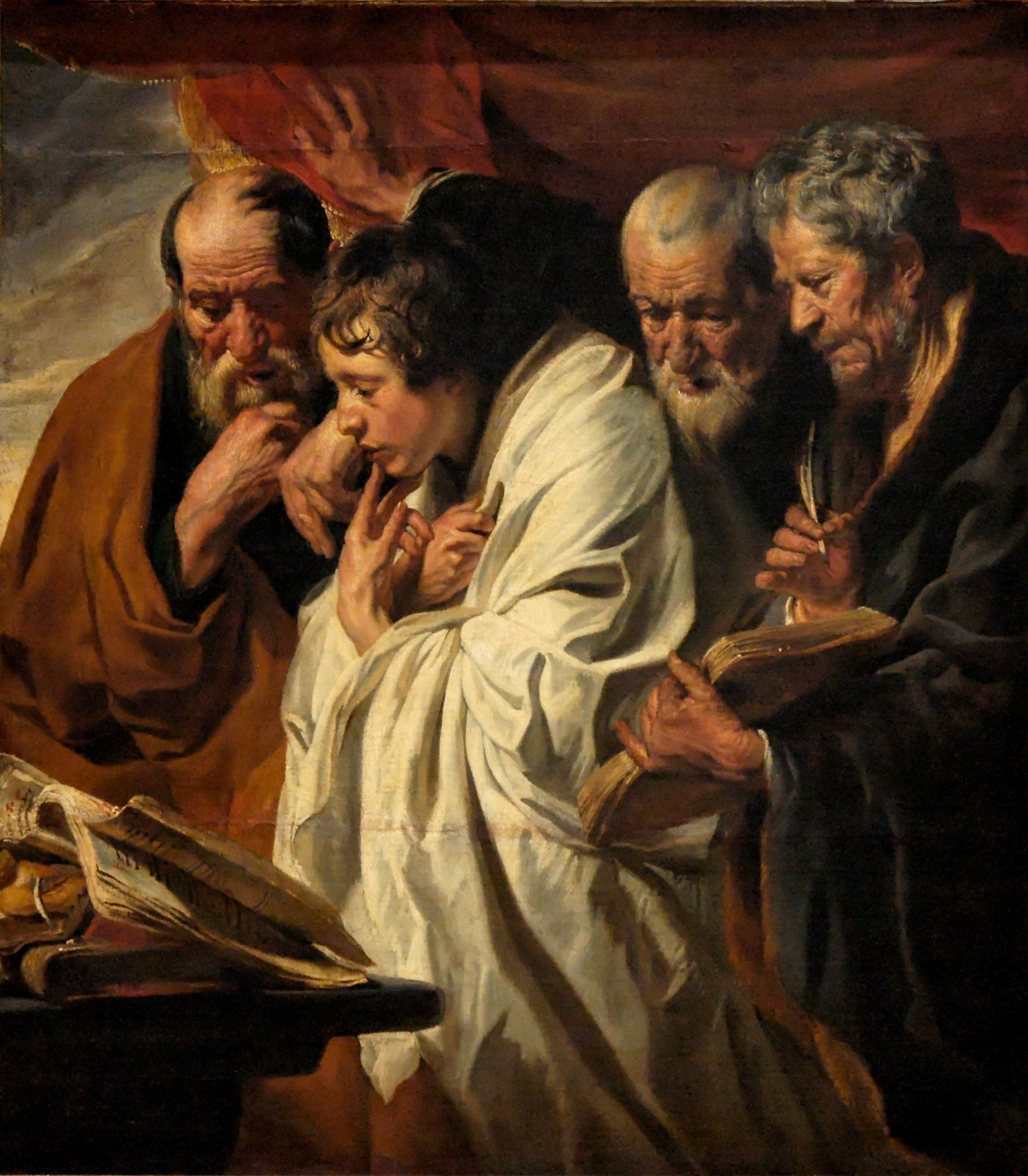
Jacob Jordaens, The Four Evangelists, 1625–1630.

In Christian tradition, the Four Evangelists are Matthew, Mark, Luke and John, the authors attributed with the creation of the four canonical Gospel accounts. In the New Testament, their Gospels bear the following titles: the Gospel of Matthew; the Gospel of Mark; the Gospel of Luke; and the Gospel of John.

There is a long tradition of depicting the four evangelists in art. They are often depicted with or as their individual symbols.

== Gospels ==
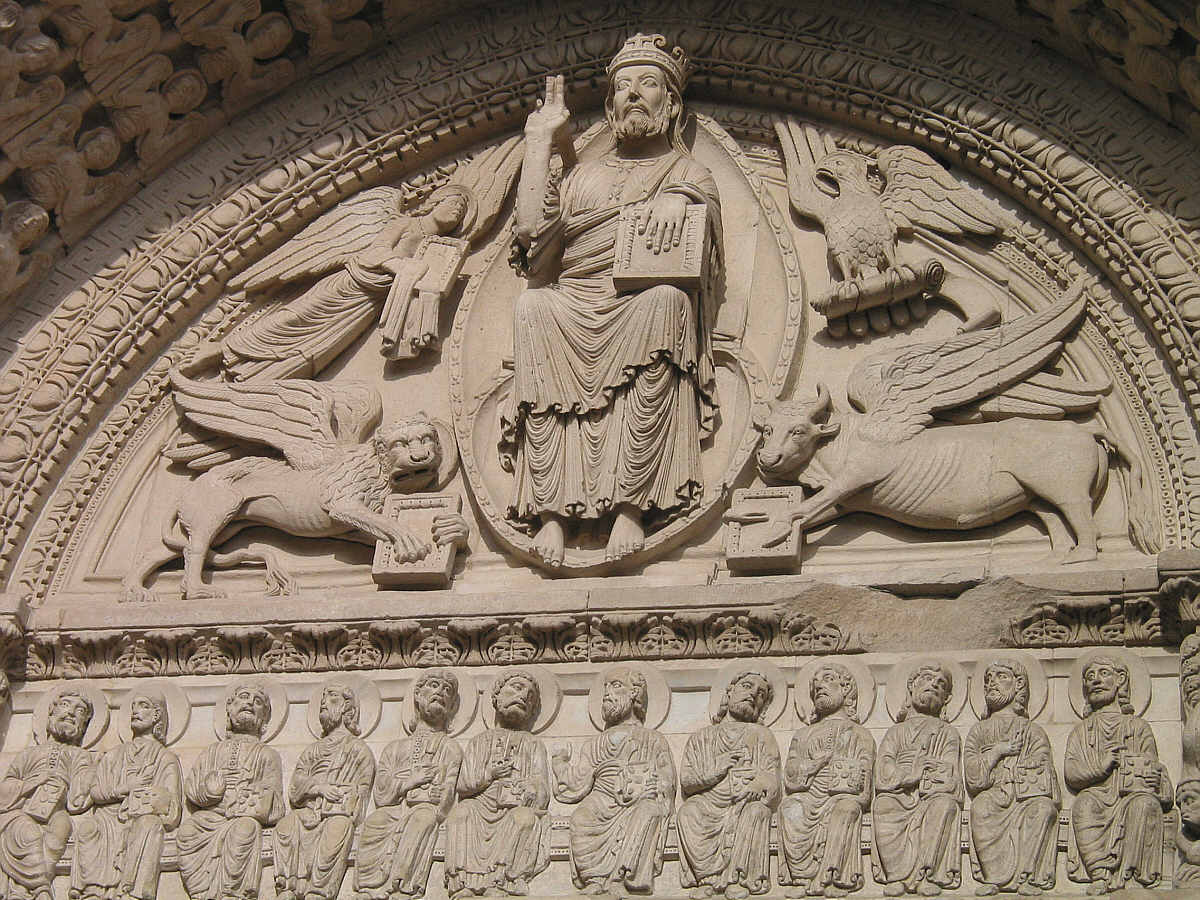
The four winged creatures that symbolize the Four Evangelists surround Christ in Majesty on the Romanesque tympanum of the Church of St. Trophime in Arles.

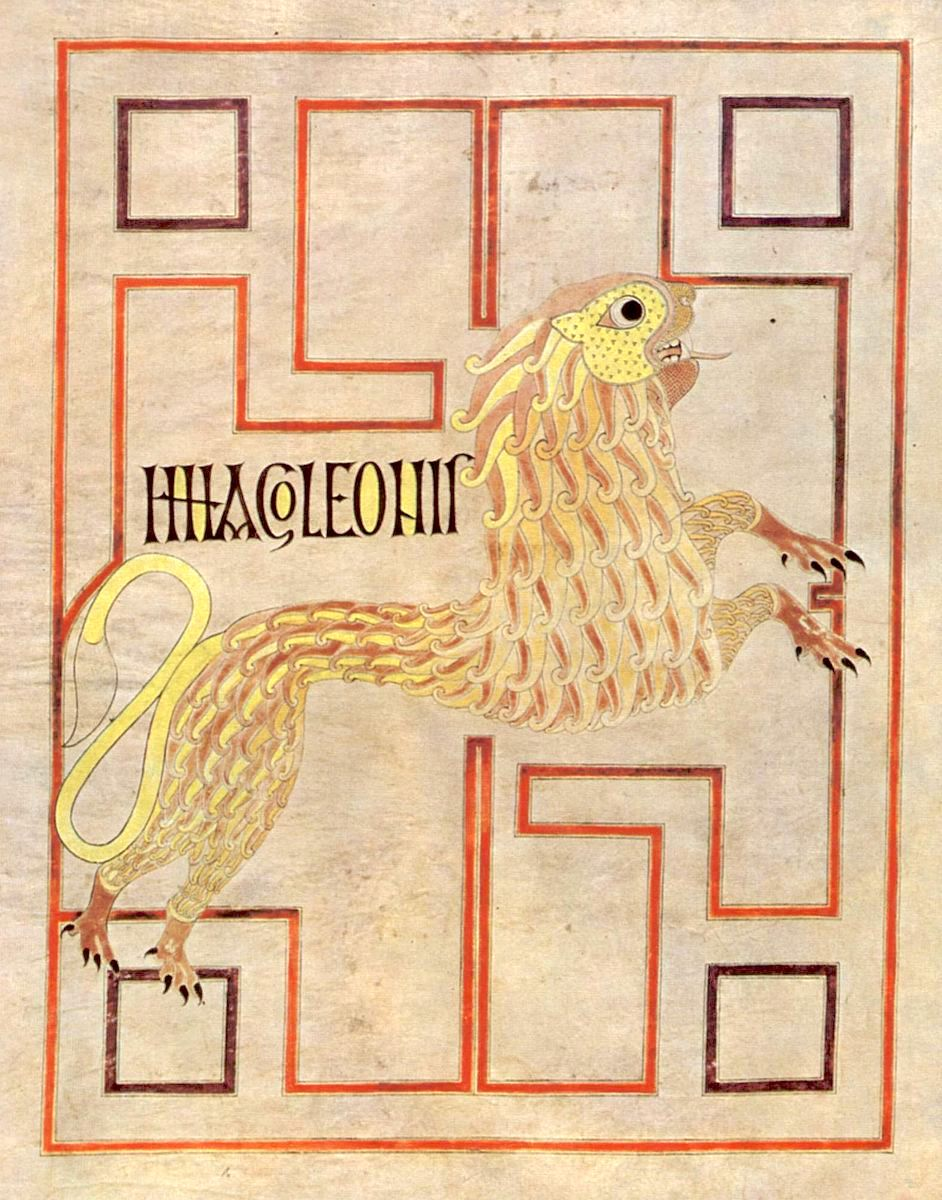
The lion symbol of St. Mark from the Echternach Gospels, here without wings. Bibliothèque nationale de France, Paris.

The gospels of Matthew, Mark, and Luke are known as the Synoptic Gospels, because they include many of the same stories, often in the same sequence or even verbatim. While the periods to which the gospels are usually dated suggest otherwise, convention traditionally holds that the authors were two of the Twelve Apostles of Jesus, John and Matthew, as well as two "apostolic men", Mark and Luke, whom Orthodox Tradition records as members of the 70 Apostles (Luke 10):

- Matthew (Greek: Ματθαῖος, Matthaîos) – a former tax collector (Levi) who was called by Jesus to be one of the Twelve Apostles
- Mark (Greek: Μᾶρκος, Mârkos) – a follower of Peter and so an "apostolic man"
- Luke (Greek: Λουκάς, Loukas) – a doctor who wrote what is now the book of Luke to Theophilus. Also known to have written the book of Acts (or Acts of the Apostles) and to have been a close friend of Paul of Tarsus
- John (Greek: Ἰωάννης, Iōannēs) – a disciple of Jesus and the youngest of his Twelve Apostles

They are called evangelists, a word meaning "people who proclaim good news", because their books aim to tell the "good news" ("gospel") of Jesus.

== Symbols ==
In iconography, the evangelists often appear in Evangelist portraits derived from classical tradition, and are also frequently represented by the symbols which originate from the four "living creatures" that draw the throne-chariot of God in the vision in Ezekiel 1 reflected in the Book of Revelation (4:6–9ff), referred to as the four 'Seraphim', though neither source links the creatures to the Evangelists (of course the depiction of the Seraphim predates in chronology the writing of the New Testament which portrays the writers John, Luke, Mark, Matthew as symbolically embodied by the four Seraphim). Images normally, but not invariably, appear with wings like angels. When the symbols of the Four Evangelists appear together, it is called a Tetramorph, common in the Romanesque art of Europe such as church frescoes or murals.

The meanings accruing to the symbols grew over centuries, with an early formulation by Jerome, and were fully expressed by Rabanus Maurus, who set out three layers of meaning for the beasts: representing first the Evangelists, second the nature of Christ, and third the virtues required of a Christian for salvation. These animals may have originally been seen as representing the highest forms of the various types of animals: man, as king of creation, as the image of the creator; the lion, as king of beasts of prey (meat-eating); the ox, as king of domesticated animals (grass-eating); the eagle, as king of birds.

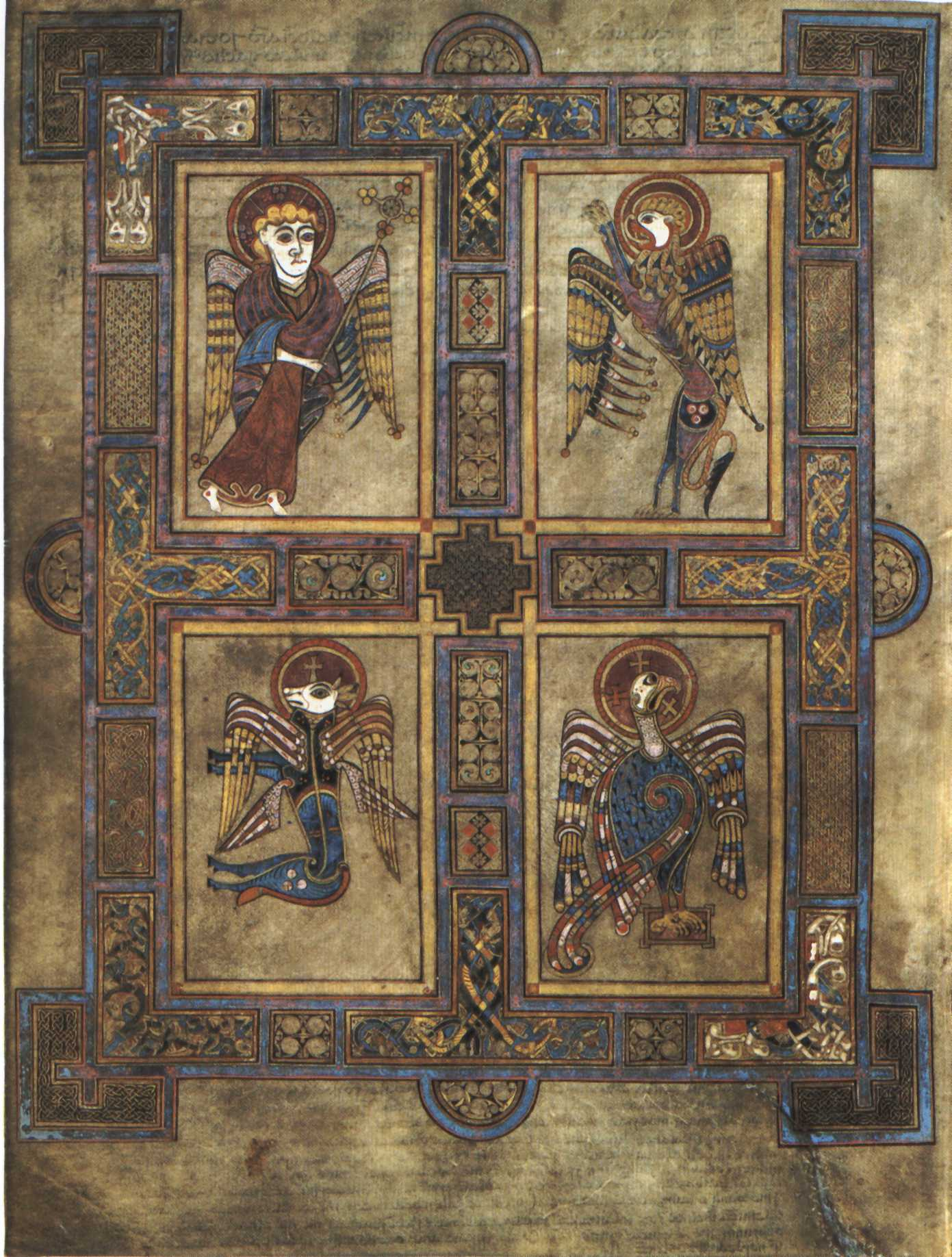
The symbols of the four Evangelists are here depicted in the Book of Kells. The four winged creatures symbolize, top to bottom, left to right: Matthew, Mark, Luke, and John.

- Matthew the Evangelist, the author of the first gospel account, is symbolized by a winged man, or angel. Matthew's gospel starts with Joseph's genealogy from Abraham; it represents Jesus's incarnation, and so Christ's human nature. This signifies that Christians should use their reason for salvation.
- Mark the Evangelist, the author of the second gospel account, is symbolized by a lion, particularly a winged lion—a figure of courage and monarchy. The lion also represents Jesus's resurrection (because lions were believed to sleep with open eyes, a comparison with Christ in the tomb), and Christ as king. This signifies that Christians should be courageous on the path of salvation.
- Luke the Evangelist, the author of the third gospel account (and the Acts of the Apostles), is symbolized by a winged ox or bull—a figure of sacrifice, service, and strength. Luke's account begins with the duties of Zechariah in the temple; it represents Jesus's sacrifice in his Passion and Crucifixion, as well as Christ being high priest (this also represents Mary's obedience). The ox signifies that Christians should be prepared to sacrifice themselves in following Christ.
- John the Evangelist, the author of the fourth gospel account, is symbolized by an eagle—a figure of the sky, and believed by Christian scholars to be able to look straight into the sun. John starts with an eternal overview of Jesus the Logos and goes on to describe many things with a "higher" christology than the other three (synoptic) gospels; it represents Jesus's Ascension and Christ's divine nature. This symbolizes that Christians should look on eternity without flinching as they journey towards their goal of union with God.
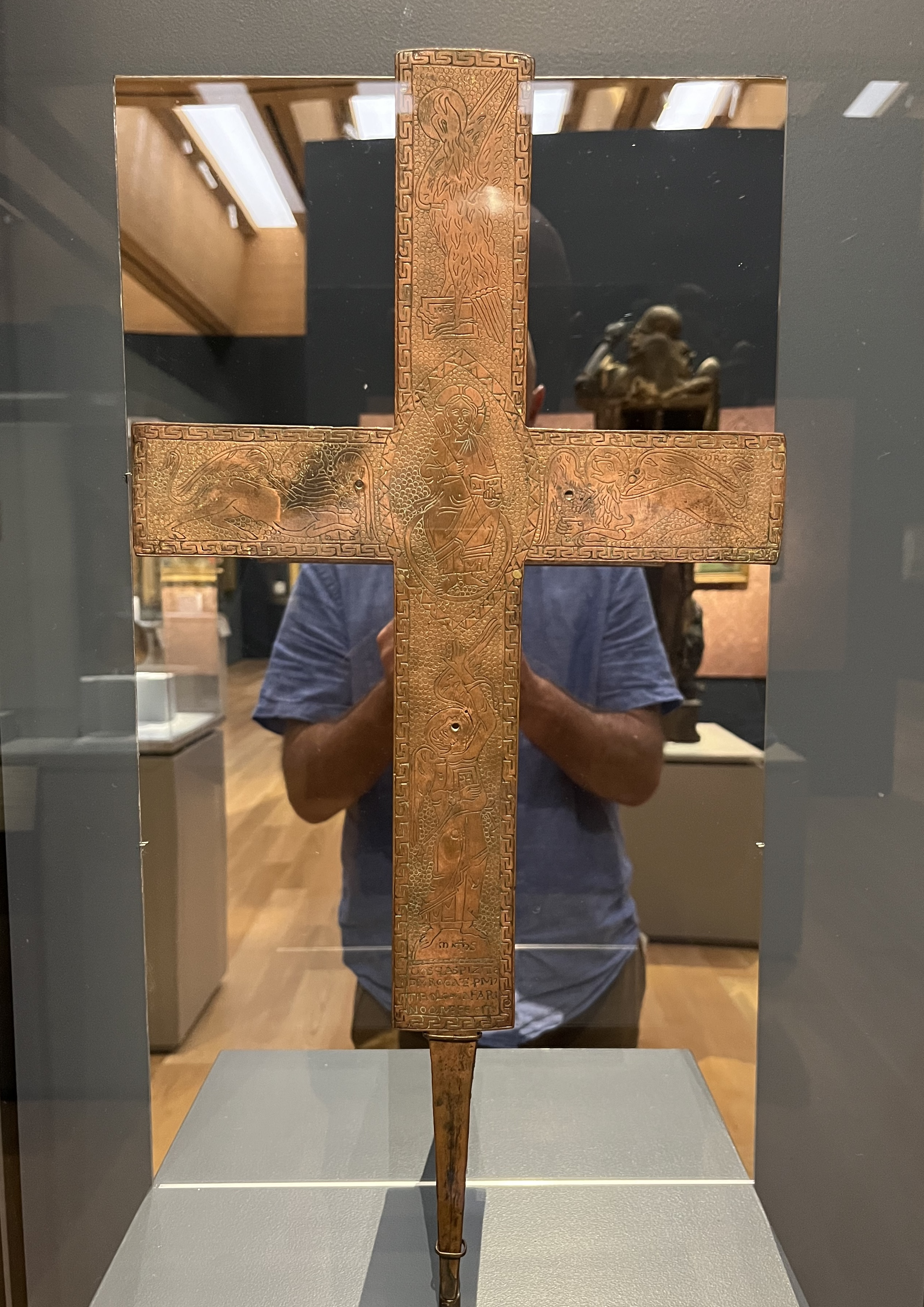
  This cross, from the 12th century, would have been mounted on a pole and carried in a liturgical procession. Christ is shown surrounded by symbols of the evangelists.

Each of the symbols is depicted with wings, following the biblical sources first in Ezekiel 1–2, and in Revelation. The symbols are shown with, or in place of, the Evangelists in early medieval Gospel Books, and are the usual accompaniment to Christ in Majesty when portrayed during the same period, reflecting the vision in Revelation. They were presented as one of the most common motifs found on church portals and apses, as well as many other locations.

When surrounding Christ, the figure of the man usually appears at top left—above Christ's right hand, with the lion above Christ's left arm. Underneath the man is the ox and underneath the lion is the eagle. This both reflects the medieval idea of the order of "nobility" of nature of the beasts (man, lion, ox, eagle) and the text of Ezekiel 1:10. From the 13th century, their use began to decline, as a new conception of Christ in Majesty, showing the wounds of the Passion, came into use. In Evangelist portraits, they sometimes appear to dictate to the writing evangelist.

== Naming ==
Matthew is often cited as the "first Gospel account", not only owing to its place in the canon, but also in view of the patristic witness to this effect. However, most biblical scholars see the gospel account of Mark as having been written first and John's gospel account as having been written last of the four. It is customary to refer to the gospels phrased as "the Gospel of Matthew" or as "Matthew's Gospel", and so on.

== Depictions ==
Paintings

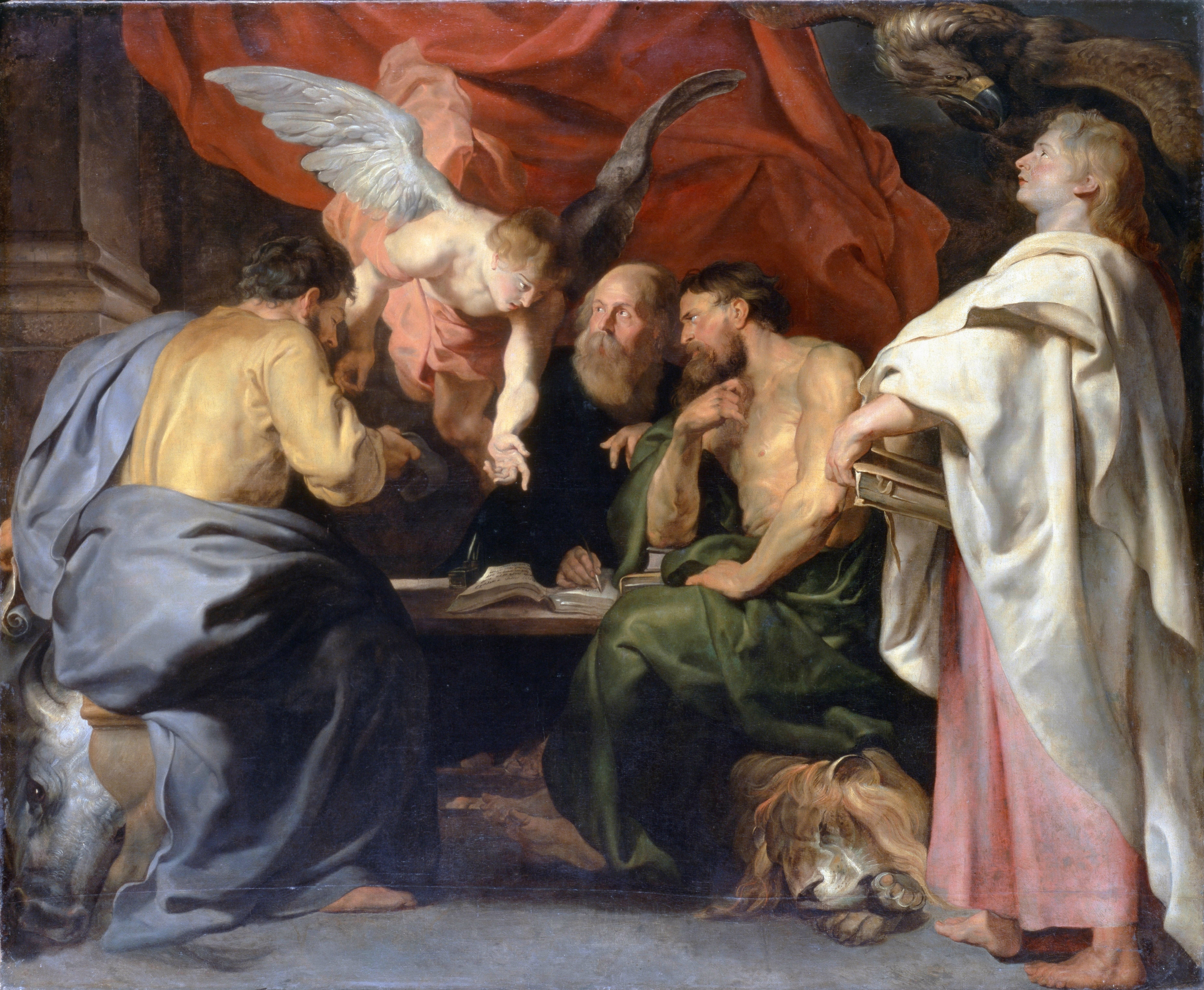
Rubens, 1614

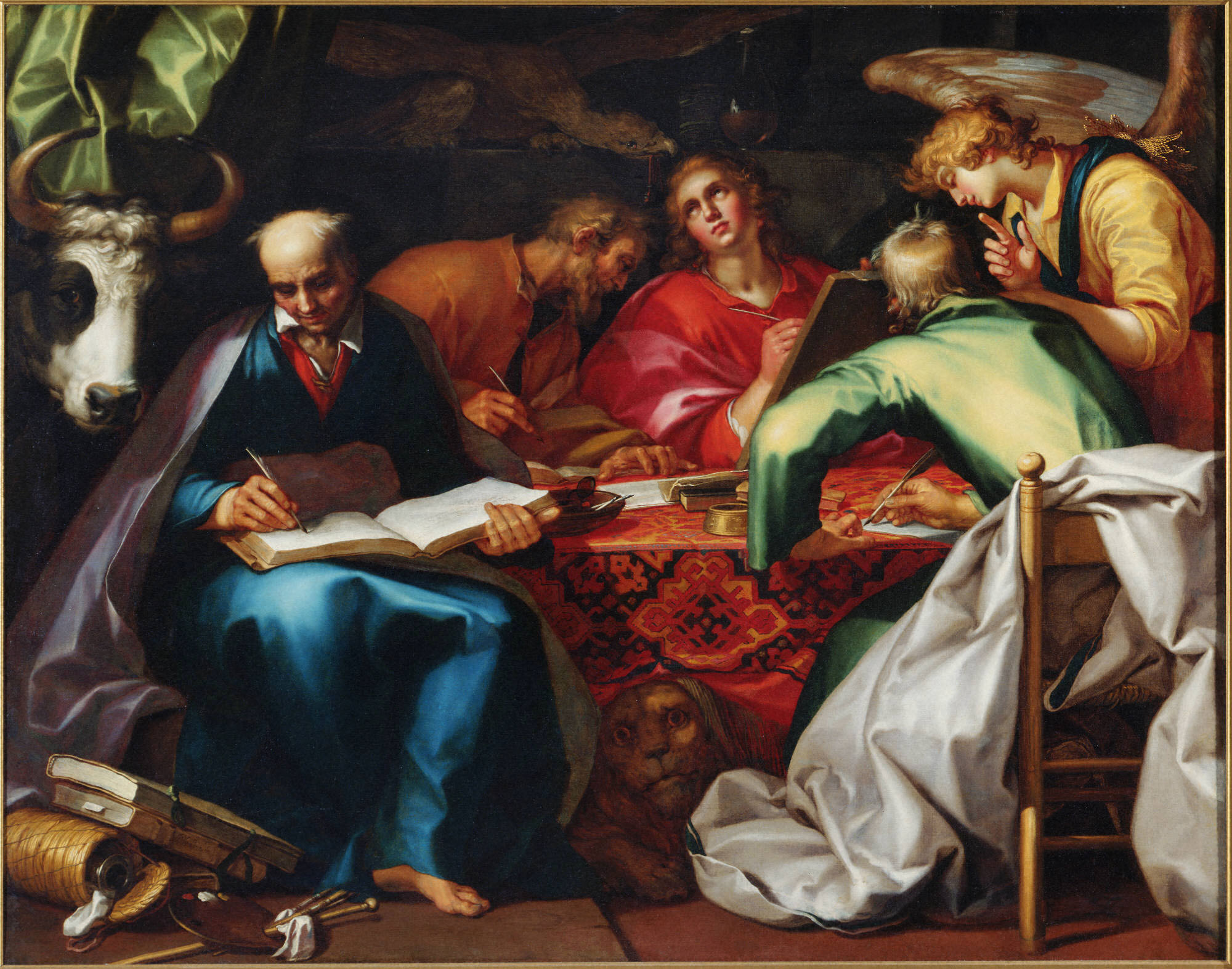
Abraham Bloemaert, c. 1612–1615, Princeton University Art Museum
Church Paintings

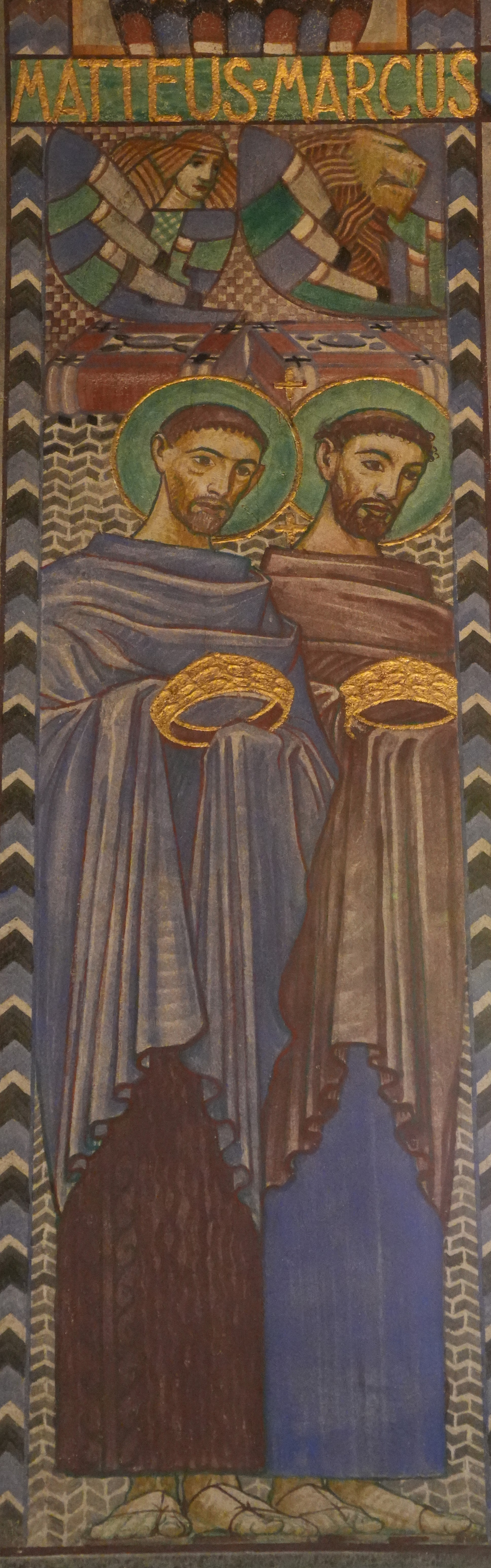
Painting of St. Matthew and St. Mark in the Evangelical-Lutheran Church of the Resurrection in Saltsjöbaden, Sweden

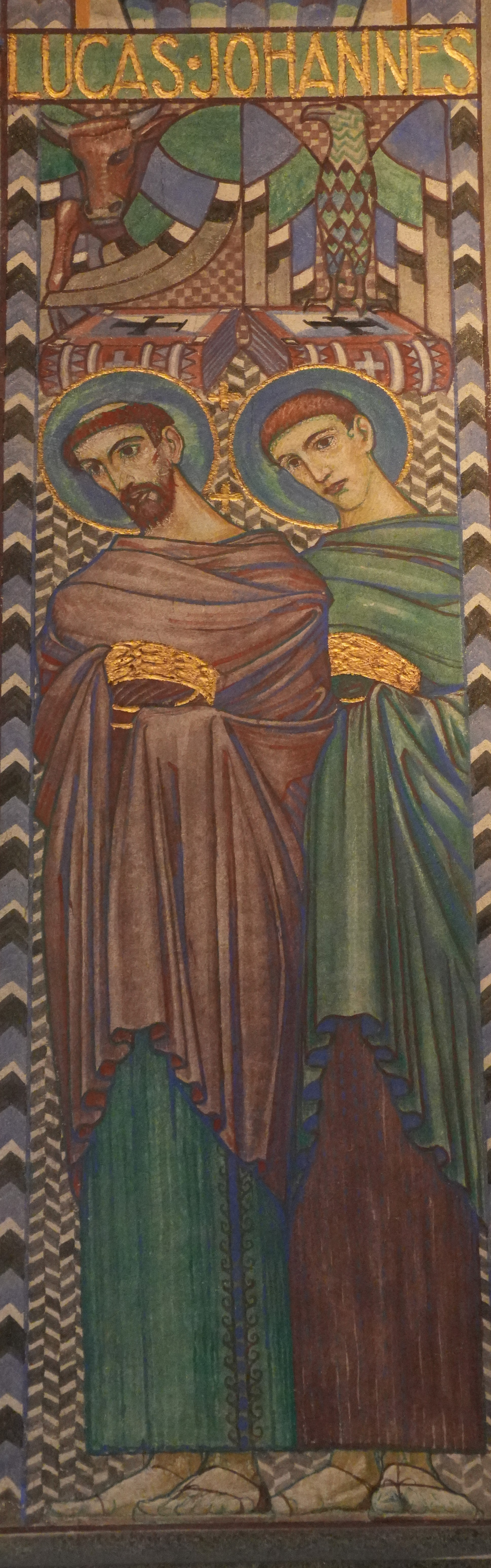
Painting of St. Luke and St. John in the Evangelical-Lutheran Church of the Resurrection in Saltsjöbaden, Sweden
Illuminated Manuscripts

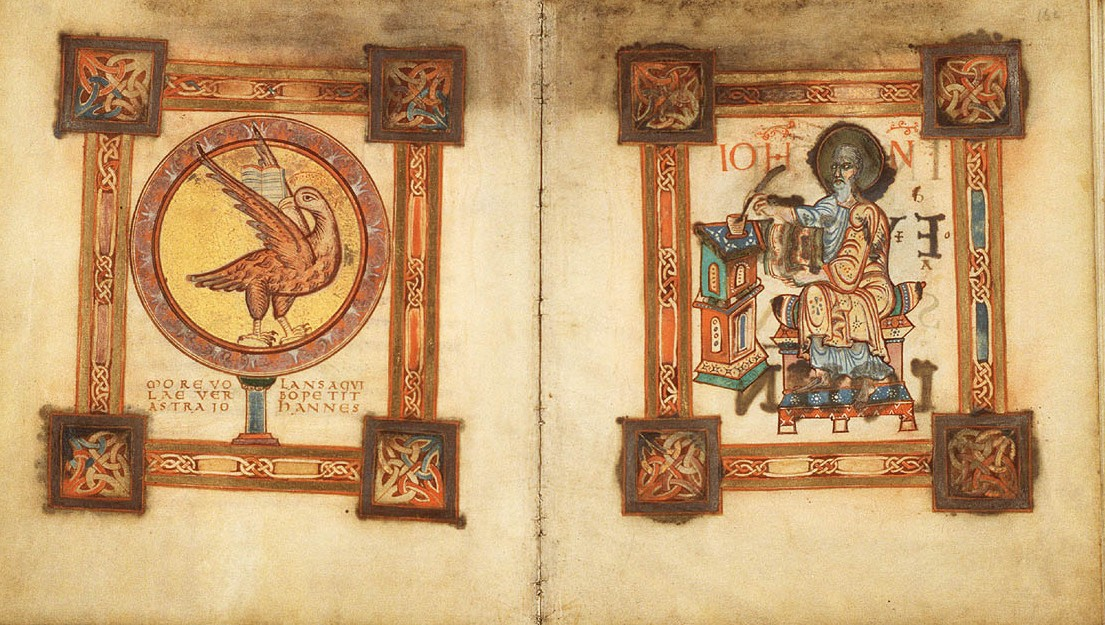
Symbol facing evangelist portrait at the start of the Gospel of St. John; Egmond Gospels, Royal Library of the Netherlands

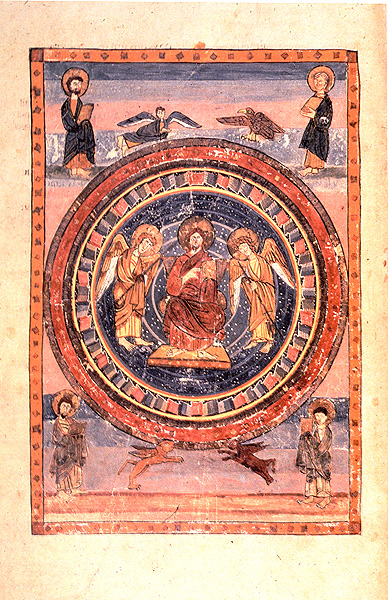
Codex Amiatinus, earliest surviving complete Vulgate Bible, 8th century

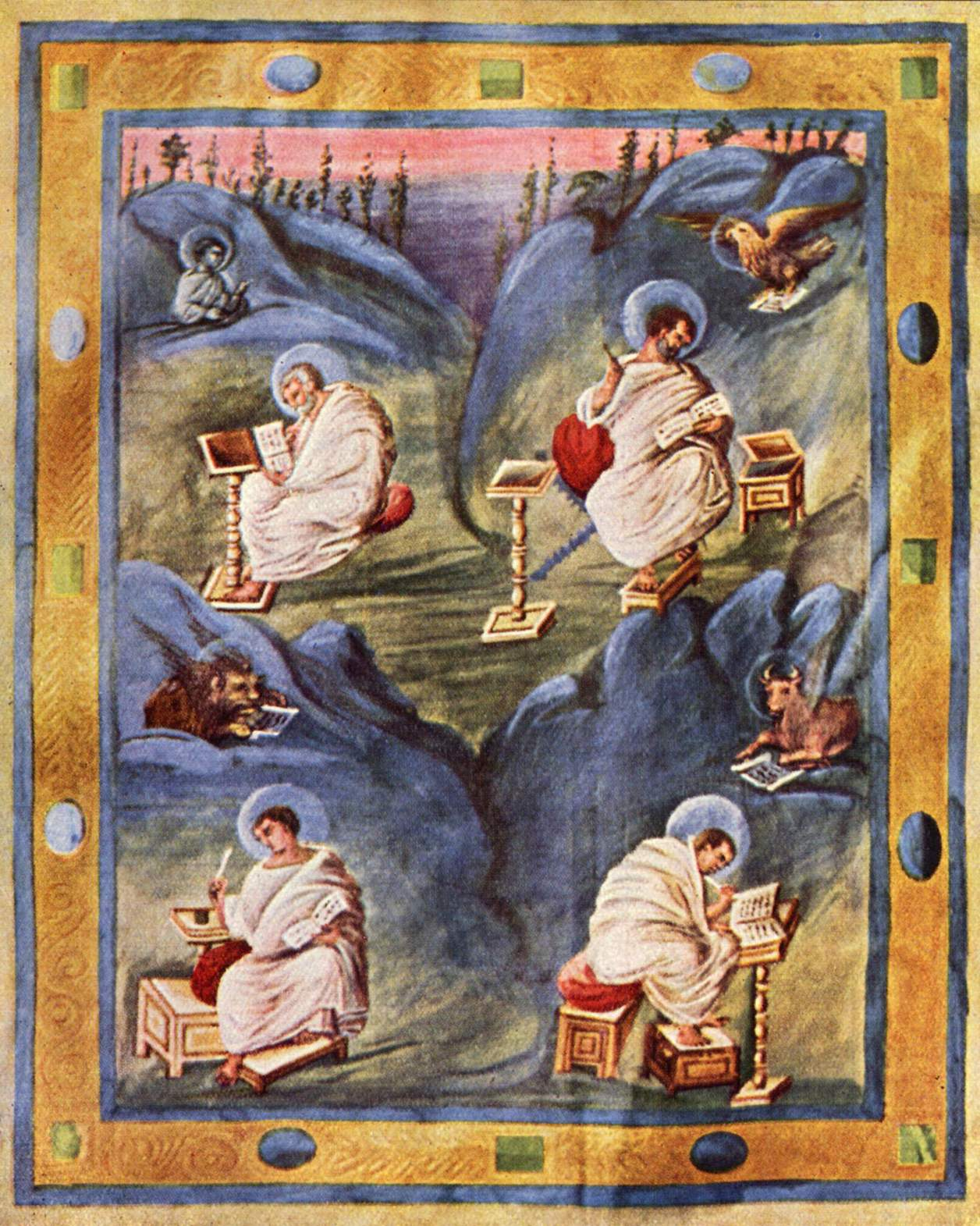
Carolingian depiction from an Aachen Gospel, 820
Illuminated Echternach Gospels, c. 690 (Bibliothèque nationale de France, Paris)

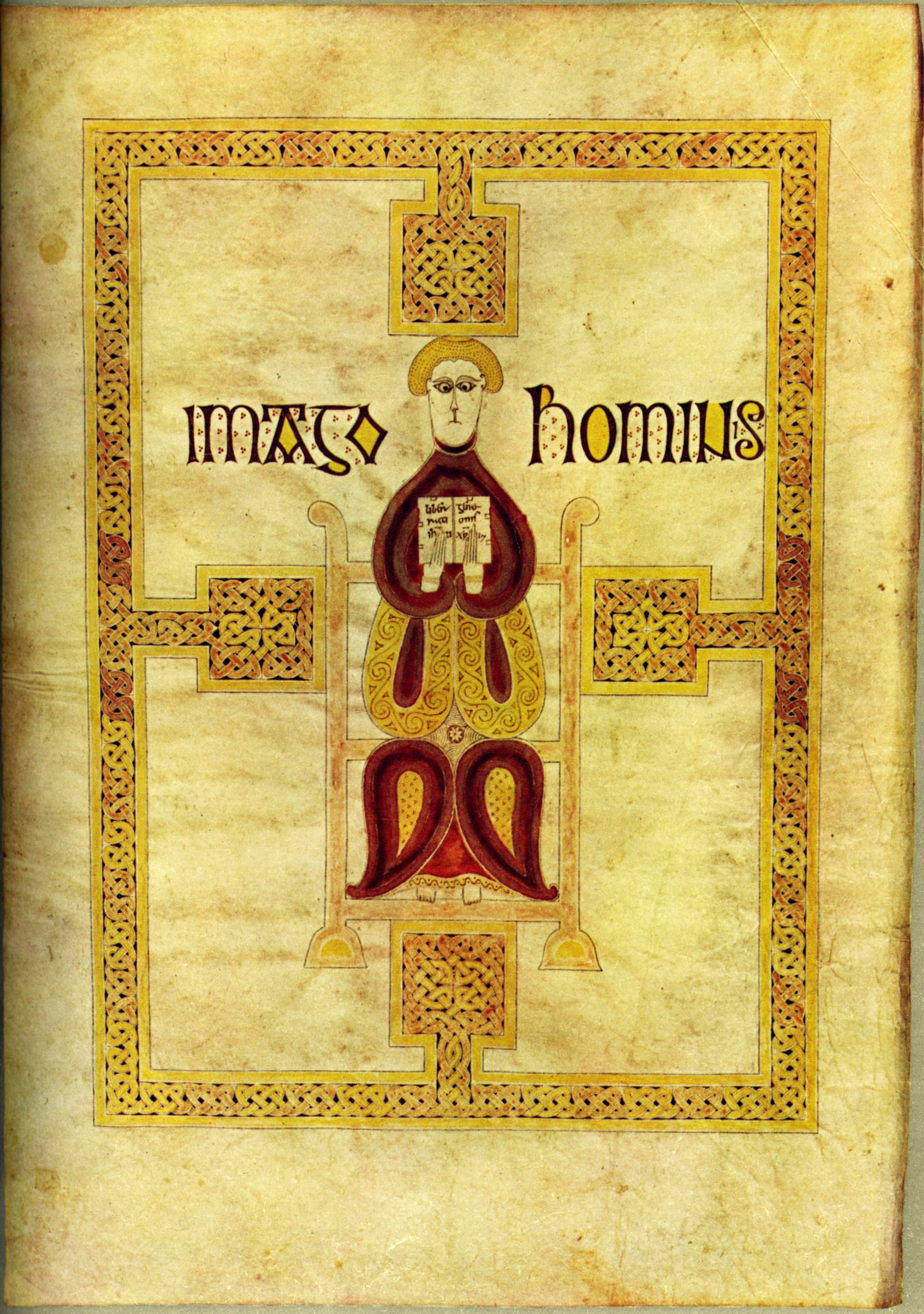
Saint Matthew:
the winged man or angel

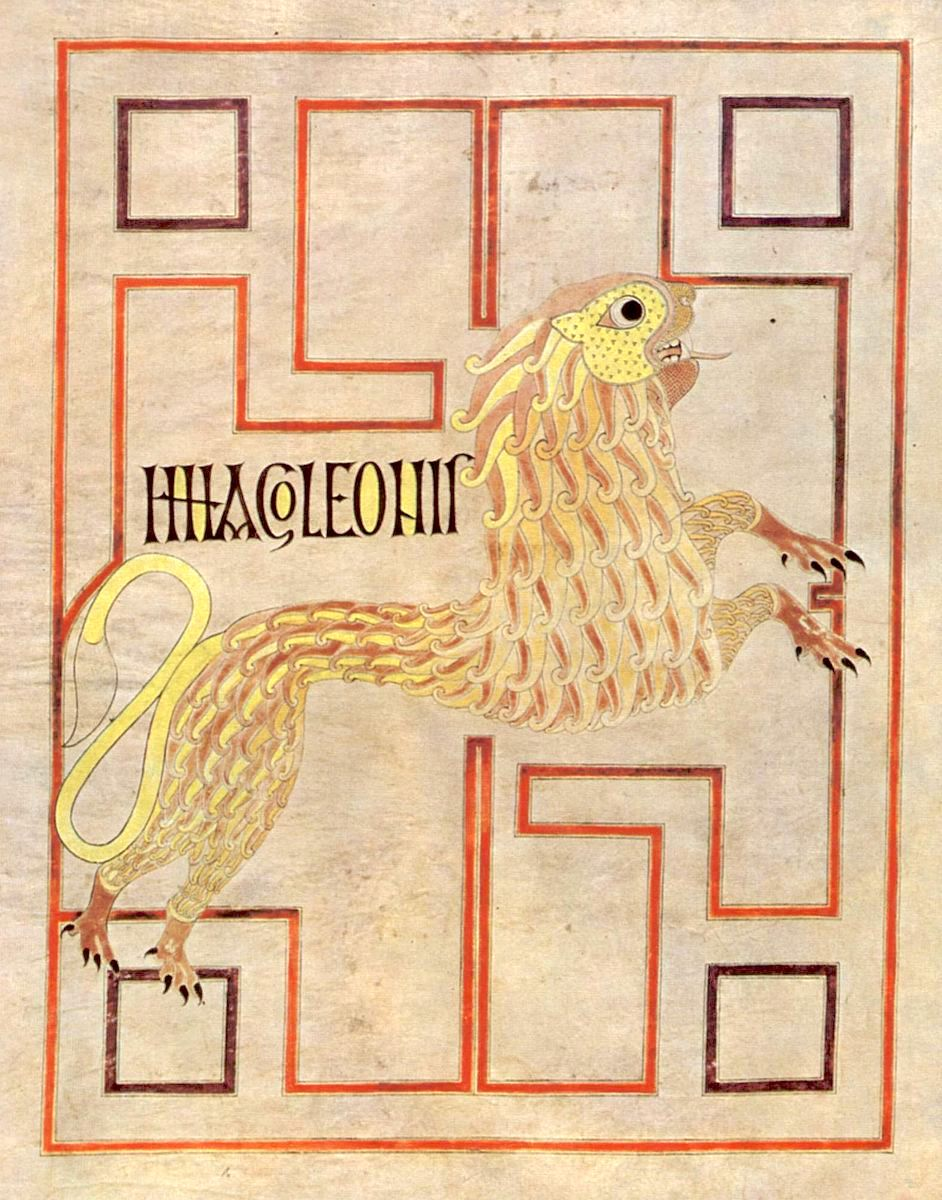
Saint Mark:
the lion
(in this case without wings)

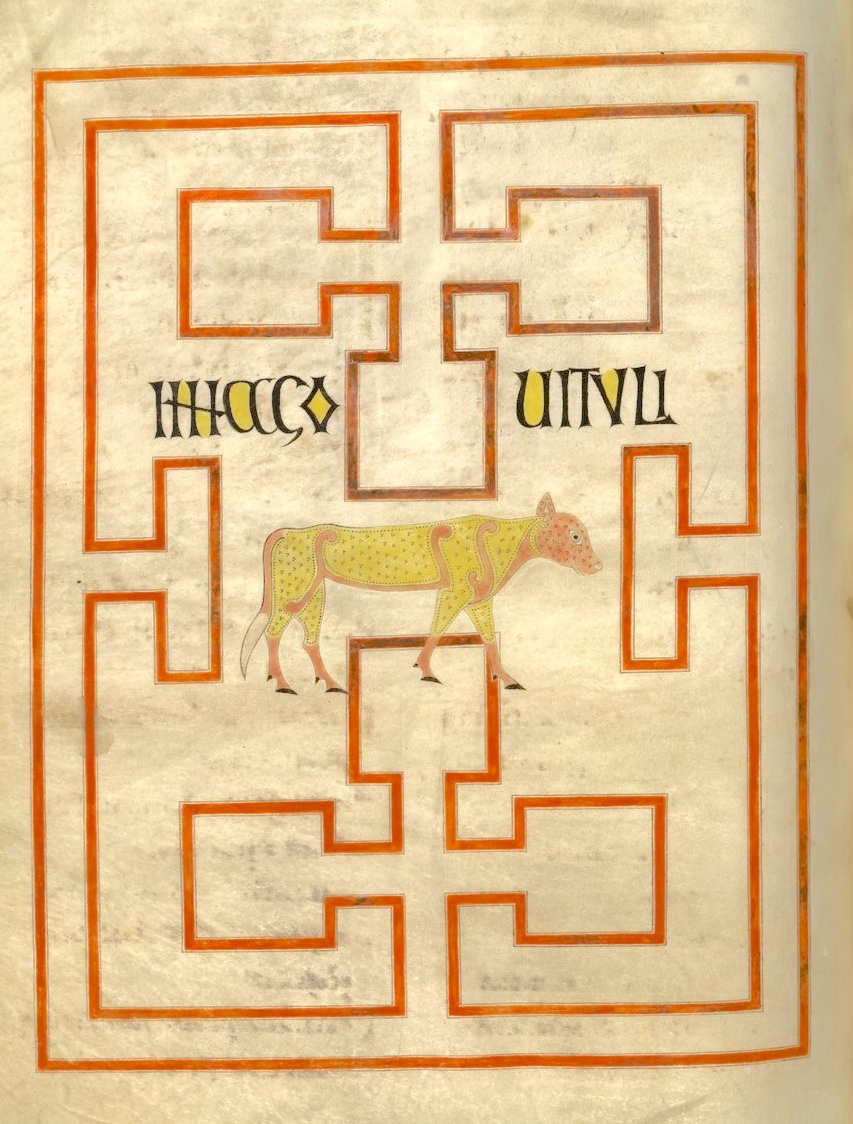
Saint Luke:
the ox or bull
(in this case without wings)

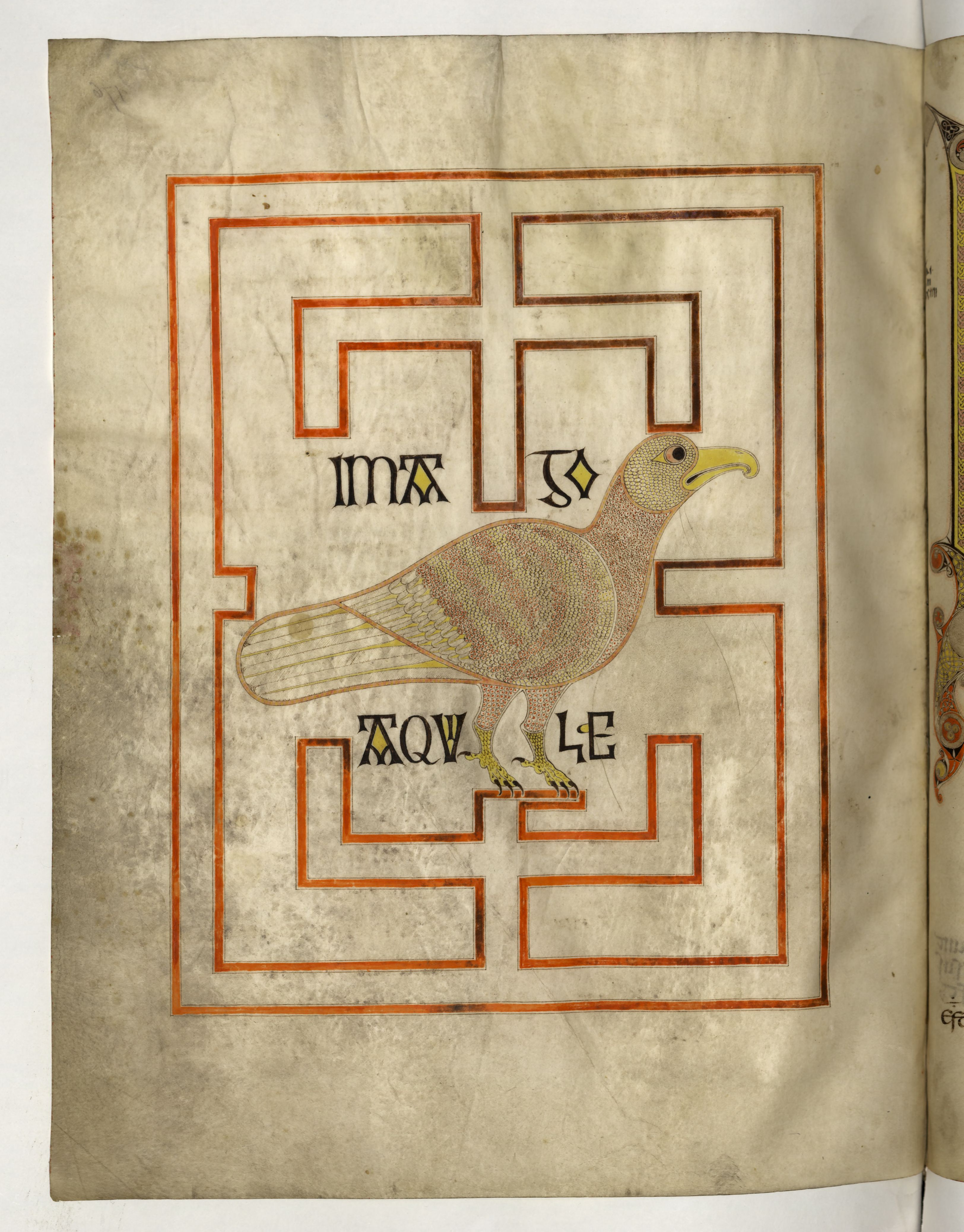
Saint John:
the eagle

Miniatures from the Grandes Heures of Anne of Brittany, Queen consort of France (1477–1514)

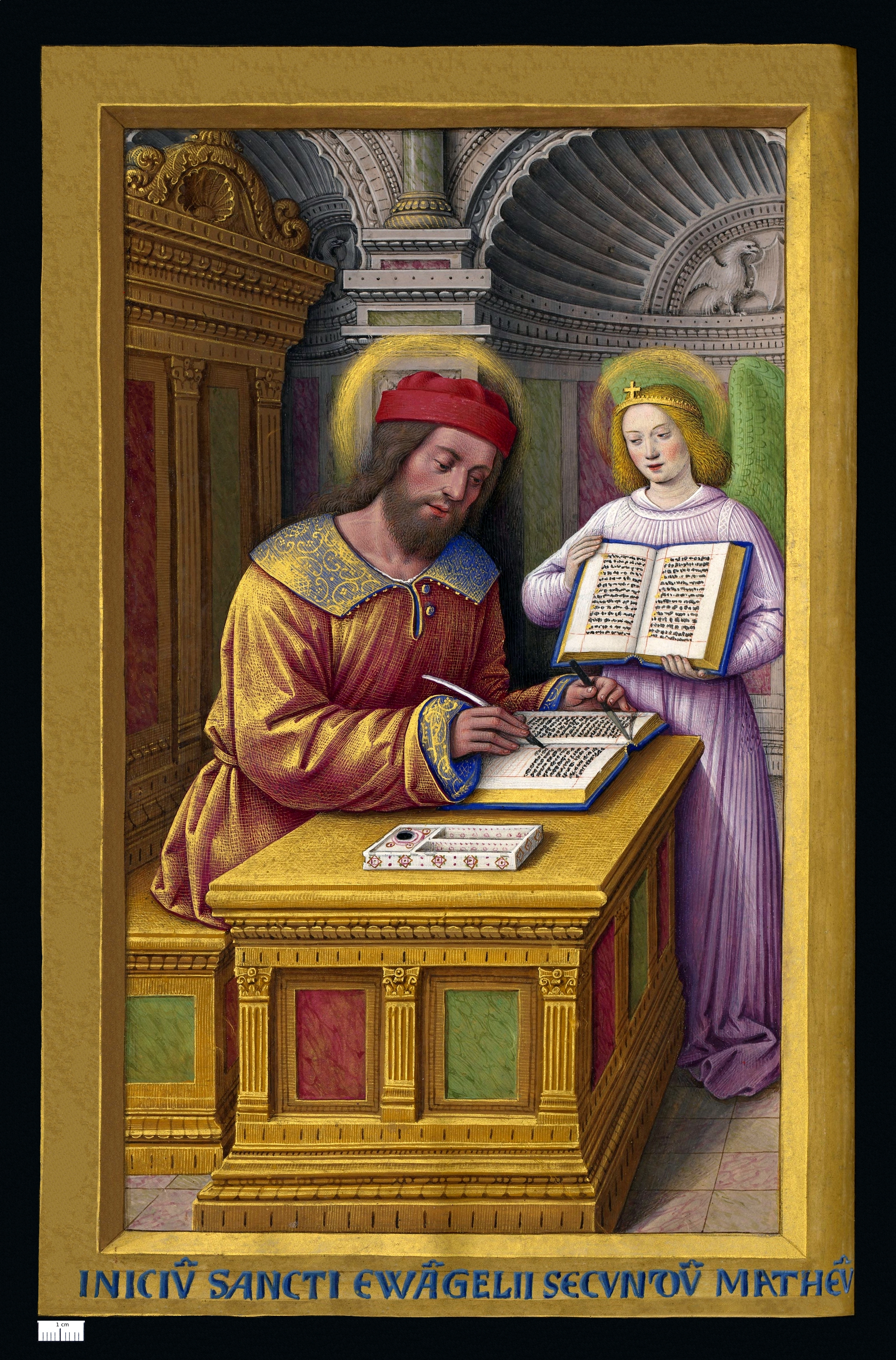
Saint Matthew

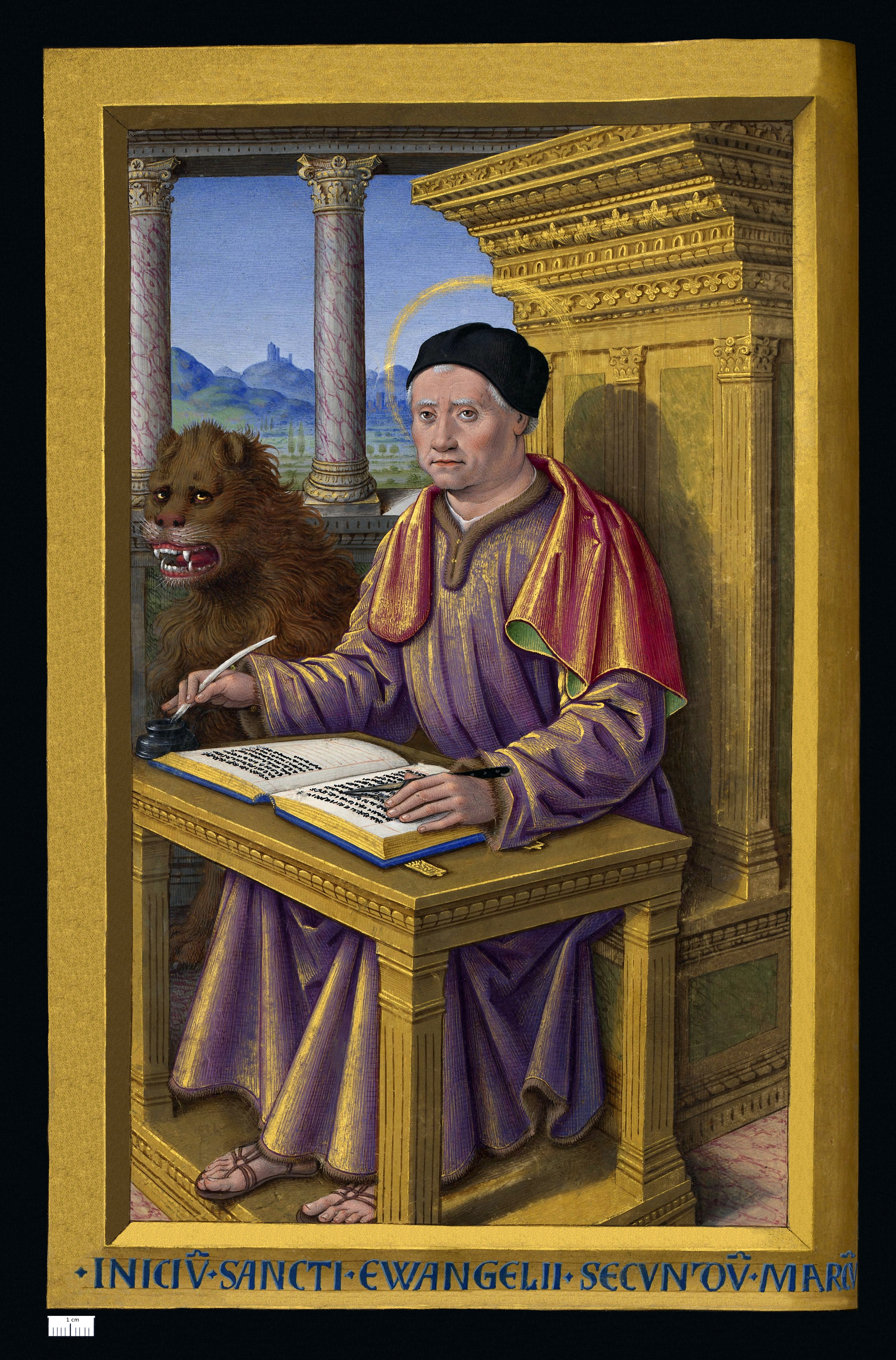
Saint Mark

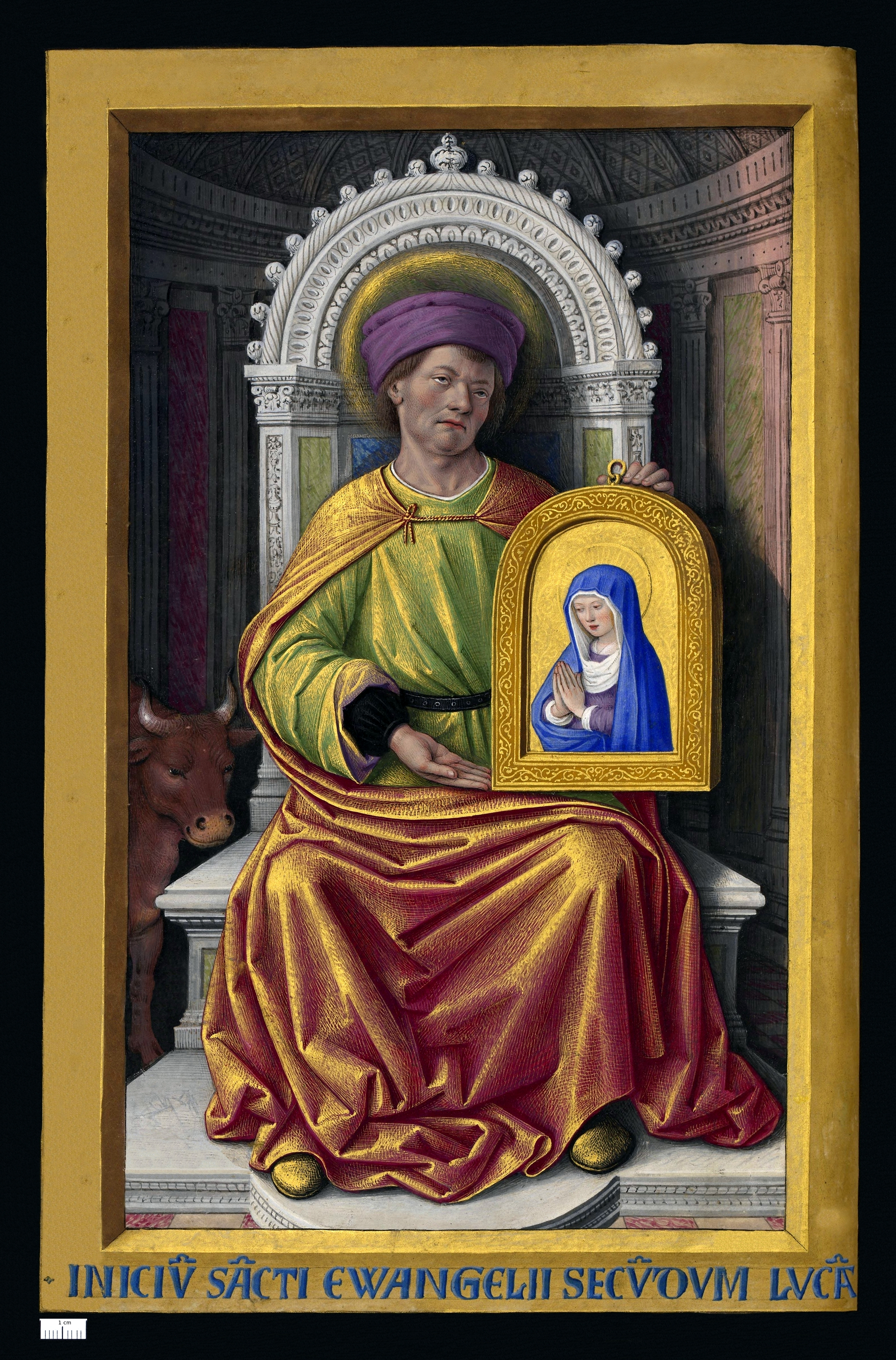
Saint Luke

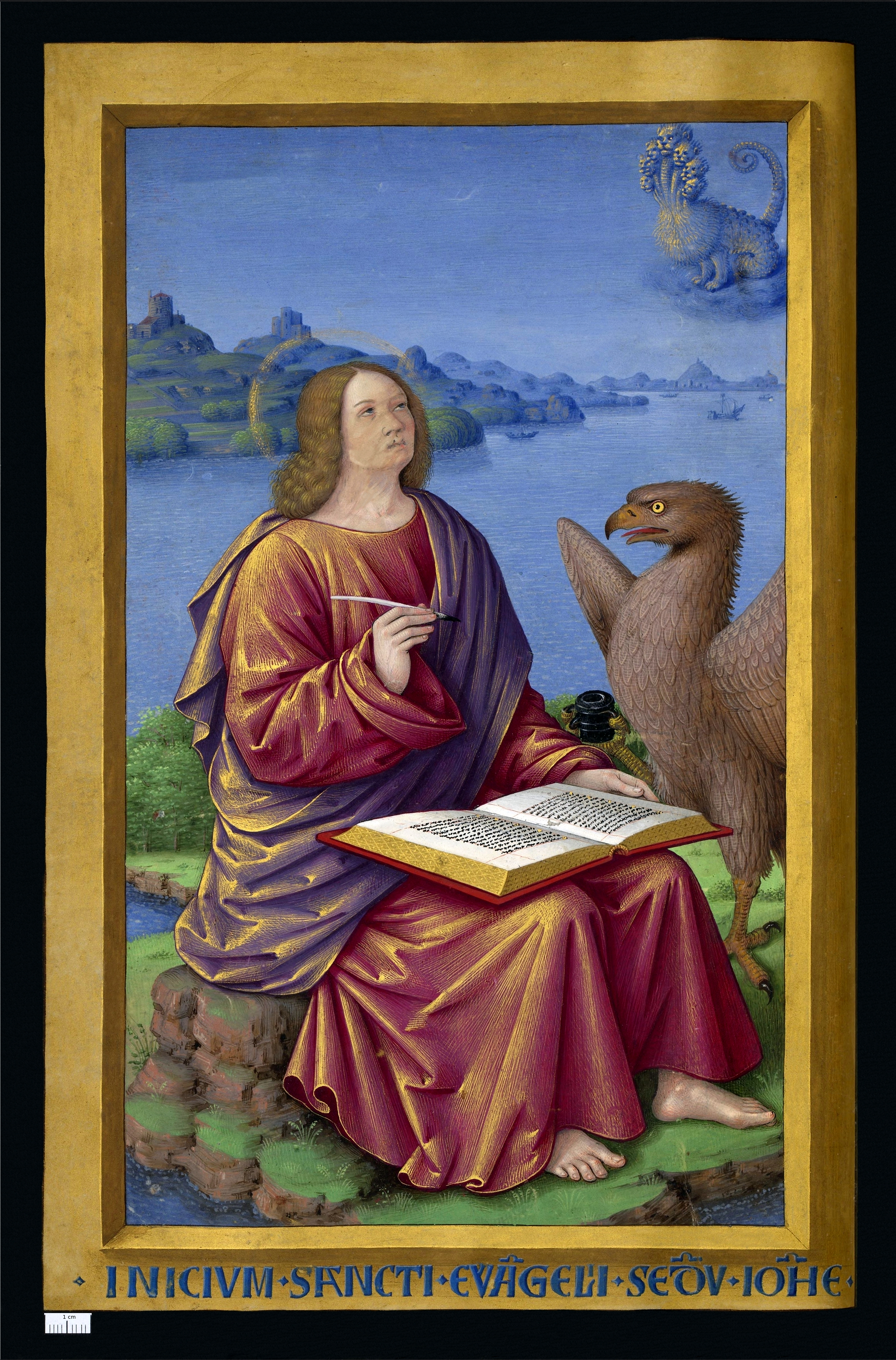
Saint John

The Four Evangelists, 10th century

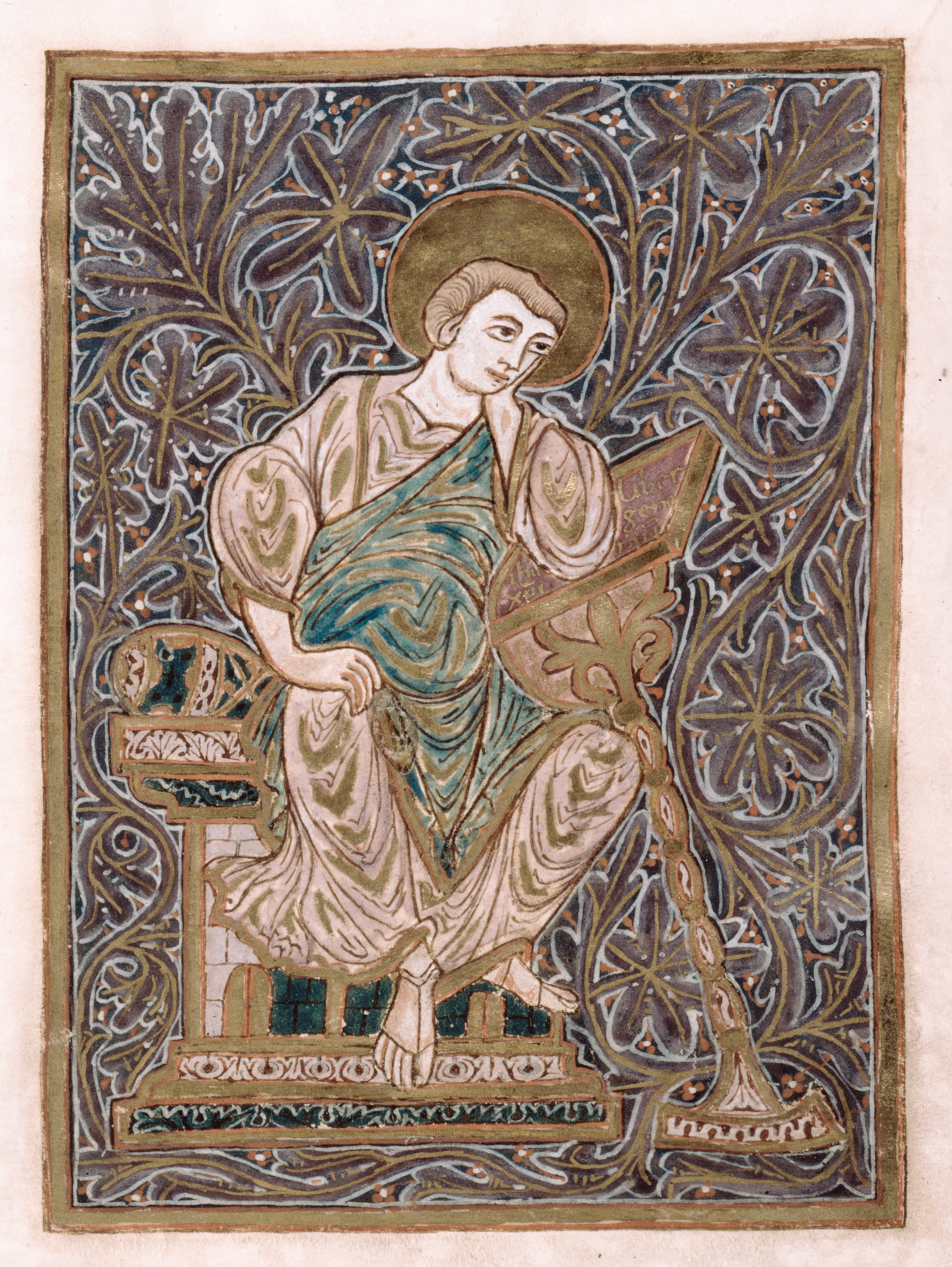
Saint Matthew

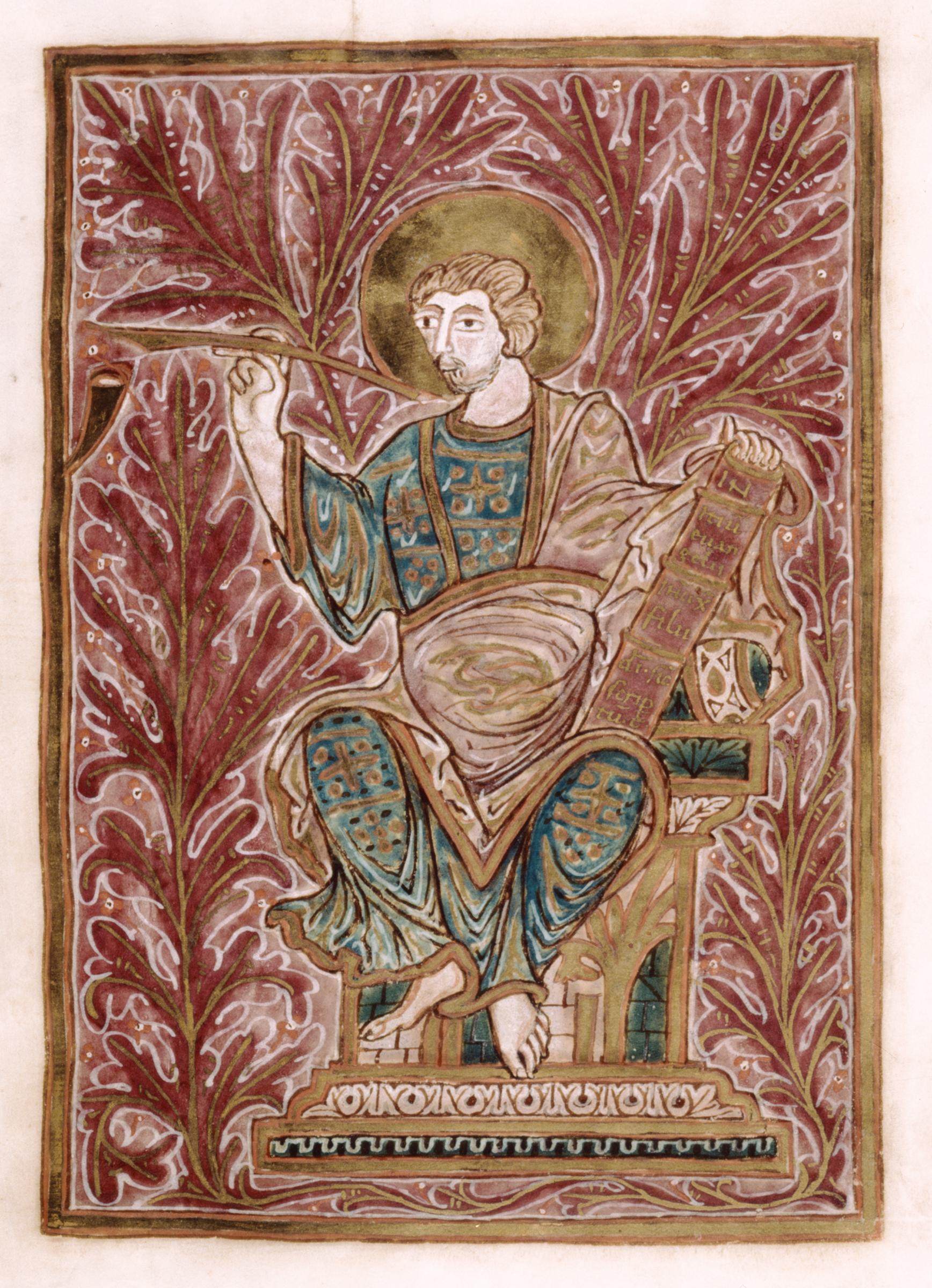
Saint Mark

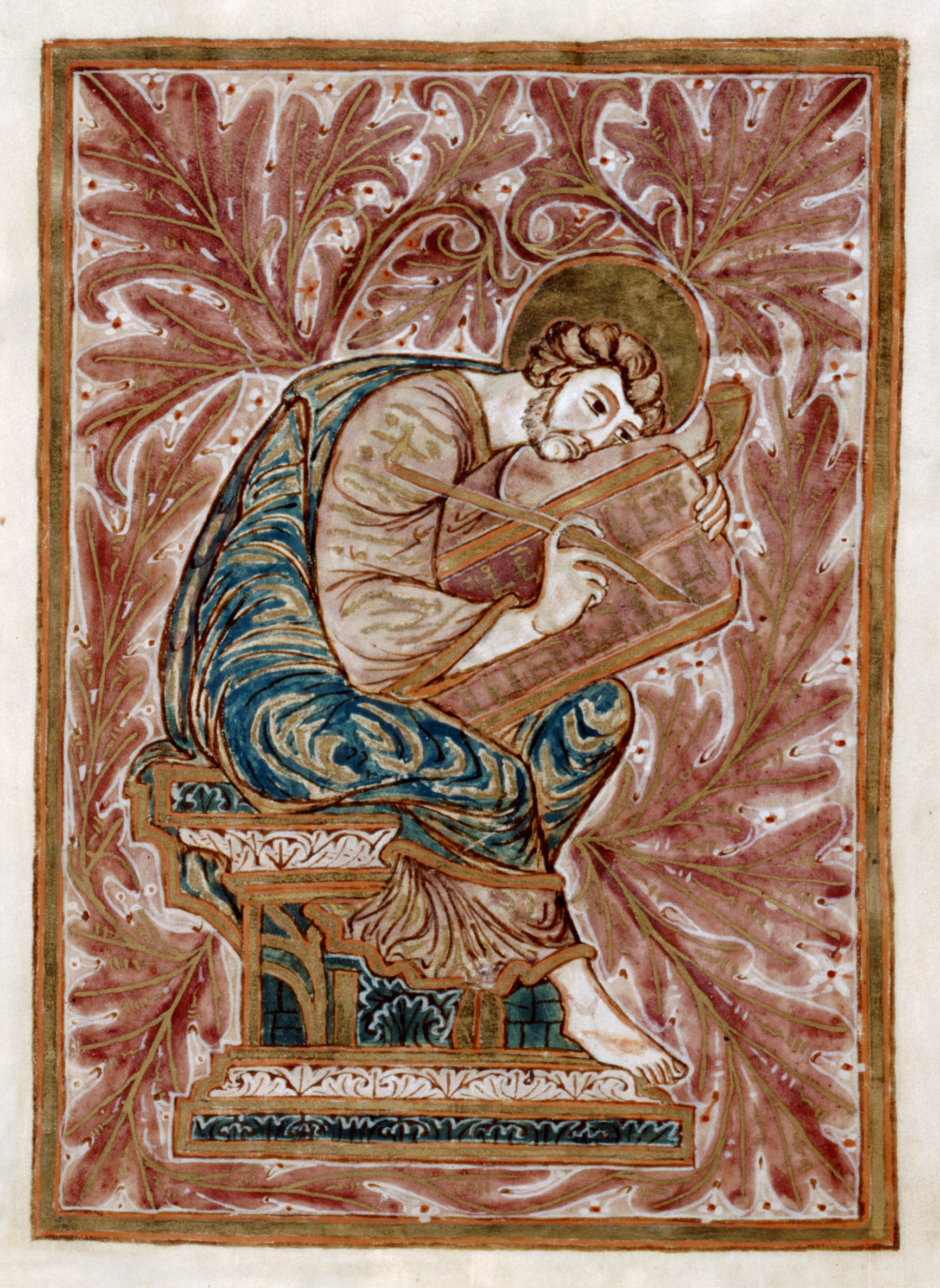
Saint Luke

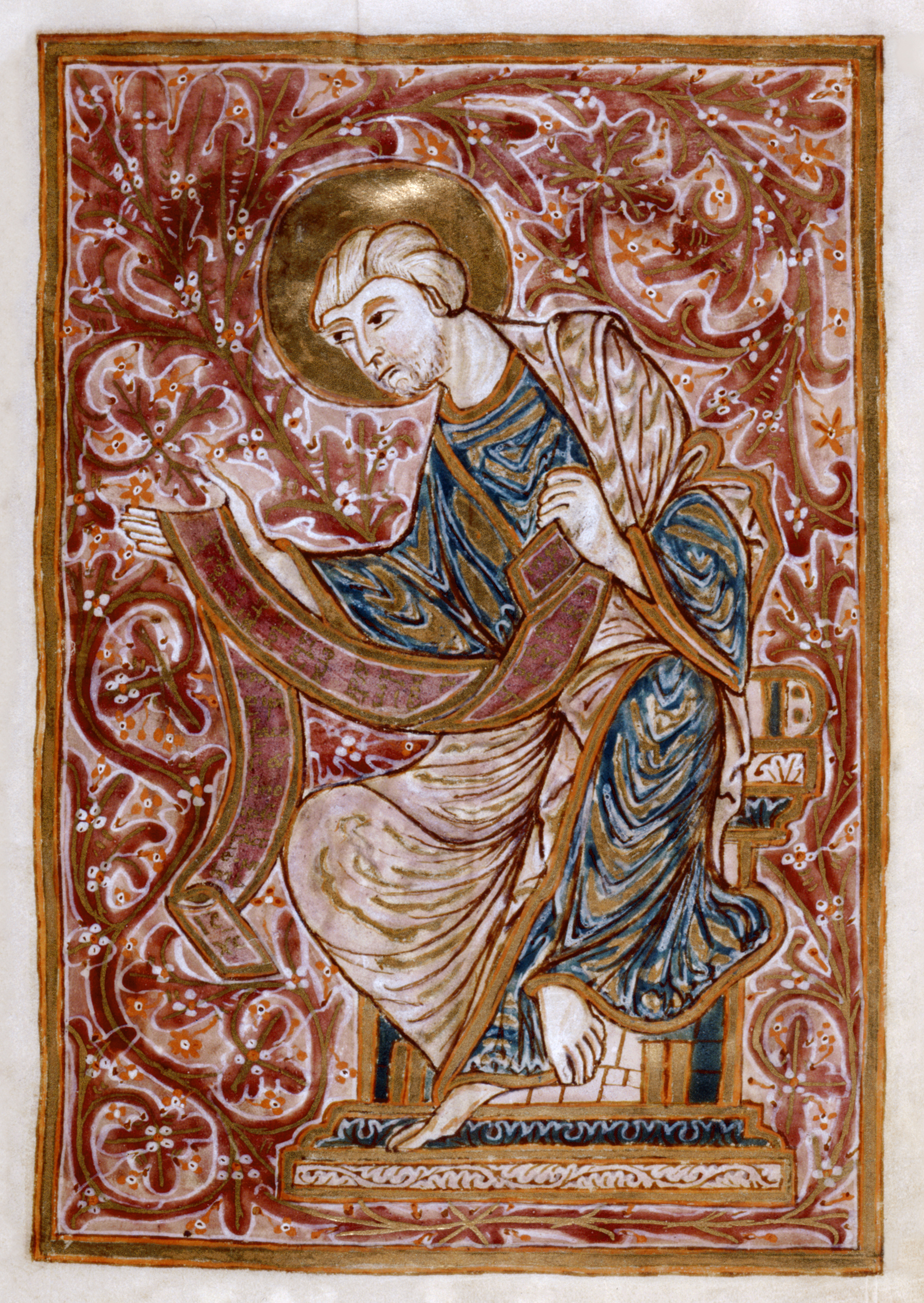
Saint John

== See also ==
- Authorship of the Johannine works
- Four Gospels
- Gospel
- Gospel harmony
- Tetramorph
