= The Four Evangelists (Jordaens) =

Painting by Jacob Jordaens

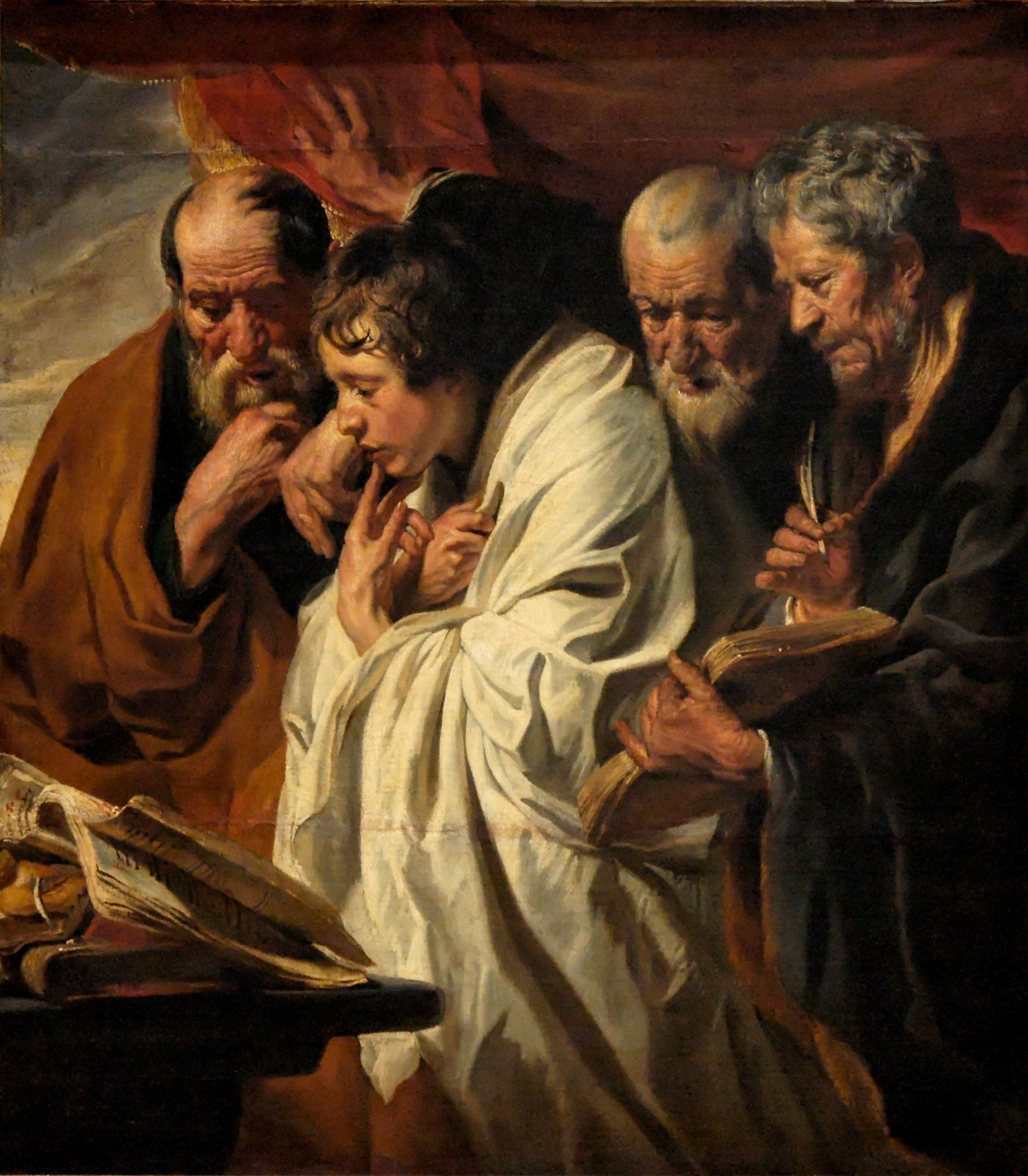
- Artist: Jacob Jordaens
- Year: 1625-1630
- Medium: Oil on canvas
- Movement: Flemish Baroque
- Dimensions: 133 cm × 118 cm (52 in × 46 in)
- Location: Louvre, Paris

The Four Evangelists is an oil-on-canvas painting by the Flemish Baroque artist Jacob Jordaens, which he is believed to have painted some time between 1625 and 1630. The painting measures 133 by 118 centimeters and is in the Louvre, Paris, France. It was formerly in the collections of the Dutch painter Pieter Lastman and the French King Louis XVI.

== Description ==
The canvas depicts the Four Evangelists, who in Jordaens' time where believed to be the authors of the Gospels. John is in his white robe, in the foreground, and Matthew is on the far right. He is writing his Gospel, but the angel who traditionally accompanies him is absent here. The other two Evangelists cannot be identified, due to a lack of attributes. A head study of Abraham Grapheus, keeper of the hall for the Antwerp Guild of Saint Luke has been used for the head of Saint Matthew.

All four evangelist stand erect, and are seen only from the knees upwards. Their eyes are fixed upon the book which lies open on a table. The four Evangelists are all lost in meditation and deliberation. Three of them are tanned by the sun and wrinkled as if by hard labour. They do not resemble intellectuals, but rather men who take their mission seriously, in the same way as earlier they had applied themselves to their trade. Saint Matthew is holding a book in his left hand and lifts a pen in his right hand as if he is about to write. A glimpse of sky shows in the background behind the red drapery which chiefly occupies it.

== Provenance ==
It is possibly the painting mentioned in the inventory of the estate of the painter Pieter Lastman (1583-1633). Lastman also made a copy of the work. Later the work passed to J. H. Fr. de Paule de Rigaud, count of Vaudreuil (1740-1817). It was sold on 25 November 1784 in Paris as lot 25 and acquired at this sale by A. J. Paillet, art dealer in Paris, for Louis XVI. It was exhibited at the opening of the Louvre Museum in 1793.
