= List of the Dead Sea Scrolls =

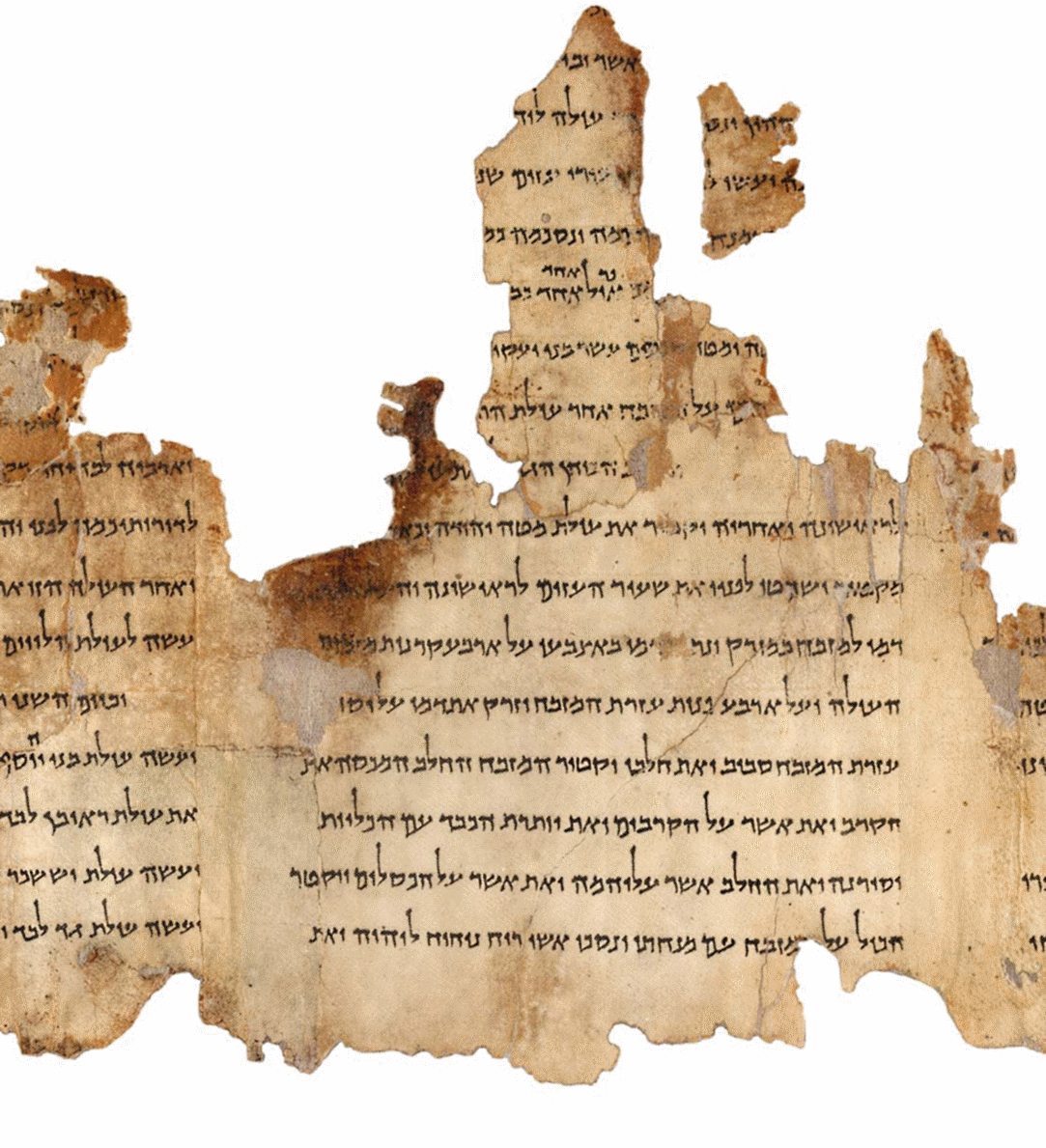
- A view of part of the Temple Scroll that was found in Qumran Cave 11.
- Material: Papyrus, Parchment, and Bronze
- Writing: Hebrew, Aramaic, Greek, and Nabataean
- Created: c. 408 BC - 318 AD or 250 BC - 115 AD
- Discovered: 1946/7–1956
- Present location: Various

The following is a list of the Dead Sea Scrolls from the caves near Qumran. The Dead Sea Scrolls are a collection of manuscripts discovered between 1946 and 1956 in the West Bank near the Dead Sea.

== List of manuscripts ==
The content of many scrolls hasn't been fully published. Some resources for more complete information on the scrolls are the book by Emanuel Tov, "Revised Lists of the Texts from the Judaean Desert" for a complete list of all of the Dead Sea Scroll texts, as well as the online webpages for the Shrine of the Book and the Leon Levy Collection, both of which present photographs and images of the scrolls and fragments themselves for closer study. Information is not always comprehensive, as content for many scrolls has not yet been fully published.

=== Qumran Cave 1 ===
Description

Wadi Qumran Cave 1 was discovered for the first time in 1946. The initial discovery, by Bedouin shepherd Muhammed edh-Dhib, his cousin Jum'a Muhammed, and Khalil Musa, took place between November 1946 and February 1947. The shepherds discovered seven scrolls housed in jars in a cave near what is now known as the Qumran site, and they took them back to the camp to show to their families. None of the scrolls were destroyed in this process. The original seven Dead Sea Scrolls from Cave 1 at Qumran are the Great Isaiah Scroll (1QIsa^{a}), a second copy of Isaiah (1QIsa^{b}), the Community Rule Scroll (1QS), the Pesher on Habakkuk (1QpHab), the War Scroll (1QM), the Thanksgiving Hymns (1QH), and the Genesis Apocryphon (1QapGen). One of the pottery jars containing the scrolls from Cave 1 is now kept in the British Museum.

Fragment or scroll identifier	Fragment or scroll name	Alternative identifier	English Bible Association	Language	Date/script	Description	Reference
Qumran Cave 1
1QIsa^{a}	Great Isaiah Scroll		Isaiah 1:1–31; 2:1–22; 3:1–5:30; 6:1–13; 7:1–25; 8:1–23; 9:1–20; 10:1–34; 11:1–45:25; 46:1–66:24	Hebrew	356–103 BCE/150–100 BCE	Contains all 66 chapters with occasional lacunae and some missing words at the bottom of some columns	
1QIsa^{b}	Isaiah	cf. 1Q8	The Book of Isaiah	Hebrew	Hasmonean/Herodian	A second copy of portions of the Book of Isaiah	
1QS	Serekh ha-Yahad or "Community Rule"			Hebrew		cf. 4QS^{a-j} = 4Q255–64, 5Q11	
1QpHab	Pesher on Habakkuk		Habakkuk 1–2	Hebrew	Later half of the 1st century BC	Commentary on Habakkuk 1:2–17; 2:1–20	
1QM	Milhamah or War Scroll			Hebrew		cf. 4Q491, 4Q493; 11Q14?	
1QH^{a}	Hodayot or Thanksgiving Hymns			Hebrew		Some parts are also preserved in 1QH^{b} and 4QH^{a-f}	
1QapGen	Genesis Apocryphon		Genesis 12:18–15:4	Aramaic	25 BCE–50 CE		
CTLevi	Cairo Geniza or Testament of Levi			Aramaic			
1QGen	Genesis	1Q1	Genesis 1:18–21; 3:11–14; 22:13–15; 23:17–19; 24:22–24	Hebrew	Herodian		
1QExod	Exodus	1Q2	Exodus 16:12–16; 19:24–20:2, 20:5–6; 20:25–21:1; 21:4–5	Hebrew	Hellenistic-Roman		
1QpaleoLev	Leviticus – Numbers	1Q3	Leviticus 11:10–11; 19:30–34; 20:20–24; 21:24–22:6; 23:4–8 and Numbers 1:48–50	Hebrew	Hellenistic-Roman; Palaeo-Hebrew script		
1QDeut^{a}	Deuteronomy	1Q4	Deuteronomy 1:22–25; 4:47–49; 8:18–19; 9:27–28; 11:27–30; 13:1–6, 13–14; 14:21, 24–25; 16:4, 6–7	Hebrew	Hellenistic-Roman		
1QDeut^{b}	Deuteronomy	1Q5	Deuteronomy 1:9–13; 8:8–9; 9:10; 11:30–31; 15:14–15; 17:16; 21:8–9; 24:10–16; 25:13–18; 28:44–48; 29:9–20; 30:19–20; 31:1–10, 12–13; 32:17–29; 33:12–24	Hebrew	Hellenistic-Roman		
1QJudg	Judges	1Q6	Judges 6:20–22; 8:1(?); 9:2–6, 28–31, 40–43, 48–49	Hebrew	Hellenistic-Roman		
1QSam	Samuel	1Q7	2 Samuel 18:17–18; 20:6–10; 21:16–18; 23:9–12	Hebrew	Hellenistic-Roman		
1QIsa^{b}	Isaiah	Parts of 1QIsa^{b} as 1Q8	Isaiah 7:22–25; 8:1; 10:17–19; 12:3–6; 13:1–8, 16–19; 15:3–9; 16:1–2, 7–11; 19:7–17, 20–25; 20:1; 22:11–18, 24–25; 23:1–4; 24:18–23; 25:1–8; 26:1–5; 28:15–20; 29:1–8; 30:10–14, 21–26; 35:4–5; 37:8–12; 38:12–22; 39:1–8; 40:2–3; 41:3–23; 43:1–13, 23–27; 44:21–28; 45:1–13; 46:3–13; 47:1–14; 48:17–22; 49:1–15; 50:7–11; 51:1–10; 52:7–15; 53:1–12; 54:1–6; 55:2–13; 56:1–12; 57:1–4, 17–21; 58:1–14; 59:1–8, 20–21; 60:1–22; 61:1–2; 62:2–12; 63:1–19; 64:1, 6–8; 65:17–25; 66:1–24	Hebrew	Herodian		
1QEzek	Ezekiel	Parts of 1QIsa^{b} as 1Q9	Ezekiel 4:16–17; 5:1	Hebrew	Hellenistic-Roman		
1QPs^{a}	Psalms	1Q10	Psalm 86:5–8; 92:12–14; 94:16; 95:11–96:2; 119:31–34, 43–48, 77–79	Hebrew	Hellenistic-Roman		
1QPs^{b}	Psalms	1Q11	Psalm 126:6; 127:1–5; 128:3	Hebrew	Hellenistic-Roman		
1QPs^{c}	Psalms	1Q12	Psalm 44:3–5, 7, 9, 23–25	Hebrew	Herodian		
1QPhyl	Phylactery	1Q13	Deuteronomy 5:23–27; 11:8–11	Hebrew	Hellenistic-Roman	58 fragments from a Phylactery	
1QpMic	Pesher on Micah	1Q14		Hebrew	Herodian		
1QpZeph	Pesher on Zephaniah	1Q15		Hebrew	Hellenistic-Roman		
1QpPs	Pesher on Psalms	1Q16		Hebrew	Hellenistic-Roman		
1QJub^{a}	Jubilees	1Q17		Hebrew	Hellenistic-Roman	Jubilees	
1QJub^{b}	Jubilees	1Q18		Hebrew	Hasmonean	Jubilees	
1QNoah	Book of Noah	1Q19		Hebrew	Herodian	Parts of the lost Book of Noah	
1QapGen	Fragments of the "Genesis Apocryphon"	1Q20		Aramaic	Herodian		
1QTLevi / 1QALD	Testament of Levi	1Q21		Aramaic	Hasmonean	Aramaic Levi Document	
1QDM	"Dibrê Moshe" or "Words of Moses"	1Q22		Hebrew	Hellenistic-Roman		
1QEnGiants^{a}	Book of Giants	1Q23		Aramaic	Hasmonean	Enoch	
1QEnGiants^{b}	Book of Giants	1Q24		Aramaic	Hellenistic-Roman	Enoch	
1Q Apocr.Prophecy	"Apocryphal Prophecy"	1Q25		Hebrew	Herodian		
1Q Instruction	"Instruction"	1Q26		Hebrew	Hasmonean		
1QMyst	"The Book of Mysteries"	1Q27		Hebrew	Hellenistic-Roman		
1QS or 1QS^{a}	"Rule of the Congregation"	1Q28 (1Q28a)		Hebrew	Hasmonean	Fragment from "Community Rule"	
1QS^{b}	"Rule of the Blessing" or "Rule of the Benedictions"	1Q28b		Hebrew	Hasmonean	Fragment from "Community Rule"	
1QapocrMoses B	Apocryphon of Moses	1Q29		Hebrew	Hellenistic-Roman	"Liturgy of the Three Tongues of Fire"	
1Q Liturgical Text(?) A	"Liturgical Text 1"	1Q30		Hebrew	Hellenistic-Roman		
1Q Liturgical Text(?) B	"Liturgical Text 2"	1Q31		Hebrew	Hellenistic-Roman		
1QNJ(?)	"New Jerusalem"	1Q32		Aramaic	Herodian	cf. 11Q18	
1QM	Fragment of the 1QM or "War Scroll" or "Milhamah"	1Q33	Deuteronomy 20:2–5; Numbers 10:9, 24:17–19; Isaiah 31:8	Hebrew	30–1 BCE Early Herodian		
1QPrFetes / 1QLitPr	"Liturgical Prayers" or "Festival Prayers"	1Q34		Hebrew	Herodian		
1QH^{b}	"Hodayot" or "Thanksgiving Hymns"	1Q35		Hebrew	Herodian		
1Q Hymns	"Hymns"	1Q36		Hebrew	Hellenistic-Roman		
1Q Hymnic Composition(?)	"Hymnic Composition"	1Q37		Hebrew	Herodian		
1Q Hymnic Composition(?)	"Hymnic Composition"	1Q38		Hebrew	Hellenistic-Roman		
1Q Hymnic Composition(?)	"Hymnic Composition"	1Q39		Hebrew	Herodian		
1Q Hymnic Composition(?)	"Hymnic Composition"	1Q40		Hebrew	Hellenistic-Roman		
1Q41–70		1Q41–70		Hebrew		Unclassified Fragments	
1QDan^{a}	Daniel	1Q71	Daniel 1:10–17; 2:2–6	Hebrew	Hellenistic-Roman		
1QDan^{b}	Daniel	1Q72	Daniel 3:22–30	Aramaic	Hellenistic-Roman		

=== Qumran Cave 2 ===
Description

Wadi Qumran Cave 2 was discovered in February 1952 and soon the Bedouin people discovered 30 fragments in it. The cave eventually yielded 300 fragments from 33 manuscripts of Dead Sea Scrolls, including fragments of Jubilees and the Wisdom of Sirach written in Hebrew.

Fragment or scroll identifier	Fragment or scroll name	Alternative identifier	English Bible Association	Language	Date/script	Description	Reference
Qumran Cave 2
2QGen	Genesis	2Q1	Genesis 19:27–28; 36:6, 35–37	Hebrew	Herodian		
2QExod^{a}	Exodus	2Q2	Exodus 1:11–14; 7:1–4; 9:27–29; 11:3–7; 12:32–41; 21:18–20(?); 26:11–13; 30:21(?), 23–25; 32:32–34	Hebrew	Herodian		
2QExod^{b}	Exodus	2Q3	Exodus 4:31; 12:26–27(?); 18:21–22; 21:37–22:2, 15–19; 27:17–19; 31:16–17; 19:9; 34:10	Hebrew	Herodian		
2QExod^{c}	Exodus	2Q4	Exodus 5:3–5	Hebrew	Hellenistic-Roman		
2QpaleoLev	Leviticus	2Q5	Leviticus 11:22–29	Hebrew	Hasmonean; Palaeo-Hebrew script		
2QNum^{a}	Numbers	2Q6	Numbers 3:38–41, 51– 4:3	Hebrew	Herodian		
2QNum^{b}	Numbers	2Q7	Numbers 33:47–53	Hebrew	Herodian		
2QNum^{c}	Numbers	2Q8	Numbers 7:88	Hebrew	Herodian		
2QNum^{d?}	Numbers	2Q9	Numbers 18:8–9	Hebrew	Hellenistic-Roman	This fragment may belong to 2Q7; possibly = Leviticus 23:1–3	
2QDeut^{a}	Deuteronomy	2Q10	Deuteronomy 1:7–9	Hebrew	50–25 BCE Late Hasmonean or Early Herodian		
2QDeut^{b}	Deuteronomy	2Q11	Deuteronomy 17:12–15	Hebrew	30 BCE – 68 CE Herodian		
2QDeut^{c}	Deuteronomy	2Q12	Deuteronomy 10:8–12	Hebrew	1–68 CE Late Herodian		
2QJer	Jeremiah	2Q13	Jeremiah 42:7–11, 14; 43:8–11; 44:1–3, 12–14; 46:27–47:7; 48:7, 25–39, 43–45; 49:10	Hebrew	Herodian	Doubtfully identified fragments: 13:22; 32:24–25; 48:2–4, 41–42	
2QPs	Psalms	2Q14	Psalm 103:2–11; 104:6–11	Hebrew	Herodian		
2QJob	Job	2Q15	Job 33:28–30	Hebrew	Herodian		
2QRuth^{a}	Ruth	2Q16	Ruth 2:13–23; 3:1–8; 4:3–4	Hebrew	Herodian		
2QRuth^{b}	Ruth	2Q17	Ruth 3:13–18	Hebrew	Hasmonean		
2QSir	"Wisdom of Sirach" or "Ecclesiasticus"	2Q18	Sir 6:14–15 (or 1:19–20); 6:20–31	Hebrew	Herodian	Ben Sira	
2QJub^{a}	Book of Jubilees	2Q19	Genesis 25:7–9	Hebrew	Herodian	Jub 23:7–8	
2QJub^{b}	Book of Jubilees	2Q20	Exodus 1:7; Genesis 50:26, 22 (different order)	Hebrew	Herodian	Jub 46:1–3	
2QapMoses /2QapocrMoses(?)	"Apocryphon of Moses"	2Q21		Hebrew	Herodian	Apocryphal writing about Moses	
2QapDavid /2QapocrDavid	"Apocryphon of David"	2Q22		Hebrew	Herodian	Apocryphal writing about David	
2QapProph /2Qapocr.Prophecy	"Apocryphal Prophecy"	2Q23		Hebrew	Herodian	Apocryphal prophetic text in six tiny fragments.	
2QNJ	"New Jerusalem"	2Q24		Aramaic	Herodian	Description of the New Jerusalem. cf. 1Q32 ar, 11Q18 ar	
2Q Juridical Text	"Juridical Text"	2Q25		Hebrew	Herodian	A juridical text	
2QEnGiants	"Book of Giants" from "Enoch"	2Q26		Aramaic	Herodian	Now known as part of the "Book of Giants". cf. 6Q8	
2Q27 2Q28 2Q29 2Q30 2Q31 2Q32 2Q33		2Q27 2Q28 2Q29 2Q30 2Q31 2Q32 2Q33				Unidentified Texts	
2QX1		2QX1				Debris in a box	

=== Qumran Cave 3 ===
Description

Wadi Qumran Cave 3 was discovered on 14 March 1952 by the ASOR team. The cave initially yielded fragments of Jubilees and the Copper Scroll.

Fragment or scroll identifier	Fragment or scroll name	Alternative identifier	English Bible Association	Language	Date/script	Description	Reference
Qumran Cave 3
3QEzek	Ezekiel	3Q1	Ezekiel 16:31–33	Hebrew	Herodian		
3QPs	Psalms	3Q2	Psalm 2:6–7	Hebrew	Herodian		
3QLam	Lamentations	3Q3	Lamentations 1:10–12; 3:53–62	Hebrew	Herodian		
3QpIsa	Pesher on Isaiah	3Q4	Isaiah 1:1	Hebrew	Herodian		
3QJub	Jubilees	3Q5		Hebrew	Herodian	Jubilees 23:6–7, 12–13, 23	
3QHymn	Unidentified Hymn	3Q6		Hebrew	Herodian	Hymn of Praise	
3QTJud(?)	Testament of Judah(?)	3Q7		Hebrew	Herodian	cf. 4Q484, 4Q538	
3Q Text Mentioning Angel of Peace		3Q8		Hebrew	Herodian	Text about an Angel of Peace	
3QSectarian text		3Q9		Hebrew	Herodian	Possible unidentified Sectarian text	
3QUnc	Unidentified	3Q10 3Q11		Hebrew	Hellenistic-Roman	Unclassified fragments	
3QUncA-B	Unclassified fragments	3Q12 3Q13		Aramaic	Hellenistic-Roman	Unclassified fragments	
3QUncC	Unidentified	3Q14		Hebrew?	Hellenistic-Roman	21 unclassified fragments	
3QCopScr	The Copper Scroll	3Q15		Hebrew	Roman	Copper plaque mentioning buried treasures	

=== Qumran Cave 4 ===
Description

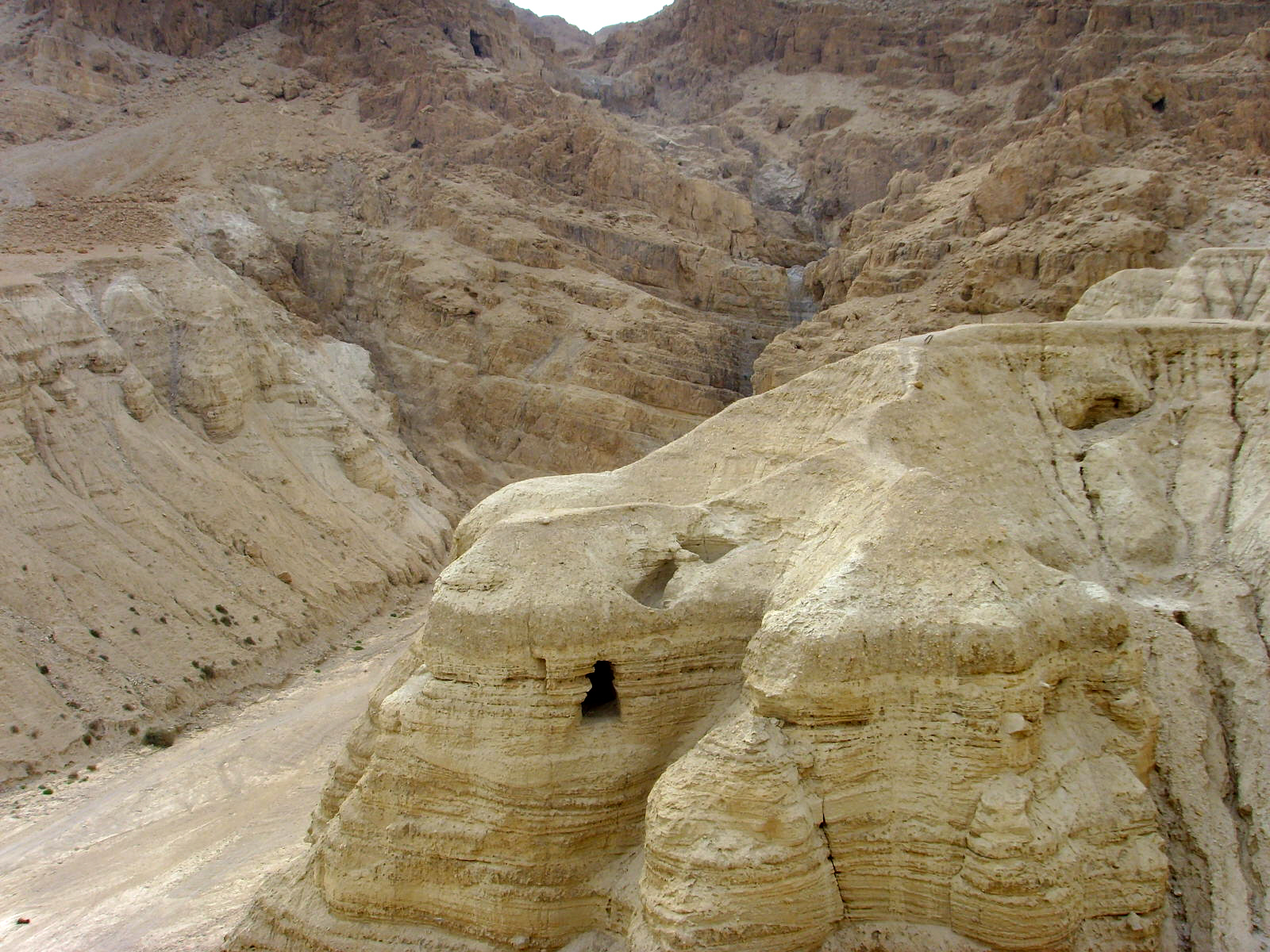
Qumran Cave 4, where ninety percent of the scrolls were found.

Wadi Qumran Cave 4 was discovered in August 1952, and was excavated from 22–29 September 1952 by Gerald Lankester Harding, Roland de Vaux, and Józef Milik. Cave 4 is actually two hand-cut caves (4a and 4b), but since the fragments were mixed, they are labeled as 4Q. Cave 4 is the most famous of Qumran Caves both because of its visibility from the Qumran plateau and its productivity. It is visible from the plateau to the south of the Qumran settlement. It is by far the most productive of all Qumran Caves, producing ninety percent of the Dead Sea Scrolls and scroll fragments (approx. 15,000 fragments from 500 different texts), including 9–10 copies of Jubilees, along with 21 tefillin and 7 mezuzot.

4Q1–4Q100

Fragment or scroll identifier	Fragment or scroll name	Alternative identifier	English Bible Association	Language	Date/script	Description	Reference
Qumran Cave 4
4QGen-Exod^{a}	Genesis–Exodus	4Q1	Genesis 8:20–21; Exodus 1–4; 5:3–17; 6:4–21,25; 7:5–13,15–20; 8:20–22; 9:8; 22:14; 27:38–39,42–43; 34:17–21	Hebrew	Hasmonean	Fragments from Genesis to Numbers	
4QGen^{b}	Genesis	4Q2	Genesis 1:1–27; 2:14–19; 4:2–4; 5:13	Hebrew	Roman	Fragment of Genesis	
4QGen^{c}	Genesis	4Q3	Genesis 40–41	Hebrew	Herodian	Fragments of Genesis	
4QGen^{d}	Genesis	4Q4	Genesis 1:18–27	Hebrew	Hasmonean	Fragments of Genesis on the Beginning of Creation	
4QGen^{e}	Genesis	4Q5	Genesis 36–37; 40–43; 49	Hebrew	Herodian	Fragments of Genesis	
4QGen^{f}	Genesis	4Q6	Genesis 48:1–11	Hebrew	Hasmonean	Fragments of Genesis	
4QGen^{g}	Genesis	4Q7	Genesis 1:1–11,13–22; 2:6–7	Hebrew	Hasmonean	Fragments of Genesis about Creation	
4QGen^{h}/4QGen^{h1}	Genesis	4Q8	Genesis 1:8–10	Hebrew	Herodian	Fragments of Genesis about the beginning to early mankind.	
4QGen^{h2}	Genesis	4Q8a	Genesis 2:17–18	Hebrew	Herodian	Fragments of Genesis about the beginning to early mankind.	
4QGen^{h-para}	Genesis	4Q8b	Genesis 12:4–5	Hebrew	Herodian	A paraphrase of Genesis	
4QGen^{h-title}	Genesis	4Q8c	Genesis	Hebrew	Herodian	The title of a Genesis manuscript	
4QGen^{j}	Genesis	4Q9	Genesis 41–43; 45	Hebrew	Herodian	Fragments of Genesis	
4QGen^{k}	Genesis	4Q10	Genesis 1:9,14–16,27–28; 2:1–3; 3:1–2	Hebrew	Herodian	Fragments of Genesis	
4QpaleoGen-Exod^{l}	Paleo-Genesis/Exodus	4Q11	Genesis 50:26; Exodus 1:1–5; 2:10,22–25; 3:1–4,17–21; 8:13–15, 19–21; 9:25–29, 33–35; 10:1–5; 11:4–10; 12:1–11, 42–46; 14:15–24; 16:2–7, 13–14,18–20,23–25,26–31,33–35; 17:1–3,5–11; 18:17–24; 19:24–25; 20:1–2; 22:23–24; 23:5–16; 25:7–20; 26:29–37; 27:1, 6–14; 28:33–35,40–42; 36:34–36	Hebrew	Hasmonean; Paleo-Hebrew script	Fragments of Genesis and Exodus	
4QpaleoGen^{m}	Paleo-Genesis	4Q12	Genesis 26:21–28; Exodus 6:25–30; 7:1–19,29; 8:1,5,12–26; 9:5–16,19–21,35; 10:1–12,19–28; 11:8–10; 12:1–2,6–8,13–15,17–22,31–32,34–39; 13:3–7,12–13; 14:3–5,8–9,25–26; 15:23–27; 16:1,4–5,7–8,31–35; 17:1–16; 18:1–27; 19:1,7–17,23–25; 20:1,18–19; 21:5–6, 13–14,22–32; 22:3–4,6–7,11–13,16–30; 23:15–16,19–31; 24:1–4,6–11; 25:11–12,20–29,31–34; 26:8,15,21–30; 27:1–3,9–14,18–19; 28:3–4,8–12,22–24,26–28,30–43; 29:1–5,20,22–25,31–41; 30:10,12–18,29–31,34–38; 31:1–8,13–15; 32:2–19,25–30; 33:12–23; 34:1–3,10–13,15–18,20–24,27–28; 35:1; 36:21–24; 37:9–16	Hebrew	Hasmonean; Paleo-Hebrew script	Fragment from Genesis	
4QExod^{b}	Exodus	4Q13	Exodus 1:1–6,16–12; 2:2–18; 3:13 – 4:8; 5:3–14	Hebrew	Herodian	Fragments of Exodus about Slavery in Egypt	
4QExod^{c}	Exodus	4Q14	Exodus 7:17–19,20–23; 7:26 – 8:1; 8:5–14,16–18,22; 9:10–11,15–20,22–25,27–35; 10:1–5,7–9,12–19,23–24; 11:9–10; 12:12–16,31–48; 13:18 – 14:3; 14:3–13; 17:1 – 18:12	Hebrew	Herodian	Fragments of Exodus	
4QExod^{d}	Exodus	4Q15	Exodus 13:15–16 followed directly by 15:1	Hebrew	Hasmonean	Fragments of Exodus about the Passover and a Hymn	
4QExod^{e}	Exodus	4Q16	Exodus 13:3–5,15–16	Hebrew	Hasmonean	Fragments of Exodus about the Passover and a Hymn	
4QExod-Lev^{f}	Exodus–Leviticus	4Q17	Exodus 38:18–22; 39:3–19, 20–24; 40:8–27; Leviticus 1:13–15, 17–2:1	Hebrew	Early Hellenistic	Fragments of Exodus and Leviticus	
4QExod^{g}	Exodus	4Q18	Exodus 14:21–27	Hebrew	Hasmonean	Fragments of Exodus	
4QExod^{h}	Exodus	4Q19	Exodus 6:3–6	Hebrew	Herodian	Fragments of Exodus	
4QExod^{j}	Exodus	4Q20	Exodus 7:28–8:2	Hebrew	Herodian	Fragments of Exodus	
4QExod^{k}	Exodus	4Q21	Exodus 36:9–10	Hebrew	Roman	Fragments of Exodus	
4QpaleoExod^{m} (olim 4QExα)	Paleo-Exodus	4Q22	Exodus 6:25–7:19,29–8:1,[5],12–22; 9:5–16, 19–21, 35–10:12, 19–28; 11:8–12:2,6–8, 13–15, 17–22, 31–32, 34–39; 13:3–8, 12–13; ... 37:9–16	Hebrew	Hasmonean; Paleo-Hebrew script	Fragments of Exodus;	
4QLev-Num^{a}	Leviticus–Numbers	4Q23	Leviticus 13:32–33; 14:22–34, 40–54; 15:10–11, 19–24; 16:15–29;... 27:5–13;...35:4–5	Hebrew	Hasmonean	Fragments of Leviticus	
4QLev^{b}	Leviticus	4Q24	Leviticus 1:11–17; 2:1–15; 3:1, 8–14; 21:17–20, 24; 22:1–33; 23:1–25, 40; 24:2–23; 25:28–29, 45–49, 51–52	Hebrew	Hasmonean	Fragments of Leviticus	
4QLev^{c}	Leviticus	4Q25	Leviticus 1:1–7; 3:16–4:6, 12–14, 23–28; 5:12–13; 8:26–28	Hebrew	Hellenistic-Roman	Fragments of Leviticus	
4QLev^{d}	Leviticus	4Q26	Leviticus 14:27–29, 33–36; 15:20–24; 17:2–11	Hebrew	Hellenistic-Roman	Fragments of Leviticus	
4QLev^{e}	Leviticus	4Q26a	Leviticus 2:4–6, 11–18; 3:2–4,5–8; 19:34–37; 20:1–3, 27–21:4, 9–12, 21–24; 22:4–6, 11–17	Hebrew	Hellenistic-Roman	Fragments of Leviticus	
4QLev^{g}	Leviticus	4Q26b	Leviticus 7:19–26	Hebrew	Hellenistic-Roman	Fragments of Leviticus	
4QNum^{b}	Numbers	4Q27	Numbers 11:31–12:11; 13:7–24; 15:41–16:11, 14–16; 17:12–17; 18:25–19:6; 20:12–13,16–17,19–29; 21:1–2,12–13; 22:5–21, 31–34, 37–38, 41–23:6,13–15,21–22, 27–24:10; 25:4–8,16–18; 26:1–5,7–10,12,14–34,62–27:5,7–8,10,18–19,21–23; 28:13–17,28,30–31; 29:10–13,16–18,26–30; 30:1–3,5–9,15–16; 31:2–6, 21–25, 30–33,35–36,38,43–44,46–32:1,7–10,13–17,19,23–30,35,37–39,41; 33:1–4,23,25,28,31,45,47–48,50–52; 34:4–9,19–21,23; 35:3–5,12,14–15,18–25,27–28, 33–36:2,4–7	Hebrew	Herodian	Fragments of Numbers. A few lines are written in red ink	
4QDeut^{a}	Deuteronomy	4Q28	Deuteronomy 23:26–24:8	Hebrew	175–150 BCE Transitional: Archaic to Hasmonean	Fragments of Deuteronomy	
4QDeut^{b}	Deuteronomy	4Q29	Deuteronomy 29:24–27; 30:3–14; 31:9–17,24–30, 32:1–3	Hebrew	150–100 BCE Early Hasmonean	Fragments of Deuteronomy	
4QDeut^{c}	Deuteronomy	4Q30	Deuteronomy 3:25–26; 4:13–17,31–32; 7:3–4; 8:1–5; 9:11–12, 17–19,29; 10:1–2,5–8; 11:2–4,9–13,18–19; 12:18–19,26,30–31; 13:5–7,11–12,16; 15:1–5,15–19; 16:2–3,5–11,20–17:7,15–18:1; 26:19— 27:2,24–28:14,18–20,22–25,29–30,48–50,61; 29:17–19; 31:16–19; 32:3	Hebrew	150–100 BCE Hasmonean	Fragments of Deuteronomy	
4QDeut^{d}	Deuteronomy	4Q31	Deuteronomy 2:24–33; 3:14–29; 4:1	Hebrew	124–75 BCE Middle Hasmonean	Fragments of Deuteronomy	
4QDeut^{e}	Deuteronomy	4Q32	Deuteronomy 3:24; 7:12–16,21–26; 8:1–16	Hebrew	50–25 BCE Late Hasmonean	Fragments of Deuteronomy	
4QDeut^{f}	Deuteronomy	4Q33	Deuteronomy 4:23–27; 7:22–26; 8:2–14; 9:6–7; 17:17–18; 18:6–10,18–22; 19:17–21; 20:1–6; 21:4–12; 22:12–19; 23:21–26; 24:2–7; 25:3–9; 26:18–27:10	Hebrew	75–50 BCE Late Hasmonean	Fragments of Deuteronomy	
4QDeut^{g}	Deuteronomy	4Q34	Deuteronomy 9:12–14; 23:18–20; 24:16–22; 25:1–5,14–19; 26:1–5; 28:21–25,27–29	Hebrew	1–25 CE Middle Herodian	Fragments of Deuteronomy	
4QDeut^{h}	Deuteronomy	4Q35	Deuteronomy 1:1–17,22–23,29–41,43–2:6,28–30; 19:21; 31:9–11; 33:9–22	Hebrew	50–1 BCE Transitional: Hasmonean to Early Herodian	Fragments of Deuteronomy	
4QDeut^{i}	Deuteronomy	4Q36	Deuteronomy 20:9–13; 21:23; 22:1–9; 23:6–8, 12–16, 22–26; 24:1	Hebrew	100–50 BCE Late Hasmonean	Fragments of Deuteronomy	
4QDeut^{j}	Deuteronomy	4Q37	Exodus 12:43–44, 46–51; 13:1–5; Deuteronomy 5:1–11, 13–15, 21–33; 6:1–3; 8:5–10; 11:6–10, 12–13; 30:17–18; 32:7–8	Hebrew	50 CE Late Herodian	Fragments of Exodus and Deuteronomy	
4QDeut^{k1}	Deuteronomy	4Q38	Deuteronomy 5:28–31; 11:6–13; 32:17–18, 22–23, 25–27	Hebrew	30–1 BCE Early Herodian	Fragments of Deuteronomy	
4QDeut^{k2}	Deuteronomy	4Q38a	Deuteronomy 19: 8–16; 20: 6–19; 21:16; 23:22–26; 24:1–3; 25:19; 26:1–5, 18–19; 27:1	Hebrew	30–1 BCE Early Herodian	Fragments of Deuteronomy	
4QDeut^{k3}	Deuteronomy	4Q38b	Deuteronomy 30: 16–18	Hebrew	50 CE Late Herodian	Fragments of Deuteronomy	
4QDeut^{l}	Deuteronomy	4Q39	Deuteronomy 10:1,14–15; 28:67–68; 29:2–5; 31:12; 33:1–2; 34:4–6,8	Hebrew	50 CE Late Hasmonean	Fragments of Deuteronomy about choosing Life or Death	
4QDeut^{m}	Deuteronomy	4Q40	Deuteronomy 3:18–22; 4:32–33; 7:18–22	Hebrew	50–1 BCE Transitional: Hasmonean to Herodian	Fragments of Deuteronomy	
4QDeut^{n}	All Souls Deuteronomy	4Q41	Deuteronomy 5:1–33; 6:1; 8:5–10	Hebrew	30–1 BCE Early Herodian	Fragments of Deuteronomy	
4QDeut^{o}	Deuteronomy	4Q42	Deuteronomy 2:8; 4:30–34; 5:1–5, 8–9; 28:15–18, 33–36, 47–52, 58–62; 29:22–25	Hebrew	75–50 BCE Late Hasmonean	Fragments of Deuteronomy	
4QDeut^{p}	Deuteronomy	4Q43	Deuteronomy 6:4–11	Hebrew	75–50 BCE Late Hasmonean	Fragments of Deuteronomy about Loving God	
4QDeut^{q}	Deuteronomy	4Q44	Deuteronomy 32:9–10, 37–43	Hebrew	50 BCE–25 CE Late Hasmonean or Early Herodian	Fragments of Deuteronomy	
4QpaleoDeut^{r}	Paleo-Deuteronomy	4Q45	Deuteronomy 7:2–7, 16–25; 11:28,30–12:1,11–12; 13:19; 14:19–22, 26–29; 15:5–6, 8–10; 19:2–3; 21:8–9; 22:3–6,12–15; 28:15–18, 20; 30:7–8; 32:2–8,10–11,13–14, 33–35; 33:2–8, 29; 34:1–2	Hebrew	100–25 BCE Paleo-Hebrew script	Fragments of Deuteronomy	
4QpaleoDeut^{s}	Paleo-Deuteronomy	4Q46	Deuteronomy 26:14–15	Hebrew	250–200 BCE Archaic Paleo-Hebrew script	Fragments of Deuteronomy about giving Tithes	
4QJosh^{a}	Joshua	4Q47	Joshua 8:34–35; 5:?,2–7; 6:5–10; 7:12–17; 8:3–14, 18?; 10:2–5, 8–11.	Hebrew	Hasmonean	Fragments of Joshua	
4QJosh^{b}	Joshua	4Q48	Joshua 2:11–12; 3:15–16; 4:1–3; 17:11–15	Hebrew	Hasmonean	Fragments of Joshua	
4QJudg^{a}	Judges	4Q49	Judges 6:2–6, 11–13	Hebrew	Herodian	Fragments of Judges	
4QJudg^{b}	Judges	4Q50	Judges 19:5–7; 21:12–25	Hebrew	Herodian	Fragments of Judges	
4QSam^{a}	Samuel	4Q51	1 Samuel 1:9, 11–13, 17–18, 22–26, 28; 2:1–10,16–36; 3:1–4,18–21; 4:9–12; 5:8–12; 6:1–7,12–13,16–18,20–21; 7:1; 8:9–20; 9:6–8,11–12,16–24; 10:3–18,25–27; 11:1,7–12; 12:7–8,14–19; 14:24–25,28–34,47–51; 15:24–32; 17:3–6; 24:4–5,8–9,14–23; 25:3–12,20–21,25–26,39–40; 26:10–12,21–23; 27:8–12; 28:1–2,22–25; 30:28–30; 31:2–4; 2 Samuel 2:5–16,25–27,29–32; 3:1–8,23–39; 4:1–4,9–12; 5:1–3,6–16; 6:2–9,12–18; 7:23–29; 8:2–8; 10:4–7,18–19; 11:2–12,16–20; 12:4–5,8–9,13–20,30–31; 13:1–6,13–34,36–39; 14:1–3,18–19; 15:1–6,27–31; 16:1–2,11–13,17–18,21–23; 18:2–7,9–11; 19:7–12; 20:2–3,9–14,23–26; 21:1–2,4–6,15–17; 22:30–51; 23:1–6; 24:16–20	Hebrew	Herodian	Fragments of 1 Samuel and 2 Samuel	
4QSam^{b}	Samuel	4Q52	1 Samuel 16:1–11; 19:10–17; 20:27–42; 21:1–10; 23:9–17	Hebrew	Early Hellenistic	Fragments of 1 Samuel	
4QSam^{c}	Samuel	4Q53	1 Samuel 25:30–32; 2 Samuel 14:7–33; 15:1–15	Hebrew	Hasmonean	Fragments of 1 Samuel and 2 Samuel	
4QKgs	Kings	4Q54	1 Kings 7:31–41; 8:1–9,16–18	Hebrew	Herodian	Fragments of 1 Kings	
4QIsa^{a}	Isaiah	4Q55	Isaiah 1:1–3; 2:7–10; 4:5–6; 6:4–7; 11:12–15; 12:4–6; 13:4–6; 17:9–14; 19:9–14; 20:1–6; 21:1–2,4–16; 22:13–25; 23:1–12	Hebrew	Hasmonean	Fragments of Isaiah	
4QIsa^{b}	Isaiah	4Q56	Isaiah 1:1–6; 2:3–16; 3:14–22; 5:15–28; 9:10–11; 11:7–9; 12:2; 13:3–18; 17:8–14; 18:1,5–7; 19:1–25; 20:1–4; 21:11–14; 22:24–25; 24:2; 26:1–5,7–19; 35:9–10; 36:1–2; 37:2932; 39:1–8; 40:1–4,22–26; 41:8–11; 43:12–15; 44:19–28; 45:20–25; 46:1–3; 49:21–23; 51:14–16; 52:2,7; 53:11–12; 61:1–3; 64:5–11; 65:1; 66:24	Hebrew	Herodian	Fragments of Isaiah	
4QIsa^{c}	Isaiah	4Q57	Isaiah 9:3–12; 10:23–32; 11:4–11,15–16; 12:1; 14:1–5,13; 22:10–14; 23:8–18; 24:1–15,19–23; 25:1–2,8–12; 30:8–17; 33:2–8,16–23; 45:1–4,6–13; 48:10–13,17–19; 50:7–11; 51:1–16; 52:10–15; 53:1–3,6–8; 54:3–17; 55:1–6; 66:20–24	Hebrew	Herodian	Fragments of Isaiah	
4QIsa^{d}	Isaiah	4Q58	Isaiah 46:10–13; 47:1–6,8–9; 48:8–22; 49:1–15; 52:4–7; 53:8–12; 54:1–11; 57:9–21; 58:1–3,5–7	Hebrew	Herodian	Fragments of Isaiah	
4QIsa^{e}	Isaiah	4Q59	Isaiah 2:1–4; 7:17–20; 8:2–14; 9:17–20; 10:1–10; 11:14–15; 12:1–6; 13:1–4; 14:1–13,20–24; 59:15–16	Hebrew	Herodian	Fragments of Isaiah	
4QIsa^{f}	Isaiah	4Q60	Isaiah 1:10–16,18–31; 2:1–3; 5:13–14, 25; 6:3–8,10–13; 7:16–18,23–25; 8:1,4–11; 20:4–6; 22:14–22,25; 24:1–3; 27:1,5–6,8–12; 28:6–9,16–18,22,24; 29:8	Hebrew	Hasmonean	Fragments of Isaiah	
4QIsa^{g}	Isaiah	4Q61	Isaiah 42:14–25; 43:1–4,17–24	Hebrew	Herodian	Fragments of Isaiah	
4QIsa^{h}	Isaiah	4Q61	Isaiah 42:4–11	Hebrew	Herodian	Fragments of Isaiah	
4QIsa^{i}	Isaiah	4Q62	Isaiah 56:7–8; 57:5–8	Hebrew	Hasmonean	Fragments of Isaiah	
4QIsa^{j}	Isaiah	4Q63	Isaiah 1:1–6	Hebrew	Herodian	Fragments of Isaiah	
4QIsa^{k}	Isaiah	4Q64	Isaiah 28:26–29:9	Hebrew	Hasmonean	Fragments of Isaiah	
4QIsa^{l}	Isaiah	4Q65	Isaiah 7:14–15; 8:11–14	Hebrew	Hasmonean	Fragments of Isaiah	
4QIsa^{m}	Isaiah	4Q66	Isaiah 60:20–61:1,3–6	Hebrew	Hasmonean	Fragments of Isaiah	
4QIsa^{n}	Isaiah	4Q67	Isaiah 58:13–14	Hebrew	Hasmonean	Fragments of Isaiah, including elements on punishment (4Q67) and God's blessings for his people (4Q67, 4Q69a).	
4QIsa^{o}	Isaiah	4Q68	Isaiah 14:28–15:2	Hebrew	Hasmonean	Fragments of Isaiah, including elements on punishment (4Q67) and God's blessings for his people (4Q67, 4Q69a).	
4QIsa^{p}	Isaiah	4Q69	Isaiah 5:28–30	Hebrew	Hasmonean	Fragments of Isaiah, including elements on punishment (4Q67) and God's blessings for his people (4Q67, 4Q69a).	
4QIsa^{q}	Isaiah	4Q69a	Isaiah 54:10–13	Hebrew	Hasmonean	Fragments of Isaiah, including elements on punishment (4Q67) and God's blessings for his people (4Q67, 4Q69a).	
4QIsa^{r}	Isaiah	4Q69b	Isaiah 30:23	Hebrew	Hasmonean	Fragments of Isaiah, including elements on punishment (4Q67) and God's blessings for his people (4Q67, 4Q69a).	
4QJer^{a}	Jeremiah	4Q70	Jeremiah 6:30?, 7:1–2, 15–19, 28–9:2, 7–15; 10:9–14, 23; 11:3–6, 19–20; 12:3–7, 13–16, 17; 13:1–7, 22–23? [or 22:3], 27; 14:4–7; 15:1–2; 17:8–26; 18:15–23; 19:1; 20:14–18; 21:1?; 22:3–16; 26:10?	Hebrew	200 BCE – 1 BCE	Fragments of Jeremiah	
4QJer^{b}	Jeremiah	4Q71	Jeremiah 9:22–25; 10:1–21	Hebrew	200 BCE – 1 BCE	Fragments of Jeremiah	
4QJer^{c}	Jeremiah	4Q72	Jeremiah 4:5, 13–16; 8:1–3, 21–23; 9:1–5; 10:12–13; 19:8–9; 20:2–5, 7–9, 13–15; 21:7–10; 22:4–6, 10–28; 25:7–8,15–17, 24–26; 26:10–13; 27:1–3, 13–15; 30:6–9, [10–17], 17–24; 31:1–14, 19–26; 33:?, 16–20	Hebrew	200 BCE – 1 BCE	Fragments of Jeremiah	
4QJer^{d} (olim 4QJer^{b})	Jeremiah	4Q72a	Jeremiah 43:2–10	Hebrew	200 BCE – 1 BCE	Fragments of Jeremiah	
4QJer^{e} (olim 4QJer^{b})	Jeremiah	4Q72b	Jeremiah 50:4–6	Hebrew	200 BCE – 1 BCE	Fragments of Jeremiah	
4QEze^{a}	Ezekiel	4Q73	Ezekiel 10:5–16, 17–22; 11:1–11; 23:14–15, 17–18, 44–47; 41:3–6	Hebrew	Herodian	Fragments of Ezekiel	
4QEze^{b}	Ezekiel	4Q74	Ezekiel 1:10–13, 16–17, 19–24	Hebrew	Herodian	Fragments of Ezekiel	
4QEze^{c}	Ezekiel	4Q75	Ezekiel 24:2–3	Hebrew	Herodian	Fragments of Ezekiel	
4QXII^{a}	The Twelve Minor Prophets	4Q76	Zechariah 14:18; Malachi 2:10–3:24; Jonah 1:1–5, 7–2:1, 7; 3:2	Hebrew	Herodian	Fragments of the Twelve Minor Prophets	
4QXII^{b}	The Twelve Minor Prophets	4Q77	Zephaniah 1:1–2; 2:13–15; 3:19–20; Haggai 1:1–2; 2:2–4	Hebrew	Herodian	Fragments of the Twelve Minor Prophets	
4QXII^{c}	The Twelve Minor Prophets	4Q78	Hosea 2:13–15; 3:2–4; 4:1–19; 5:1; 7:12–13; 13:3–10, 15; 14:1–6; Joel 1:10–20; 2:1, 8–23; 4:6–21; Amos 1:1?; 2:11–16; 3:1–15; 4:1–2; 6:13–14; 7:1–16; Zephaniah 2:15; 3:1–2; Malachi 3:6–7?	Hebrew	Herodian	Fragments of the Twelve Minor Prophets	
4QXII^{d}	The Twelve Minor Prophets	4Q79	Hosea 1:6–2:5	Hebrew	Herodian	Fragments of the Twelve Minor Prophets	
4QXII^{e}	The Twelve Minor Prophets	4Q80	Haggai 2:18–19, 20–21; Zechariah 1:4–6, 8–10, 13–15; 2:10–14; 3:2–10; 4:1–4; 5:8–6:5; 8:2–4, 6–7, 12:7–12	Hebrew	Herodian	Fragments of the Twelve Minor Prophets	
4QXII^{f}	The Twelve Minor Prophets	4Q81	Jonah 1:6–8, 10–16; Micah 5:1–2	Hebrew	Herodian	Fragments of the Twelve Minor Prophets	
4QXII^{g}	The Twelve Minor Prophets	4Q82	Hosea 2:1–5,14–19, 22–25; 3:1–5; 4:1, 10–11, 13–14; 6:3–4, 8–11; 7:1, 12–13, 13–16; 8:1; 9:1–4, 9–17; 10:1–14; 11:2–5, 6–11; 12:1–15; 13:1, 6–8?, 11–13; 14:9–10; Joel 1:12–14; 2:2–13 4:4–9, 11–14, 17, 19–20; Amos 1:3–15; 2:1, 7–9, 15–16; 3:1–2; 4:4–9; 5:1–2, 9–18; 6:1–4, 6–14; 7:1, 7–12, 14–17; 8:1–5, 11–14; 9:1, 5–6, 14–15; Obadiah 1–5, 8–12, 14–15; Jonah 1:1–9; 2:3–11; 3:1–3; 4:5–11; Micah 1:7, 12–15; 2:3–4; 3:12; 4:1–2; 5:6–7 (7–8); 7:2–3, 20; Nahum 1:7–9; 2:9–11; 3:1–3, 17; Habakkuk 2:4?; Zephaniah 3:3–5; Zechariah 10:11–12; 11:1–2; 12:1–3	Hebrew	Herodian	Fragments of the Twelve Minor Prophets	
4QPs^{a}	Psalms	4Q83	Psalm 5:9–13; 6:1–4; 25:15; 31:24–25; 33:1–12; 35:2,14–20,26–28; 36:1–9; 38:2–12,16–23; 47:2; 53:4–7; 54:1–6; 56:4; 62:13; 63:2–4; 66:16–20; 67:1–7; 69:1–19; 71:1–14	Hebrew	Hasmonean	Fragments of Psalms.	
4QPs^{b}	Psalms	4Q84	Psalm 91:5–8,12–15; 92:4–8,13–15; 93:5; 94:1–4,8–14,17–18,21–22; 96:2; 98:4; 99:5–6; 100:1–2; 102:5,10–29; 103:1–6,9–14,20–21; 112:4–5; 113:1; 115:2–3; 116:17–19; 118:1–3,6–11,18–20,23–26,29	Hebrew	Herodian	Fragments of Psalms.	
4QPs^{c} & 4QPs^{t} (Note: In 2022, D. Longacre and B. Strawn demonstrated this small fragment to be part of the larger manuscript 4QPs^{c}, as opposed to a separate manuscript of the Psalms.)	Psalms	4Q85 / 4Q98^{c}	Psalm 16:7–9; 18:3–14,16–18,33–41; 27:12–14; 28:1–2,4; 35:27–28; 37:18–19; 45:8–11; 49:1–17; 50:14–23; 51:1–5; 52:6–11; 53:1 Psalm 88:15–17	Hebrew	Herodian	Fragments of Psalms.	
4QPs^{d}	Psalms	4Q86	Psalm 146:10; 147:1–3,13–17,20; 104:1–5,8–11,14–15,22–25,33–35	Hebrew	Hasmonean	Fragments of Psalms.	
4QPs^{e}	Psalms	4Q87	Psalm 76:10–12; 77:1; 78:6–7,31–33; 81:2–3; 86:10–11; 88:1–4; 89:44–46,50–53; 104:1–3,20–21; 105:22–24,36–45; 109:13; 115:15–18; 116:1–3; 120:6; 125:2–5; 126:1–5; 129:8; 130:1–3	Hebrew	Herodian	Fragments of Psalms.	
4QPs^{f}	Psalms	4Q88	Psalm 22:14–17; 107:2–4,8–11,13–15,18–19,22–30,35; 109:4–6, 25–28; Apostrophe to Zion; Apostrophe to Judah; Eschatological Hymn	Hebrew	Hasmonean	Fragments of Psalms.	
4QPs^{g}	Psalms	4Q89	Psalm 119:37–43,44–46,49–50,73,81–83,90	Hebrew	Herodian	Fragments of Psalms.	
4QPs^{h}	Psalms	4Q90	Psalm 119:10–21	Hebrew	Herodian	Fragments of Psalms.	
4QPs^{j}	Psalms	4Q91	Psalm 48:1–7; 49:6,9–12,15,17	Hebrew	Herodian	Fragments of Psalms.	
4QPs^{k}	Psalms	4Q92	Psalm 26:7–12; 27:1; 30:9–13; 135:7–16;	Hebrew	Hasmonean	Fragments of Psalms.	
4QPs^{l}	Psalms	4Q93	Psalm 104:3–5,11–12	Hebrew	Herodian	Fragments of Psalms.	
4QPs^{m}	Psalms	4Q94	Psalm 93:3–5; 95:3–6; 97:6–9; 98:4–8	Hebrew	Herodian	Fragments of Psalms.	
4QPs^{n}	Psalms	4Q95	Psalm 135:6–9,11–12; 136:23–24	Hebrew	Herodian	Fragments of Psalms.	
4QPs^{o}	Psalms	4Q96	Psalm 114:7; 115:1–2,4; 116:3, 5, 7–10	Hebrew	Herodian	Fragments of Psalms.	
4QPs^{p} (olim 4Q237)	Psalms	4Q97	Psalm 143:2–4, 6–8	Hebrew	Herodian	Fragments of Psalms.	
4QPs^{q}	Psalms	4Q98	Psalm 31:24–25; 33:1–18; 35:4–20	Hebrew	Herodian	Fragments of Psalms, including elements on putting one's hope in God (4Q98d), the earth shaking at the presence of God (4Q98e), the blessings of God's Children and the struggle of the wicked (4Q98f).	
4QPs^{r}	Psalms	4Q98a	Psalm 26:7–12; 27:1; 30:9–13	Hebrew	Herodian	Fragments of Psalms, including elements on putting one's hope in God (4Q98d), the earth shaking at the presence of God (4Q98e), the blessings of God's Children and the struggle of the wicked (4Q98f).	
4QPs^{s}	Psalms	4Q98b	Psalm 5:8–13; 6:1	Hebrew	Herodian	Fragments of Psalms, including elements on putting one's hope in God (4Q98d), the earth shaking at the presence of God (4Q98e), the blessings of God's Children and the struggle of the wicked (4Q98f).	
*4QPs^{t} (see 4QPs^{c})	Psalms	*4Q98c	Psalm 88:15–17	Hebrew	Herodian	Fragments of Psalms, including elements on putting one's hope in God (4Q98d), the earth shaking at the presence of God (4Q98e), the blessings of God's Children and the struggle of the wicked (4Q98f).	
4QPs^{u}	Psalms	4Q98d	Psalm 42:5	Hebrew	Herodian	Fragments of Psalms, including elements on putting one's hope in God (4Q98d), the earth shaking at the presence of God (4Q98e), the blessings of God's Children and the struggle of the wicked (4Q98f).	
4QPs^{v} (olim 4QPs^{u} frg. 2)	Psalms	4Q98e	Psalm 99:1	Hebrew	Herodian	Fragments of Psalms, including elements on putting one's hope in God (4Q98d), the earth shaking at the presence of God (4Q98e), the blessings of God's Children and the struggle of the wicked (4Q98f).	
4QPs^{w}	Psalms	4Q98f	Psalm 112:1–9	Hebrew	Herodian	Fragments of Psalms, including elements on putting one's hope in God (4Q98d), the earth shaking at the presence of God (4Q98e), the blessings of God's Children and the struggle of the wicked (4Q98f).	
4QPs^{x} (olim 4Q236)	Psalms	4Q98g	Psalm 89:20–22, 26, 23, 27–28, 31	Hebrew	Herodian	Fragments of Psalms, including elements on putting one's hope in God (4Q98d), the earth shaking at the presence of God (4Q98e), the blessings of God's Children and the struggle of the wicked (4Q98f).	
4QJob^{a}	Job	4Q99	Job 31:14–19; 32:3–4; 33:10–11, 24–26, 28–30; 35:16; 36:7–11, 13–27, 32–33; 37:1–5, 14–15	Hebrew	Hasmonean	Fragments of Job	
4QJob^{b}	Job	4Q100	Job 8:15–17; 9:27; 13:4; 14:4–6; 31:20–21	Hebrew	Herodian	Fragments of Job	

4Q101–4Q200

Fragment or scroll identifier	Fragment or scroll name	Alternative identifier	English Bible Association	Language	Date/script	Description	Reference
4QpaleoJob^{c}	Paleo-Job	4Q101	Job 13:18–20, 23–27; 14:13–18	Hebrew	Early Hellenistic; Paleo-Hebrew script	Fragment of Job	
4QProv^{a}	Proverbs	4Q102	Proverbs 1:27–33; 2:1	Hebrew	Herodian	Fragments of Proverbs	
4QProv^{b}	Proverbs	4Q103	Proverbs 13:6–9; 14:5–10, 12–13, 31–35; 15:1–8, 19–31; 7:9, 11?	Hebrew	Herodian	Fragments of Proverbs	
4QRuth^{a}	Ruth	4Q104	Ruth 1:1–12	Hebrew	Hasmonean	Fragments of Ruth	
4QRuth^{b}	Ruth	4Q105	Ruth 1:1–6, 12–15	Hebrew	Herodian	Fragments of Ruth	
4QCant^{a}	Canticles (Song of Songs)	4Q106	Song of Songs 3:4–5, 7–11; 4:1–7; 6:11?–12; 7:1–7	Hebrew	Herodian	Fragments of Pesher on Song of Songs/Canticles, including an introduction (4Q106).	
4QCant^{b}	Canticles (Song of Songs)	4Q107	Song of Songs 2:9–17; 3:1–2, 5, 9–11; 4:1–3, 8–11, 14–16; 5:1	Hebrew	Herodian	Fragments of Pesher on Song of Songs/Canticles, including an introduction (4Q106).	
4QCant^{c}	Canticles (Song of Songs)	4Q108	Song of Songs 3:7–8	Hebrew	Hellenistic-Roman	Fragments of Pesher on Song of Songs/Canticles, including an introduction (4Q106).	
4QQoh^{a}	Ecclesiastes	4Q109	Ecclesiastes 5:13–17; 6:1?,3–8,12; 7:1–10,19–20	Hebrew	Hasmonean	Fragments of Ecclesiastes	
4QQoh^{b}	Ecclesiastes	4Q110	Ecclesiastes 1:10–15	Hebrew	Herodian	Fragments of Ecclesiastes	
4QLam	Lamentations	4Q111	Lamentations 1:1–15, 17, 16, 18; 2:5	Hebrew	Herodian	Fragments of Lamentations	
4QDan^{a}	Daniel	4Q112	Daniel 1:16–20; 2:9–11, 19–49; 3:1–2; 4:29–30; 5:5–7, 12–14, 16–19; 7:5–7, 25–28; 8:1–5; 10:16–20; 11:13–16	Hebrew	Hasmonean	Fragments of Daniel	
4QDan^{b}	Daniel	4Q113	Daniel 5:10–12, 14–16, 19–22; 6:8–22, 27–29; 7:1–6, 11?, 26–28; 8:1–8, 13–16	Hebrew	Herodian	Fragments of Daniel	
4QDan^{c}	Daniel	4Q114	Daniel 10:5–9, 11–16, 21; 11:1–2, 13–17, 25–29	Hebrew	Hasmonean	Fragments of Daniel	
4QDan^{d}	Daniel	4Q115	Daniel 3:8–10?, 23–25; 4:5–9, 12–16; 7:15–23	Hebrew	Herodian	Fragments of Daniel	
4QDan^{e}	Daniel	4Q116	Daniel 9:12–17	Hebrew	Hasmonean	Fragments of Daniel	
4QEzra	Ezra	4Q117	Ezra 4:2–6, 9–11; 5:17; 6:1–5	Hebrew	Hasmonean	Fragments of Ezra-Nehemiah	
4QChr/4QChron	Chronicles	4Q118	2 Chronicles 28:27; 29:1–3	Hebrew	Herodian	Fragments of 2 Chronicles	
4QLXXLev^{a} gr	Septuagint Leviticus	4Q119	Leviticus 26:2–16	Greek	Hasmonean	Fragments of Leviticus	
4QpapLXXLev^{b}/ pap4QLXXLev^{b} gr	Septuagint Leviticus	4Q120	Leviticus 1:11; 2:3–5, 7–8?; 3:4, 7, 9–14; 4:3–4, 6–8, 10–11, 18–19, 26–28, 30; 5:6, 8–10, 16–24; [6:1–5]	Greek	Hasmonean	97 fragments of Leviticus. Contains ΙΑΩ for the tetragrammaton	
4QLXXNum^{b} gr	Septuagint Numbers	4Q121	Numbers 3:40–43,50–51?; 4:1?,5–9,11–16; 3:39?	Greek	Herodian	Fragments of Numbers	
4QLXXDeut gr	Septuagint Deuteronomy	4Q122	Deuteronomy 11:4	Greek	Early Hellenistic	Fragments of Deuteronomy	
4QpaleoparaJosh	Paraphrase on Joshua	4Q123	Joshua	Hebrew	Paleo-Hebrew script	"Rewritten Joshua"	
4QUnid gr	Unidentified text	4Q126	—	Greek	Herodian	Fragmentary religious text	
4Qpap paraExod / pap4QParaExod gr	Paraphrase on Exodus	4Q127	Exodus	Greek	Herodian	"Rewritten Exodus"	
4Qphyl^{a}	Phylactery Scrolls	4Q128	Deuteronomy 5:1–14,27–6:3; 10:12–11:21; Exodus 12:43–13:7	Hebrew	Hellenistic-Roman	Fragments of Deuteronomy and Exodus.	
4Qphyl^{b}	Phylactery Scrolls	4Q129	Exodus 13:9–16	Hebrew	Hellenistic-Roman	Fragments of Deuteronomy and Exodus.	
4Qphyl^{c}	Phylactery Scrolls	4Q130	Exodus 13:13–16; Deuteronomy 6:4–9; 11:13–21	Hebrew	Hellenistic-Roman	Fragments of Deuteronomy and Exodus.	
4Qphyl^{d}	Phylactery Scrolls	4Q131	Deuteronomy 11:13–21	Hebrew	Hellenistic-Roman	Fragments of Deuteronomy and Exodus.	
4Qphyl^{e}	Phylactery Scrolls	4Q132	Exodus 13:1–10	Hebrew	Hellenistic-Roman	Fragments of Deuteronomy and Exodus.	
4Qphyl^{f}	Phylactery Scrolls	4Q133	Exodus 13:11–16	Hebrew	Hellenistic-Roman	Fragments of Deuteronomy and Exodus.	
4Qphyl^{g}	Phylactery Scrolls	4Q134	Deuteronomy 5:1–21; Exodus 13:11–12	Hebrew	Hellenistic-Roman	Fragments of Deuteronomy and Exodus.	
4Qphyl^{h}	Phylactery Scrolls	4Q135	Deuteronomy 5:22–6:5; Exodus 13:14–16	Hebrew	Hellenistic-Roman	Fragments of Deuteronomy and Exodus.	
4Qphyl^{i}	Phylactery Scrolls	4Q136	Deuteronomy 6:6–7; 11:13–21; Exodus 12:43–13:10	Hebrew	Hellenistic-Roman	Fragments of Deuteronomy and Exodus.	
4Qphyl^{j} (olim 4Qphyl^{a})	Phylactery Scrolls	4Q137	Deuteronomy 5:24–32; 6:2–3	Hebrew		Fragments of Deuteronomy and Exodus.	
4Qphyl^{k}	Phylactery Scrolls	4Q138	Deuteronomy 10:12–11:17	Hebrew	Hellenistic-Roman	Fragments of Deuteronomy and Exodus.	
4Qphyl^{l}	Phylactery Scrolls	4Q139	Deuteronomy 5:7–24	Hebrew	Hellenistic-Roman	Fragments of Deuteronomy and Exodus.	
4Qphyl^{m}	Phylactery Scrolls	4Q140	Exodus 12:44–13:10; Deuteronomy 5:33–6:5	Hebrew	Hellenistic-Roman	Fragments of Deuteronomy and Exodus.	
4Qphyl^{n}	Phylactery Scrolls	4Q141	Deuteronomy 32:14–20, 32–33	Hebrew	Hellenistic-Roman	Fragments of Deuteronomy and Exodus.	
4Qphyl^{o}	Phylactery Scrolls	4Q142	Deuteronomy 5:1–16, 6:7–9	Hebrew	Hellenistic-Roman	Fragments of Deuteronomy and Exodus.	
4Qphyl^{p}	Phylactery Scrolls	4Q143	Deuteronomy 10:22–11:3,18–21	Hebrew	Hellenistic-Roman	Fragments of Deuteronomy and Exodus.	
4Qphyl^{q}	Phylactery Scrolls	4Q144	Exodus 13:4–9; Deuteronomy 11:4–18	Hebrew	Hellenistic-Roman	Fragments of Deuteronomy and Exodus.	
4Qphyl^{r}	Phylactery Scrolls	4Q145	Exodus 13:1–10	Hebrew	Hellenistic-Roman	Fragments of Deuteronomy and Exodus.	
4QPhyl^{s}	Phylactery Scrolls	4Q146	Deuteronomy 11:19–21	Hebrew	Hellenistic-Roman	Fragments of Deuteronomy and Exodus.	
4Qphyl^{t}	Phylactery Scrolls	4Q147		Hebrew	Hellenistic-Roman	Could not be deciphered	
4Qphyl^{u}	Phylactery Scrolls	4Q148		Hebrew	Hellenistic-Roman	Could not be deciphered	
4QMez^{a}	Mezuzah Scrolls	4Q149		Hebrew	Hasmonean	Fragments of Exodus and Deuteronomy	
4QMez^{b}	Mezuzah Scrolls	4Q150	Deuteronomy 6:5–6; 10:14–11:2	Hebrew	Herodian	Fragments of Exodus and Deuteronomy	
4QMez^{c}	Mezuzah Scrolls	4Q151	Deuteronomy 5:27–6:9; 10:12–20	Hebrew	Herodian	Fragments of Exodus and Deuteronomy	
4QMez^{d}	Mezuzah Scrolls	4Q152	Deuteronomy 6:5–7	Hebrew	Herodian	Fragments of Exodus and Deuteronomy	
4QMez^{e}	Mezuzah Scrolls	4Q153	Deuteronomy 11:17–18	Hebrew	Hellenistic-Roman	Fragments of Exodus and Deuteronomy	
4QMez^{f}	Mezuzah Scrolls	4Q154	Deuteronomy 13:1–4	Hebrew	Hasmonean	Fragments of Exodus and Deuteronomy	
4QMez^{g}	Mezuzah Scrolls	4Q155		Hebrew	Hellenistic-Roman	Fragments of Exodus and Deuteronomy	
4QtgLev	Targum of Leviticus	4Q156	Leviticus 16:12–15,18–21	Aramaic	Hasmonean	Fragments of Leviticus	
4QtgJob	Targum of Job	4Q157	Job 3:5–6; 4:17–5:4	Aramaic	Herodian	Fragments of Job	
4QRP^{a}	Reworked Pentateuch A	4Q158	Genesis 32:25–30; 32:31 ?; Exodus 3:12; 4:27–28; 19:17–23; 24:4–6; 20:12–17,19–21 (Samaritan), 22–26; 21:15–25, 32–37; 22:1–13; 30:32.34; Deuteronomy 5:30–31; 21:1–10	Hebrew	Herodian	Reworked Pentateuch	
4QOrdinances^{a}	Ordinances A	4Q159		Hebrew	Herodian	Non-biblical composition	
4QVisSam	Vision of Samuel	4Q160		Hebrew	Hasmonean	Non-biblical composition	
4QpIsaiah^{a}	Pesher on Isaiah	4Q161		Hebrew	Herodian	Non-biblical composition	
4QpIsaiah^{b}	Pesher on Isaiah	4Q162		Hebrew	Herodian	Non-biblical composition	
4QpHosA	Pesher on Hosea A	4Q166		Hebrew	Herodian	Hosea Commentary Scroll	
4QpHosB	Pesher on Hosea B	4Q167		Hebrew	Herodian	Hosea Commentary Scroll	
4QpMic(?)	Pesher on Micah?	4Q168		Hebrew	Herodian	Micah Commentary?	
4QpNah	Pesher on Nahum	4Q169	Nahum 1:3–6; 2:12–14; 3:1–5, 6–9, 10–12, 14	Hebrew	Herodian	Containing the term "The Seekers after Smooth Things"	
4Q Eschatological Commentary A	Florilegium or Midrash on the Last Days	4Q174	2 Samuel 7:10–14 (1 Chronicles 17:9–13); Exodus 15:17–18; Amos 9:11; Psalm 1:1; Isaiah 8:11; Ezekiel 37:23?; Psalm 2:1; Daniel 12:10; 11:32; Deuteronomy 33:8–11, 12, 19–21	Hebrew	Herodian	Quotations from biblical passages with midrashic commentary	
4QTest	Testimonia	4Q175	Deuteronomy 5:28–29; 18:18–19; 33:8–11 Numbers 24:15–17 Joshua 6:26, quoted in Psalms of Joshua (4Q379, frag. 22)	Hebrew	Herodian; Hasmonean script	A list of quotations; Messianic Anthology or Testimonia	
4QapocrLamA	Apocryphal Lamentations A	4Q179	Lamentations	Hebrew	Herodian	cf. 4Q501	
4Q Horoscope	Physiognomies/Horoscopes	4Q186		Hebrew	Herodian		
4QpapTobit^{a}	Tobit	4Q196	Tobit	Aramaic	Hasmonean	On Papyrus. cf. 4Q501	
4QTobit^{b}	Tobit	4Q197	Tobit	Aramaic	Herodian	cf. 4Q501	
4QTobit^{c}	Tobit	4Q198	Tobit	Aramaic	Hasmonean	cf. 4Q501	
4QTobit^{d}	Tobit	4Q199	Tobit	Aramaic	Hasmonean	cf. 4Q501	
4QTobit^{e}	Tobit	4Q200	Tobit	Hebrew	Herodian	cf. 4Q501	

4Q201–4Q300

Fragment or scroll identifier	Fragment or scroll name	Alternative identifier	English Bible Association	Language	Date/script	Description	Reference
4QEn^{a}	The Enoch Scroll	4Q201^{a}		Aramaic	Hasmonean		
4QALD / 4QLevi^{a-f} ar	The Aramaic Levi Document (ALD)	4Q213 4Q213a 4Q213b 4Q214 4Q214a 4Q214b		Aramaic	Hasmonean	Multiple compositions	
4QTNaph	Testament of Naphtali	4Q215		Hebrew	Herodian		
4QCant^{a}(?)	Pesher on Canticles/Song of Songs	4Q240	Song of Songs	Hebrew	Herodian	Included in Milik's original list, but this fragment has never been located	
4QapocrDan	Aramaic Apocalypse or The Son of God Text	4Q246		Aramaic	Herodian		
4QCommentary on Gen A /4QCommGenA	Commentary/Pesher on Genesis	4Q252	Genesis 6:3; 7:10–8:18; 9:24–27; 11:31; 15:9, 17, 17:20?; 18:31–32 (with Deuteronomy 13:16, 17; 20:11, 14); 22:10–12; 28:3–4; 36:12; 49:3–4, 10 (with Jeremiah 33:17), 20–21	Hebrew	Herodian	Fragments/ commentary of Genesis.	
4QCommentary on Gen B /4QCommGenB	Commentary/Pesher on Genesis	4Q253	Genesis	Hebrew	Herodian	Fragments/ commentary of Genesis.	
4QCommentary on Gen C /4QCommGenC	Commentary/Pesher on Genesis	4Q254	Genesis 9:24–25; 22:5?, 17?	Hebrew	Herodian	Fragments/ commentary of Genesis.	
4QCommentary on Gen D (olim 4QpGen^{c})	Commentary/Pesher on Genesis	4Q254^{a}–820	Genesis 6:15	Hebrew	Herodian	Fragments/ commentary of Genesis.	
4QS^{d}	Serekh ha-Yahad or Community Rule	4Q258		Hebrew	Herodian	cf. 1QS^{d}	
4QD	The Damascus Document	4Q265–273		Hebrew	Hasmonean	cf. 4QD^{a/g} = 4Q266/272, 4QD^{a/e} = 4Q266/270, 5Q12, 6Q15, 4Q265–73	
4Q Sefer ha-Milhamah	Rule of War	4Q285		Hebrew	Herodian	cf. 11Q14	
4QMyst^{a}	The Book of Mysteries; The Book of Secrets	4Q299		Hebrew	Herodian		
4QMyst^{b}	The Book of Mysteries; The Book of Secrets	4Q300		Hebrew	Herodian		

4Q301-

Fragment or scroll identifier	Fragment or scroll name	Alternative identifier	English Bible Association	Language	Date/script	Description	Reference
4QMyst^{c}	The Book of Mysteries; The Book of Secrets	4Q301		Hebrew	Herodian		
4QRP^{b}	Reworked Pentateuch	4Q364	Genesis 25:18–21; 26:7–8; 27:39; 28:6; 29:32–33; 30:8–14,26–36; 31:47–53; 32:18–20,26–30; 34:2; 35:28; 37:7–8; 38:14–21; 44:30–34; 45:1,21–27; 48:14–15; Exodus 21:14–22; 19:17; 24:12–14,18; 25:1–2; 26:1,33–35; Numbers 14:16–20; 33:31–49; 20:17–18; Deuteronomy 2:8–14, 30–37; 3:2,18–23; 9:6–7,12–18, 21–25,27–29; 10:1–4, 6–7, 10–13,22; 11:1–2,6–9,23–24; 14:24–26	Hebrew	Late Hasmonean or Herodian	Reworked Pentateuch	
4QRP^{c}	Reworked Pentateuch	4Q365	Exodus 8:13–19; 9:9–12; 10:19–20; 14:10,12–21; 15:6-[21],22–26; 17:3–5; 18:13–16; 26:34–36; 28:16–20; 29:20–22; 30:27–38; 31:1–2; 35:[2]–5; 36:32–38; 37:29; 38:1–7; 39:1–19; Leviticus 11:1[3],17-[25],32-[33],[39]-[46]; 13:6–8,15-[19],51–52; 16:6–7; 18:[25]-[29]; 23:42–44; 24:1–2; 25:7–9; 26:17–32; 27:34; Numbers 1:1–5; 3:26–30; 4:47–49; 7:1,78–80; 8:11–12; 9:15–23; 10:1-[4]; 13:[11]–25,[28]–30; 15:26-[29]; 17:20–24; 27:11; 36:1–2; Deuteronomy 2:24; 19:20–21; 20:1	Hebrew	Late Hasmonean/ Early Herodian	Reworked Pentateuch	
4QRP^{d}	Reworked Pentateuch	4Q366	Exodus 21;35–37; 22:1–5; Leviticus 24:20–22; 25:39–43; Numbers 29:14-[25], 32–39; 30:1; Deuteronomy 16:13–14; 14:[13]–21	Hebrew	Herodian	Reworked Pentateuch	
4QRP^{e}	Reworked Pentateuch	4Q367	Leviticus 11:47; 12:1–8; 13:1; 15:14–15; 19:1–4,9–15; 20:13; 27:30–34	Hebrew	Hasmonean	Reworked Pentateuch	
4QapocrJosh^{a}	Apocryphon of Joshua	4Q378		Hebrew	Herodian	Texts drawing on the content of Joshua, Exodus and Numbers.	
4QapocrJosh^{b}	Apocryphon of Joshua	4Q379		Hebrew	Hasmonean	Texts drawing on the content of Joshua, Exodus and Numbers.	
4QpsEzek	Pseudo-Ezekiel	4Q385; 4Q385b; 4Q385c; 4Q386; 4Q388; 4Q391		Hebrew	Herodian		
4QMMT /4Q Cal.Doc.D	Miqsat Ma'ase Ha-Torah or Some Precepts of the Law or the Halakhic Letter	4Q394–399		Hebrew	Herodian		
4Q Non-Canonical Psalms A	Songs of Sabbath Sacrifice or the Angelic Liturgy	4Q400–407		Hebrew	Hasmonean	cf. 11Q5–6	
4QInstruction	Sapiential Work A	4Q415–418		Hebrew	Herodian		
4QParaphrase	Paraphrase of Genesis and Exodus	4Q415–418		Hebrew	Herodian		
4Q Barkhi Nafshi^{a}	Barkhi Nafshi – Apocryphal Psalms	4Q434		Hebrew	Herodian	15 fragments: likely hymns of thanksgiving praising God for his power and expressing thanks	
4Q Apocr. Psalm and Prayer	Hymn to King Jonathan or The Prayer For King Jonathan Scroll	4Q448	Psalms 154	Hebrew	Hasmonean	In addition to parts of Psalms 154 it contains a prayer mentioning "King Jonathan".	
4QpapGen or papJub	pap-Genesis or pap-Jubilees	4Q483	Genesis 1:28–29, or Book of Jubilees	Hebrew	Herodian		
4QShir^{a-b}	Songs of the Sage or Songs of the Maskil	4Q510–511		Hebrew	Herodian		
4Q Messianic Apocalypse	Messianic Apocalypse	4Q521		Hebrew	Hasmonean	Made up of two fragments	
4Q Jonathan		4Q523		Hebrew	Hasmonean	MeKleine Fragmente, z.T. gesetzlichen Inhalts; Fragment is legal in content. PAM number, 41.944	
4QTempleScroll^{b}	Temple Scroll	4Q524		Hebrew	Hasmonean		
4QBeatitudes		4Q525	Sirach 25:10; Matthew 5:3 –12 (Beatitudes)	Hebrew	Herodian		
4Q TJoseph	Testament of Joseph	4Q539		Aramaic	Hasmonean		
4QapocrLevi(?)^{b}	Testament of Levi^{d}	4Q541		Aramaic	Hasmonean	Aramaic frag. also called "4QApocryphon of Levi^{b} ar"	
4QTKohath (4QTQahat)	Testament of Qahat	4Q542		Aramaic	Hasmonean		
4QNJ^{c}	New Jerusalem	4Q555		Aramaic	Herodian	cf. 1Q32, 2Q24, 5Q15, 11Q18	
4QGen^{n}	Genesis	4Q576	Genesis 34:7–10; 50:3	Hebrew	Hasmonean		
Unnumbered				Hebrew		Nine unopened fragments recently rediscovered in storage	

=== Qumran Cave 5 ===
Description

Wadi Qumran Cave 5 was discovered alongside Cave 6 in 1952, shortly after the discovery of Cave 4. Cave 5 produced approximately 25 manuscripts.

Fragment or scroll identifier	Fragment or scroll name	Alternative identifier	English Bible Association	Language	Date/script	Description	Reference
Qumran Cave 5
5QDeut	Deuteronomy	5Q1	Deuteronomy 7:15–24; 8:5–9:2	Hebrew	Early Hellenistic		
5QKgs	Kings	5Q2	1 Kings 1:1,16–17,27–37	Hebrew	Hasmonean		
5QIsa	Isaiah	5Q3	Isaiah 40:16,18–19	Hebrew	Herodian		
5QAmos	Amos	5Q4	Amos 1:2–5	Hebrew			
5QPs	Psalms	5Q5	Psalm 119:99–101,104,113–20,138–42	Hebrew	Herodian		
5QLam^{a}	Lamentations	5Q6	Lamentations 4:5–8,11–16,19–22; 5:1–13,16–17	Hebrew	Herodian		
5QLam^{b}	Lamentations	5Q7	Lamentations 4:17–20	Hebrew	Herodian		
5QPhyl	Phylactery	5Q8		Hebrew	Hellenistic-Roman	Phylactery in its unopened case	
5QapocrJosh or 5QToponyms	Toponyms	5Q9		Hebrew	Herodian	Seven fragments with names of places	
5QapocrMal	Apocryphon of Malachi	5Q10		Hebrew	Hellenistic-Roman	Apocryphon of Malachi	
5QS	Rule of Community (Serek ha-Yahad)	5Q11		Hebrew	Herodian		
5QD	Damascus Document	5Q12		Hebrew	Herodian	Damascus Document	
5QRule or 5QRégle	Rule of Community	5Q13		Hebrew	Hellenistic-Roman	Fragments related to 1QS	
5QCurses	Curses	5Q14		Hebrew	Herodian	Liturgical compositions with curses	
5QNJ	New Jerusalem Scroll	5Q15		Aramaic	Hellenistic-Roman	Description of the New Jerusalem	
5QUnid	Unidentified	5Q16–5Q24		Hebrew	Hellenistic-Roman	Unidentified fragments	
5QUnc	Unclassified	5Q25		Hebrew	Hellenistic-Roman	Unclassified fragments	

=== Qumran Cave 6 ===
Description

Wadi Qumran Cave 6 was discovered alongside Cave 5 in 1952, shortly after the discovery of Cave 4. Cave 6 contained fragments of about 31 manuscripts.

Fragment or scroll identifier	Fragment or scroll name	Alternative identifier	English Bible Association	Language	Date/script	Description	Reference
Qumran Cave 6
6QpaleoGen	Genesis	6Q1	Genesis 6:13–21	Hebrew	Early Hellenistic; Palaeo-Hebrew script		
6QpaleoLev	Leviticus	6Q2	Leviticus 8:12–13	Hebrew	Early Hellenistic; Palaeo-Hebrew script		
pap6QDeut or 6QpapDeut(?)	Deuteronomy	6Q3	Deuteronomy 26:19	Hebrew	Hellenistic-Roman	A few letters of Deuteronomy 26:19 on papyrus	
6QpapKgs	Kings	6Q4	1 Kings 3:12–14; 12:28–31; 22:28–31; 2 Kings 5:26; 6:32; 7:8–10,20; 8:1–5; 9:1–2; 10:19–21	Hebrew	Hasmonean	Made up of 94 Fragments.	
pap6QPs or 6QpapPs(?)	Psalms	6Q5	Psalm 78:36–37	Hebrew	Herodian		
6QCant	Song of Songs	6Q6	Song of Songs 1:1–7	Hebrew	Herodian		
6QpapDan	Daniel	6Q7	Daniel 8:20–21; 10:8–16; 11:33–36,38; 8:16–17	Hebrew	Herodian	13 papyrus fragments.	
6QpapGiants or pap6QEnGiants	Book of Giants from Enoch	6Q8		Aramaic	Herodian	Part of the "Book of Giants"	
6Qpap apocrSam-Kgs or pap6QapocrSam/Kgs	Apocryphon on Samuel–Kings	6Q9		Hebrew	Hasmonean	Samuel–Kings apocryphon. Written on papyrus.	
6QpapaProph or pap6QProph	Unidentified prophetic fragment	6Q10		Hebrew	Hasmonean	Prophetic text. Written in papyrus	
6QAllegory	Allegory of the Vine	6Q11		Hebrew	Herodian	Fragment containing an Allegory mentioning a vine	
6QapProph	An apocryphal prophecy	6Q12		Hebrew	Herodian		
6QPriestProph	Priestly Prophecy	6Q13		Hebrew	Herodian	A priestly prophecy	
6Q Apocalypse	Apocalyptic text	6Q14		Aramaic	Herodian	Two fragments with apocalyptic text	
6QD	Damascus Document	6Q15		Hebrew	Herodian	Damascus Document 4:19–21; 5:13–14,18–21; 6:1–2,20–21; 7:1	
6QpapBened or pap6QBen	papBenediction	6Q16		Hebrew	Herodian	Blessings related 1QSb. On papyrus	
6QCalDoc	Calendrical Document	6Q17		Hebrew	Herodian	Calendric fragment	
pap6QHymn	Hymn	6Q18		Hebrew	Herodian	Fragment of a hymn, related to 1QM	
6Q Text Related to Genesis	Genesis	6Q19	Possibly from Genesis	Aramaic	Herodian	Related to Genesis 10:6,20	
6QDeut(?)	Deuteronomy	6Q20	Possibly from Deuteronomy	Hebrew	Hellenistic-Roman	Related to Deuteronomy 11:10	
6QfrgProph or 6Q Prophetic Text	Possibly prophetic text	6Q21		Hebrew	Herodian	Prophetic fragment containing 5 words.	
pap6QUnidA	Unclassified fragments	6Q22		Hebrew	Herodian		
pap6QUnidA ar	Unclassified fragments	6Q23		Aramaic	Herodian	Related to "Words of the Book of Michael"	
6QUnidB	Unclassified fragments	6Q24		Hebrew	Hellenistic-Roman		
6QUnidB	Unclassified fragments	6Q25		Aramaic	Herodian		
6QUnidB or 6QpapAccount or Contract	Accounts or contracts	6Q26		Aramaic	Hellenistic-Roman		
6QUnidB	Unclassified fragments	6Q27–6Q28		Hebrew	Hellenistic-Roman		
6QpapProv	Proverbs	6Q30	Proverbs 11:4b–7a,10b	Hebrew	Roman	Single six-line fragment	
6QUnidB	Unclassified fragments	6Q31		Aramaic	Herodian		

=== Qumran Cave 7 ===
Description

Wadi Qumran Cave 7 yielded fewer than 20 fragments of Greek documents, including 7Q2 (the "Letter of Jeremiah" = Baruch 6), 7Q5 (which became the subject of much speculation in later decades), and a Greek copy of a scroll of Enoch. Cave 7 also produced several inscribed potsherds and jars.

Fragment or scroll identifier	Fragment or scroll name	Alternative identifier	English Bible Association	Language	Date/script	Description	Reference
Qumran Cave 7
7QpapLXXExod	Exodus	7Q1	Exodus 28:4–7	Greek	Hasmonean	Greek fragment of Exodus	
7QpapEpJer	Letter of Jeremiah	7Q2	Letter of Jeremiah verses 43–44	Greek	Hasmonean	Epistle of Jeremiah. On papyrus.	
7Q3	Unidentified	7Q3		Greek	Herodian	Unknown biblical text	
7Q4	Unidentified	7Q4		Greek	Hasmonean	Unknown biblical text	
7Q5	Unidentified	7Q5		Greek	Herodian	Unknown biblical text. Believed by some to be Mark 6:52–53	
7Q6–18	Unidentified	7Q6–18		Greek	Hellenistic-Roman; Herodian	Very tiny unidentified fragments written on papyrus	
7Q papImprint	Unidentified	7Q19		Greek	Herodian	Unidentified papyrus imprint. Very tiny fragments written on papyrus	

=== Qumran Cave 8 ===
Description

Wadi Qumran Cave 8, along with caves 7 and 9, was one of the only caves that are accessible by passing through the settlement at Qumran. Carved into the southern end of the Qumran plateau, cave 8 was excavated by archaeologists in 1957. Cave 8 produced five fragments: Genesis (8QGen), Psalms (8QPs), a tefillin fragment (8QPhyl), a mezuzah (8QMez), and a hymn (8QHymn). Cave 8 also produced several tefillin cases, a box of leather objects, tons of lamps, jars, and the sole of a leather shoe.

Fragment or scroll identifier	Fragment or scroll name	Alternative identifier	English Bible Association	Language	Date/script	Description	Reference
Qumran Cave 8
8QGen	Genesis	8Q1	Genesis 17:12–13, 15, 18–19; 18:20–22, 24–25	Hebrew	Herodian		
8QPs	Psalms	8Q2	Psalm 17:5–9, 14; 18:5–12	Hebrew	Herodian		
8QPhyl	Phylacteries	8Q3	Exodus 13:1–16; 12:43–51; 20:11 Deuteronomy 6:4–5; 6:1–3; 10:20–22; 10:12–19; 5:1–14; 10:13; 11:2–3; 10:21–22; 11:1; 11:6–12	Hebrew	1–100 CE Herodian	Fragments from a "Phylactery"	
8QMez	Mezuzah	8Q4	Deuteronomy 10:1–11:21	Hebrew	30 BCE–68 CE Herodian		
8QHymn	Unidentified hymn	8Q5		Hebrew	Herodian	Non-biblical composition.	

=== Qumran Cave 9 ===
Description

Wadi Qumran Cave 9, along with caves 7 and 8, was one of the only caves that are accessible by passing through the settlement at Qumran. Carved into the southern end of the Qumran plateau, Cave 9 was excavated by archaeologists in 1957. There was only one manuscript fragment found in Cave 9.

Fragment or scroll identifier	Fragment or scroll name	Alternative identifier	English Bible Association	Language	Date/script	Description	Reference
Qumran Cave 9
9Qpap	Unidentified	9Q1		Hebrew	Roman	Written on papyrus.	

=== Qumran Cave 10 ===
Description

In Qumran Cave 10 archaeologists found two ostraca with writing on them, along with an unknown symbol on a grey stone slab.

Fragment or scroll identifier	Fragment or scroll name	Alternative identifier	English Bible Association	Language	Date/script	Description	Reference
Qumran Cave 10
10QOstracon	Ostracon	10Q1		Hebrew		Two letters written on a piece of pottery.	

=== Qumran Cave 11 ===
Description

Wadi Qumran Cave 11 was discovered in 1956 and yielded 21 texts of the Dead Sea Scrolls, some of which were quite lengthy. The Temple Scroll, so called because more than half of it pertains to the construction of the Temple of Jerusalem, was found in Cave 11, and is by far the longest scroll. It is now 26.7 feet (8.15 m) long. Its original length may have been over 28 feet (8.75 m). The Temple Scroll was regarded by scholar Yigael Yadin as "The Torah According to the Essenes". On the other hand, Hartmut Stegemann, a contemporary and friend of Yadin, believed the scroll was not to be regarded as such, but was a document without exceptional significance. Stegemann notes that it is not mentioned or cited in any known Essene writing.

Also in Cave 11, an eschatological fragment about the biblical figure Melchizedek (11Q13) was found. Cave 11 also produced a copy of Jubilees.

According to former chief editor of the DSS editorial team John Strugnell, there are at least four privately owned scrolls from Cave 11, that have not yet been made available for scholars. Among them is a complete Aramaic manuscript of the Book of Enoch·.

Fragment or scroll identifier	Fragment or scroll name	Alternative identifier	English Bible Association	Language	Date/script	Description	Reference
Qumran Cave 11
11QpaleoLev^{a}	Paleo-Leviticus^{a}	11Q1	Leviticus 4:24–26; 10:4–7; 11:27–32; 13:3–9; 13:39–43; 14:16–21; 14:52–15:5; 16:2–4; 16:34–17:5; 18:27–19:4; 20:1–6; 21:6–11; 22:21–27; 23:22–29; 24:9–14; 25:28–36; 26:17–26; 27:11–19	Hebrew	Herodian/palaeo-Hebrew script		
11QLev^{b}	Leviticus^{b}	11Q2	Leviticus	Hebrew	Herodian/palaeo-Hebrew script		
11QDeut	Deuteronomy	11Q3	Deuteronomy 1:4–5; 2:28–30	Hebrew	50 CE Late Herodian		
11QEzek	Ezekiel	11Q4	Ezekiel	Hebrew	Herodian		
11QPs	The Great Psalms Scroll	11Q5	Psalms	Hebrew	Herodian	A unique Psalms scroll with only about a quarter of the Masoretic psalms (in atypical order), three Syriac psalms, one from Ben Sira, and the only known copies of three more unique psalms—Plea for Deliverance, Apostrophe to Zion, and Hymn to the Creator—all of which are unattested by other sources, as well as the short text of David's Compositions.	
11QPs^{a}	Psalms	11Q5		Hebrew	Herodian		
11QPs^{b}	Psalms	11Q6	Psalm 77:18–21; 78:1; 109:3–4; 118:1; 118:15–16; 119:163–165; 133:1–3; 141:10; 144:1–2	Hebrew	Herodian		
11QPs^{c}	Psalms	11Q7	Psalm 2:1–8; 9:3–7; 12:5–9; 13:1–6; 14:1–6; 17:9–15; 18:1–12; 19:4–8; 25:2–7	Hebrew	Herodian		
11QPs^{d}	Psalms	11Q8	Psalm 6:2–4; 9:3–6; 18:26–29; 18:39–42; 36:13; 37:1–4; 39:13–14; 40:1; 43:1–3; 45:6–8; 59:5–8; 68:1–5; 68:14–18; 78:5–12; 81:4–9; 86:11–14; 115:16–18; 116:1	Hebrew	Herodian		
11QPs^{e}	Psalms	11Q9	Psalm 50:3–7	Hebrew	Herodian		
11QtgJob	Targum Job	11Q10	Job	Aramaic	Herodian	A unique Aramaic translation of the Book of Job; presents Job somewhat more favourably.	
11QapocrPs	Apocryphal Psalms	11Q11	Psalm 91	Hebrew	Herodian	Apocryphal paraphrase of Psalms 91	
11QJub	Jubilees	11Q12		Hebrew	Herodian	Ethiopic text of Jubilees 4:6–11; 4:13–14; 4:16–17; 4:29–31; 5:1–2; 12:15–17; 12:28–29	
11QMelch	Melchizedek	11Q13	Contains Pesher/commentary on Leviticus 25:13; Deuteronomy 15:2; Psalm 7:8–9; 82:2; Isaiah 52:7; Daniel 9:25; Leviticus 25:9	Hebrew	50–25 BCE or 75–50 BCE Late Hasmonean or Early Herodian	Describes a tenth jubilee and portrays Melchizedek as a messianic agent of salvation, using similar language to that used for Jesus in Hebrews, such as "Heavenly Prince Melchizedek"	
11Q Sefer ha-Milhamah	Sefer ha-Milhamah ("The Book of War")	11Q14		Hebrew	Herodian	An account of the final eschatological battle of the Israelites and the Kittim (Romans), including a messianic figure named the "Prince of the Congregation."	
11QHymns^{a}	Hymns	11Q15		Hebrew	Herodian		
11QHymns^{b}	Hymns	11Q16		Hebrew	Herodian		
11QShirShabb	Songs of the Sabbath Sacrifice	11Q17		Hebrew	Herodian	Collection of 13 hymns describing a heavenly temple service.	
11QNJ	New Jerusalem	11Q18		Aramaic	Herodian	Appears to be an apocalyptic vision, including some architectural details of a very large city (cf. Ezekiel and Revelation)	
11QT^{a}	Temple Scroll	11Q19		Hebrew	Herodian	Rephrases the Pentateuch laws in the spirit of Deuteronomy, seeks to resolve biblical legal conflicts and expand ritual laws.	
11QT^{b}	Temple Scroll	11Q20		Hebrew	Herodian	Rephrases the Pentateuch laws in the spirit of Deuteronomy, seeks to resolve biblical legal conflicts and expand ritual laws.	
11QT^{c}	Temple Scroll	11Q21		Hebrew	Herodian	Rephrases the Pentateuch laws in the spirit of Deuteronomy, seeks to resolve biblical legal conflicts and expand ritual laws.	
11Q Unidentified	Unidentified	11Q22		Hebrew	Hasmonean	Unidentified fragments.	
11Q Unidentified	Unidentified	11Q23		Hebrew	Hellenistic-Roman	Unidentified fragments.	
11Q Unidentified	Unidentified	11Q24		Aramaic	Hasmonean	Unidentified fragments.	
11Q Unidentified	Unidentified	11Q25		Hebrew	Herodian	Unidentified fragments.	
11Q Unidentified	Unidentified	11Q26		Hebrew	Herodian	Unidentified fragments.	
11Q Unidentified	Unidentified	11Q27		Hebrew	Hellenistic-Roman	Unidentified fragments.	
11Q Unidentified	Unidentified	11Q28		Hebrew	Hellenistic-Roman	Unidentified fragments.	
		11Q29				Serekh ha-Yahad related	
11Q Unidentified	Unidentified	11Q30		Hebrew	Herodian	Unidentified fragments.	
11Q Unidentified	Unidentified	11Q31				Unidentified fragment	
11Q9999	Unidentified				Hellenistic-Roman		

=== Wadi Murabba'at Cave 1 ===
Fragment or scroll identifier	Fragment or scroll name	Alternative identifier	English Bible Association	Language	Date/script	Description	Reference
Wadi Murabba'at Cave 1
Mur1	Pentateuch	Mur1	Genesis 32:4–5, 30, 33–33:1; 34:5–7, 30–35:1, 4–7 Exodus 6:5-11	Hebrew	Roman	Parts of Genesis, Exodus, and Numbers.	
MurDeut	Deuteronomy	Mur2	Deuteronomy 10:1–3	Hebrew	20–84 AD Roman		
MurIsa	Isaiah	Mur3		Hebrew	Roman		
MurPhyl	Phylacteries	Mur4	Contains Exodus 13:1–16; Deuteronomy 11:13–21; 6:4–9	Hebrew	Roman		
MurMez	Mezouza	Mur5	Contains Exodus 13:1–16; Deuteronomy 11:13–21; 6:4–9	Hebrew	Roman		
Mur6	Unidentified literary text	Mur6					

=== Nahal Hever Cave 8 ===
Fragment or scroll identifier	Fragment or scroll name	Alternative identifier	English Bible Association	Language	Date/script	Description	Reference
Nahal Hever Cave 8
Nahal Hever Numbers^{a}	Numbers		Numbers 19:2-4, 20:6-7	Hebrew			
Numbers			Numbers 27:2-13, 28:11-12	Hebrew			
Nahal Hever Deuteronomy	Deuteronomy		Deuteronomy 9:4-7,21-23	Hebrew			
Nahal Hever Psalms	Psalms		Psalms 7:12–17; 8:1, 3–9; 9:12–21; 10:1–6, 8–10, 18; 11:1–5; 12:5–8; 13:1–2; 14:2–4; 15:1–5; 16:1; 18:5–12, 16–35, 37–42; 22:3–8; 14–20; 23:2–6; 24:1–2; 25:4–7; 29:2; 30:2; 31:1–21	Hebrew			
Nahal Hever Greek Minor Prophets	Minor Prophets		Jonah 1:14–17; 2:1–6; 3:1–10; 4:1–2, 5; Micah 1:1–8; 2:7–8; 3:5–6; 4:3–10; 5:2–7; Nahum 1:13–14; 2:4–11; 3:3–16; Habakkuk 1:5–17; 2:1–8, 13–20; 3:8–15; Zephaniah 1:1–6, 13–18; 2:9–10; 3:6–7; Zechariah 1:1–4, 12–14, 19–21; 2:3–5, 7–8, 12–13; 3:	Greek			

=== Masada ===
Fragment or scroll identifier	Fragment or scroll name	Alternative identifier	English Bible Association	Language	Date/script	Description	Reference
Masada
Masada Genesis	Genesis	MasGen	Genesis 46:7–11	Hebrew			
Masada Leviticus^{a}	Leviticus	MasLev^{a}	Leviticus 4:3–9	Hebrew			
Masada Leviticus^{b}	Leviticus	MasLev^{b}	Leviticus 8:31, 33–34; 9:1–10, 12–13, 22–24; 10:1, 9–20; 11:1–21, 23–40	Hebrew			
Masada Deuteronomy	Deuteronomy	MasDeut	Deuteronomy 33:17–24; 34:2–6	Hebrew			
Masada Psalms^{a}	Psalms	MasPsalms^{a}	Psalms 81–85, ending with 85:5	Hebrew			
Masada Psalms^{b}	Psalms	MasPsalms^{b}	Psalms 150	Hebrew			
Masada Ezekiel	Ezekiel	MasEzek	Ezekiel 35:11–15; 36:1–10, 13–14, 17–35; 37:1–14, 16, 23, 28; 38:1–4, 7–8	Hebrew			
Masada Sirach	Sirach	MasSir	Sir 39:27–32; 40:8, 11–20, 26–30; 41:1–43:21; 43:23–25, 30; 44:1–15, 17	Hebrew	Hasmonean		

== See also ==
- Biblical manuscripts
- Septuagint manuscripts
- List of Hebrew Bible manuscripts
