= 4Q240 =

4Q240 ( or 4QCant^{a}) is believed to be a commentary (or pesher) on the Song of Songs, also known as 'Canticles'. Written in Hebrew, it was found in Cave 4 at Qumran in the Judean Desert and comprises part of the Dead Sea Scrolls. From its palaeography (script) it has been identified as being early-Herodian.

== Location ==
Included in Milik's original list, but this fragment has never been located.

== See also ==
- List of Hebrew Bible manuscripts
- Dead Sea Scrolls
- 4Q106
- 4Q107
- 4Q108
- 4QMMT
- 6Q6
- Tanakh at Qumran
