= List of manuscripts from Qumran Cave 9 =

List of the manuscripts from Qumran Cave 9
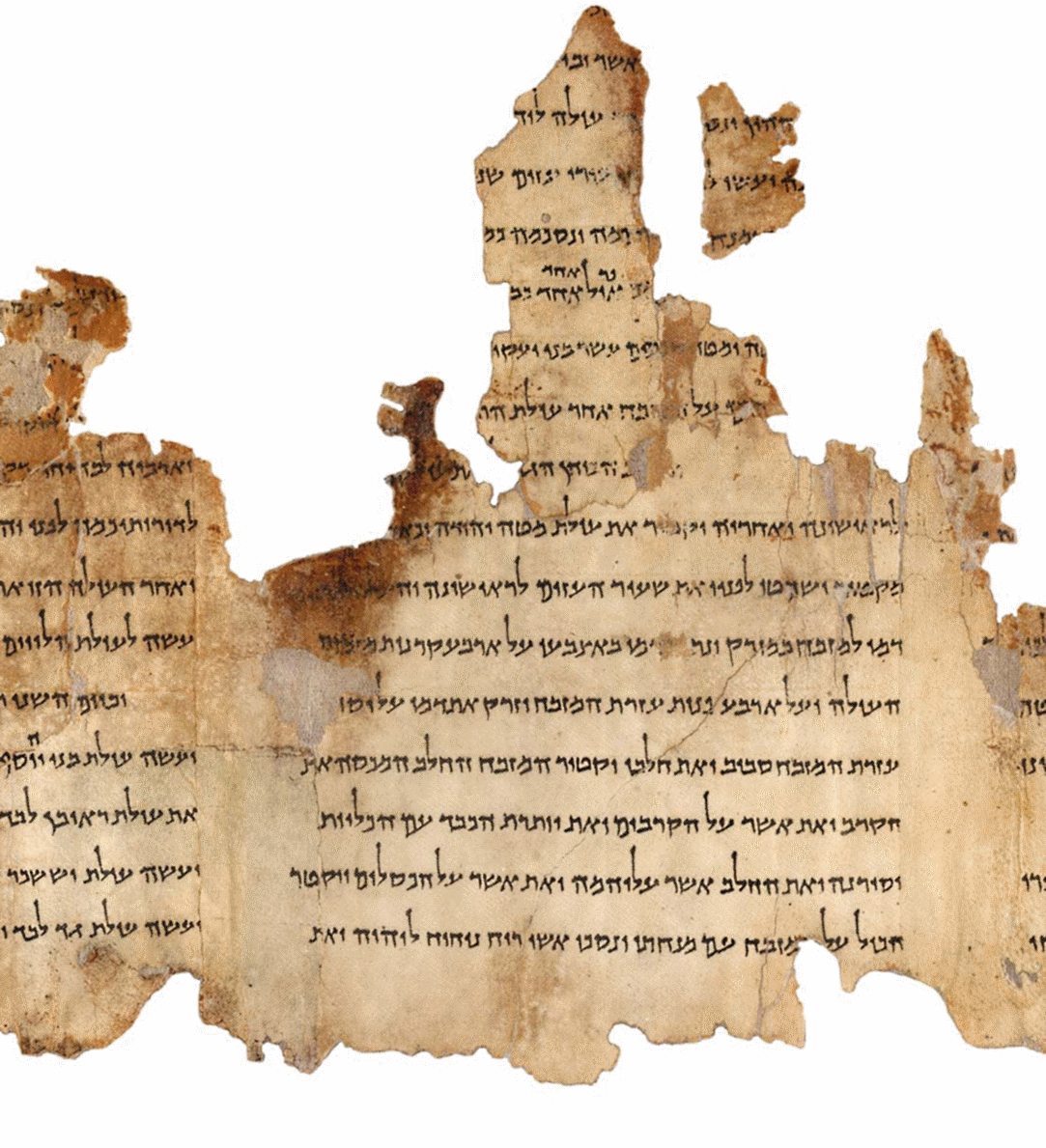
- A view of part of the Temple Scroll that was found in Qumran Cave 11.
- Material: Papyrus
- Writing: Hebrew
- Created: unknown
- Discovered: 1957
- Present location: Qumran

The following is a list of the Dead Sea Scrolls from the cave 9 near Qumran.

== Description ==
Wadi Qumran Cave 9, along with caves 7 and 8, was one of the only caves that are accessible by passing through the settlement at Qumran. Carved into the southern end of the Qumran plateau, Cave 9 was excavated by archaeologists in 1957. There was only one fragment of Dead Sea Scrolls found in Cave 9.

== List of manuscripts ==
Some resources for more complete information on the Dead Sea Scrolls are the book by Emanuel Tov, "Revised Lists of the Texts from the Judaean Desert" for a complete list of all of the Dead Sea Scroll texts, as well as the online webpages for the Shrine of the Book and the Leon Levy Collection, both of which present photographs and images of the scrolls and fragments themselves for closer study. Information is not always comprehensive, as content for many scrolls has not yet been fully published.

Fragment or scroll identifier	Fragment or scroll name	Alternative identifier	English Bible Association	Language	Date/script	Description	Reference
Qumran Cave 9
9Qpap	Unidentified	9Q1		Hebrew	Roman	Written on papyrus.	

== See also ==
- Biblical manuscripts
- Septuagint manuscripts
- List of Hebrew Bible manuscripts
