= The Voice of the Turtle =

The Voice of the Turtle may refer to:

- The Voice of the Turtle (play), 1943, by John William Van Druten
  - The Voice of the Turtle (film), 1947, based on the stage play
- The Voice of the Turtle (album), 1968, by American folk musician John Fahey
- "Voice of the Turtle", a song by John Fahey on his album America
- Voice of the Turtle, a musical group specializing in Sephardic music
- "The Voice of the Turtle", a short story by W. Somerset Maugham, published in the collection The Mixture as Before
- "The Voice of the Turtle", an episode of the television series Oh, Brother!

== See also ==
- "And the Voice of the Turtle...", a short story by Sterling E. Lanier, published in the collection The Curious Quests of Brigadier Ffellowes
- The Song of Songs, the source of the phrase
