= 4Q107 =

4Q107 (4QCant^{b}) is a fragment of the Song of Songs (2:9‑17; 3:1‑2, 5, 9‑11; 4:1‑3, 8‑11, 14‑16; 5:1) in Hebrew found in Cave 4 at Qumran in the Judean Desert in Israel and which comprises part of the Dead Sea Scrolls. The script on the fragment has been identified as early-Herodian (c.30 BCE-30 CE). The scribe responsible for 4Q107 did not write 4Q108 as there are differences in writing style. Also, the lacuna in the second column of 4Q107 does not provide enough space to accommodate 4Q108. The fragments which make up the Song of Songs found at Qumran are numbered 4Q106, 4Q107, 4Q108, and 6Q6. The scroll 4Q240 is possibly a commentary on the Song of Songs.

Emmanuel Tov once argued that 4Q107 is a liturgical text, later changed his assessment to a text for private use, and then abstained from any identification of the use of the text, a position that other scholars have also reached.

== Texts Included ==
This text includes four units of text from the Song of Songs.

Fragment	Song of Songs verses	Notes
Frag. 1	2:9-3:2	
Frag. 2 i	3:4-5, 9-11	Omits 3:6-8
Frag. 2 ii	4:1-3, 8-11	Omits 4:4-7
Frag. 3	4:14-5:1	

== See also ==
- List of Hebrew Bible manuscripts
- Dead Sea Scrolls
- 4Q106
- 4Q108
- 4Q240
- 6Q6
- Tanakh at Qumran
