= Song of Songs =

Book of the Hebrew Bible and the Christian Old Testament

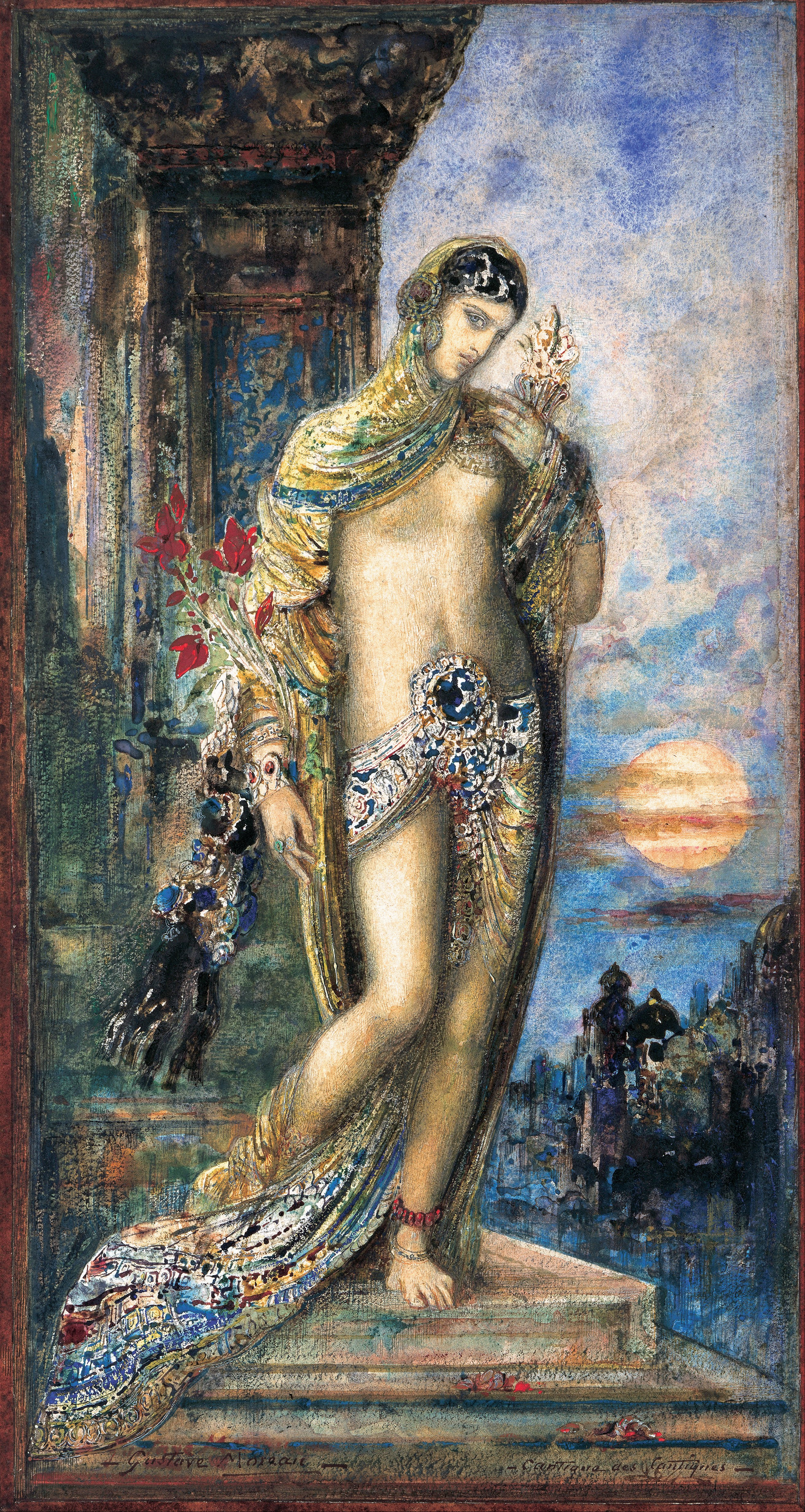
Song of Songs (Cantique des Cantiques) by Gustave Moreau, 1893

The Song of Songs (Biblical Hebrew: שִׁיר הַשִּׁירִים, romanized: Šīr hašŠīrīm), also called the Canticle of Canticles or the Song of Solomon, is a biblical poem, one of the five megillot ("scrolls") in the Ketuvim ("writings"), the last section of the Tanakh. Unlike other books in the Hebrew Bible, it is erotic poetry; lovers express passionate desire, exchange compliments, and invite one another to enjoy. The poem narrates an intense, poetic love story between a woman and her lover through a series of sensual dialogues, dreams, metaphors, and warnings to the "daughters of Jerusalem" not to awaken love before its time.

Modern scholarship tends to hold that the lovers in the Song are unmarried, which accords with its ancient Near East context. The women of Jerusalem form a chorus to the lovers, functioning as an audience whose participation in the lovers' erotic encounters facilitates the participation of the reader.

Most scholars view the Song of Songs as erotic poetry celebrating human love, not a divine metaphor, with some seeing influences from fertility cults and wisdom literature. Its authorship, date, and origins remain uncertain, with scholars debating its unity, structure, and possible influences from Mesopotamian, Egyptian, and Greek love poetry. Most scholars date it to the 3rd century BCE.

Many Jews read the Song during Passover, a custom first recorded in 8th-century Jund Filastin. Jewish tradition interprets it as an allegory of the relationship between God and Israel. In Christianity, it is viewed as an allegory of Christ and his bride, the Church. The Song of Songs has inspired diverse works in art, film, theater, and literature, including pieces by Marc Chagall, Carl Theodor Dreyer, Toni Morrison, John Steinbeck, and Neil Diamond.

== Structure ==
There is widespread consensus that, although the book has no plot, it does have what can be called a framework, indicated by the links between its beginning and end. Beyond this, however, there appears to be little agreement: attempts to find a chiastic structure have not found acceptance, and analyses dividing the book into units have employed various methods, yielding diverse conclusions.

The following indicative schema is from Kugler and Hartin's An Introduction to The Bible:

- Introduction Song of Songs 1:1–1:6
- Dialogue between the lovers Song of Songs 1:7–2:7
- The woman recalls a visit from her lover Song of Songs 2:8–2:17
- The woman addresses the daughters of Zion Song of Songs 3:1–3:5
- Sighting a royal wedding procession Song of Songs 3:6–3:11
- The man describes his lover's beauty Song of Songs 3:6–5:1
- The woman addresses the daughters of Jerusalem Song of Songs 5:2–6:4
- The man describes his lover, who visits him Song of Songs 6:5–6:12
- Observers describe the woman's beauty Song of Songs 6:13–8:4
- Appendix Song of Songs 8:5–8:14

== Title ==
The introduction calls the poem "the song of songs", a phrase that follows an idiomatic construction commonly found in Scriptural Hebrew to indicate the object's status as the greatest and most beautiful of its class (as in Holy of Holies). The work is also referred to as the "Song of Solomon", meaning the song "of", "by", "for", or "[dedicated] to" Solomon.

== Summary ==
The poem proper begins with the woman's expression of desire for her lover and her self-description to the "daughters of Jerusalem": she insists on her sun-born blackness, likening it to the "tents of Kedar" (nomads) and the "curtains of Solomon". A dialogue between the lovers follows: the woman asks the man to meet; he replies with a lightly teasing tone. The two compete in offering flattering compliments ("my beloved is to me as a cluster of henna blossoms in the vineyards of En Gedi", "an apple tree among the trees of the wood", "a lily among brambles", while the bed they share is like a forest canopy). The section closes with the woman telling the daughters of Jerusalem not to stir up love such as hers until it is ready.

The woman recalls a visit from her lover in the springtime. She uses imagery from a shepherd's life, and she says of her lover that "he pastures his flock among the lilies".

The woman again addresses the daughters of Jerusalem, describing her fervent and ultimately successful search for her lover through the night-time streets of the city. When she finds him she takes him almost by force into the chamber in which she was conceived. (Note: The action of the conception is attributed specifically and exclusively to the woman's mother.) She reveals that this is a dream, seen on her "bed at night", and ends by again warning the daughters of Jerusalem "not to stir up love until it is ready".

The next section reports a royal wedding procession. Solomon is mentioned by name, and the daughters of Jerusalem are invited to come out and see the spectacle.

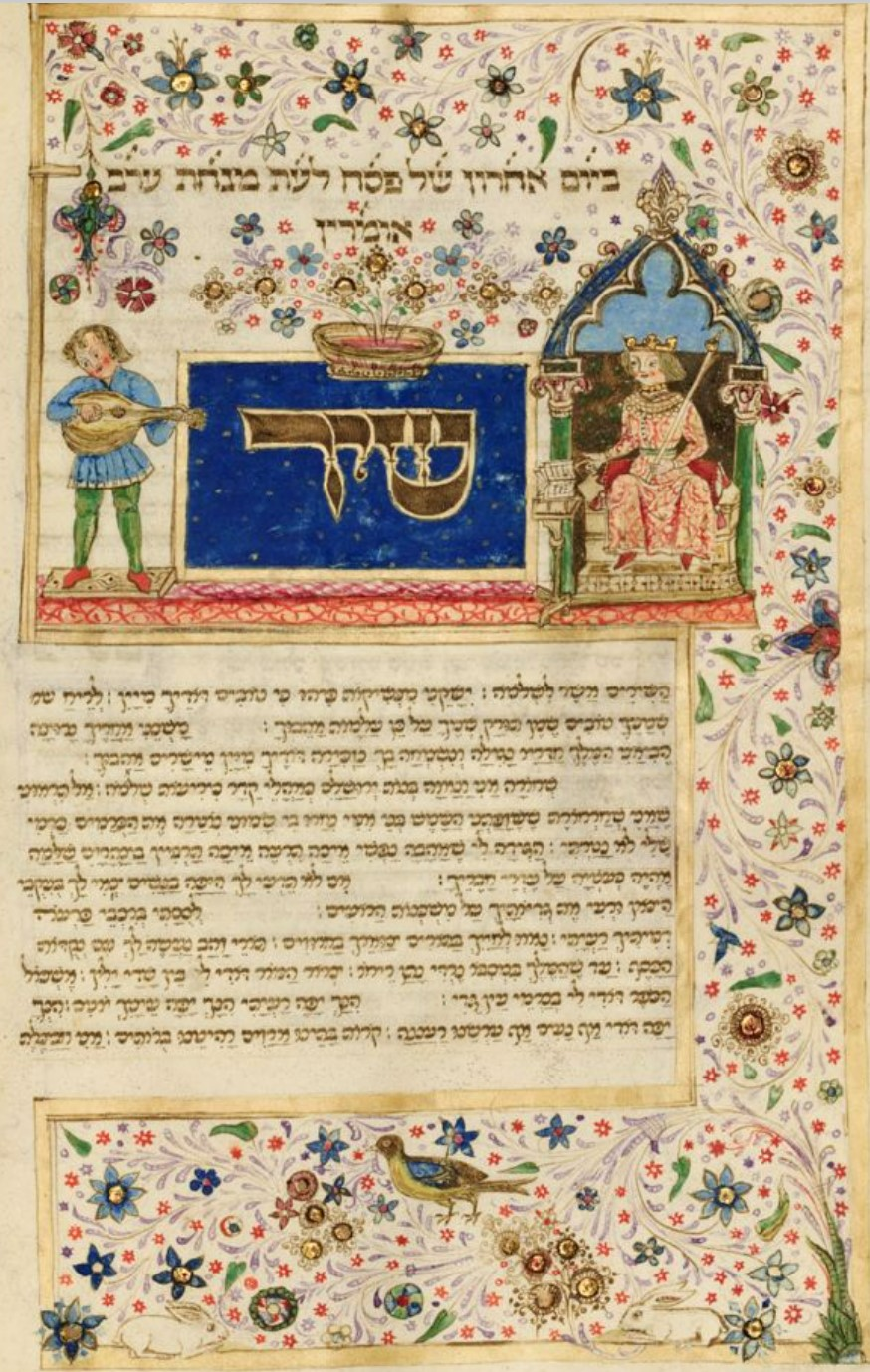
Illustration for the first verse, a minstrel playing before Solomon (15th century Rothschild Mahzor)

The man describes his beloved: Her eyes are like doves, her hair is like a flock of goats, her teeth like shorn ewes, and so on from face to breasts. Place-names feature heavily: her neck is like the Tower of David, her smell like the scent of Lebanon. He hastens to summon his beloved, saying that he is ravished by even a single glance. The section becomes a "garden poem", in which he describes her as a "locked garden" (usually taken to mean that she is chaste). The woman invites the man to enter the garden and taste the fruits. The man accepts the invitation, and a third party tells them to eat, drink, "and be drunk with love".

The woman tells the daughters of Jerusalem of another dream. She was in her chamber when her lover knocked. She was slow to open, and when she did, he was gone. She searched through the streets again, but this time she failed to find him and the watchmen, who had helped her before, now beat her. She asks the daughters of Jerusalem to help her find him, and describes his physical good looks. Eventually, she admits her lover is in his garden, safe from harm, and committed to her as she is to him.

The man describes his beloved; the woman describes a rendezvous they have shared. (The last part is unclear and possibly corrupted.)

The people praise the beauty of the woman. The images are the same as those used elsewhere in the poem, but with an unusually dense use of place-names, e.g., pools of Hebron, gate of Bath-rabbim, tower of Damascus, etc. The man states his intention to enjoy the fruits of the woman's garden. The woman invites him to a tryst in the fields. She once more warns the daughters of Jerusalem against waking love until it is ready.

The woman compares love to death and Sheol: love is as relentless and jealous as these two, and cannot be quenched by any force. She summons her lover, using the language used before: he should come "like a gazelle or a young stag upon the mountain of spices".

== Composition ==
Song of Songs offers no explicit reference to its author or to the date, place, or circumstances of its composition. The superscription states that it is "Solomon's", but even if this is meant to identify the author, it cannot be read as strictly as a similar modern statement.

Since the 1800s, “most scholars” have dated it to the 3rd century BCE. The most reliable evidence for its date is its language: Aramaic gradually replaced Hebrew after the end of the Babylonian exile in the late 6th century BCE, and the evidence of vocabulary, morphology, idiom and syntax clearly point to a late date, centuries after King Solomon to whom it is traditionally attributed. It has parallels with Mesopotamian and Egyptian love poetry from the first half of the 1st millennium, and with the pastoral idylls of Theocritus, a Greek poet who wrote in the first half of the 3rd century BCE; as a result of these conflicting signs, speculation ranges from the 10th to the 2nd centuries BCE, with the language supporting a date around the 3rd century. Other scholars are more skeptical about the idea that the language demands a post-exilic date.

Debate continues on the unity or disunity of the book. Those who see it as an anthology or collection point to the abrupt shifts of scene, speaker, subject matter and mood, and the lack of obvious structure or narrative. Those who hold it to be a single poem point out that it has no internal signs of composite origins, and view the repetitions and similarities among its parts as evidence of unity. Some claim to find a conscious artistic design underlying it, but there is no agreement among them on what this might be. The question, therefore, remains unresolved.

The poem seems to be rooted in festive performance, and connections have been proposed with the "sacred marriage" of Ishtar and Tammuz.

== Genre ==
The consensus among contemporary scholars of the Bible is that the Song of Songs is an erotic poem, and not an elaborate metaphor.

In his commentary for the Anchor Bible Series, Marvin H. Pope describes the Song as a fertility cult liturgy, rooted in the fertility cults of the ancient Near Eastern cultures of Mesopotamia and Canaan, as well as their sacred marriage rites and funeral feasts.

J. Cheryl Exum wrote: "The erotic desire of its protagonists, everywhere evident in the Song, leads me, in conclusion, to the Song's unique contribution to the conceptualization of love in the Bible: its romantic vision of love".

The historian and rabbi Shaye J. D. Cohen summarizes:

Song of Songs [is a] collection of love poems sung by him to her and her to him: [– –] While authorship is ascribed to Solomon in its first verse and by traditionalists, [modern Bible scholarship] argues that while the book may contain ancient material, there is no evidence that Solomon wrote it.

[– –] What is a collection of erotic poems doing in the Hebrew Bible? Indeed, some ancient rabbis were uneasy about the book’s inclusion in the canon.

Several scholars have also argued that, alongside its condition as love poetry, the Song of Songs also shares a number of features with Wisdom literature. For instance, Jennifer L. Andruska argues that the Song employs a number of literary conventions typical of this didactic literature and that it combines features of both ancient Near Eastern love song and wisdom genres to produce a wisdom literature about romantic love, instructing readers to pursue what she describes as a particular type of "wise love" relationship, modelled by the lovers of the poem. Likewise, Katharine J. Dell notes a number of Wisdom motifs in the Song such as parallels between the lovers and the advices and conduct of Woman Wisdom and the Loose Woman of Proverbs, among others.

== Canonisation and interpretation ==
=== Judaism ===
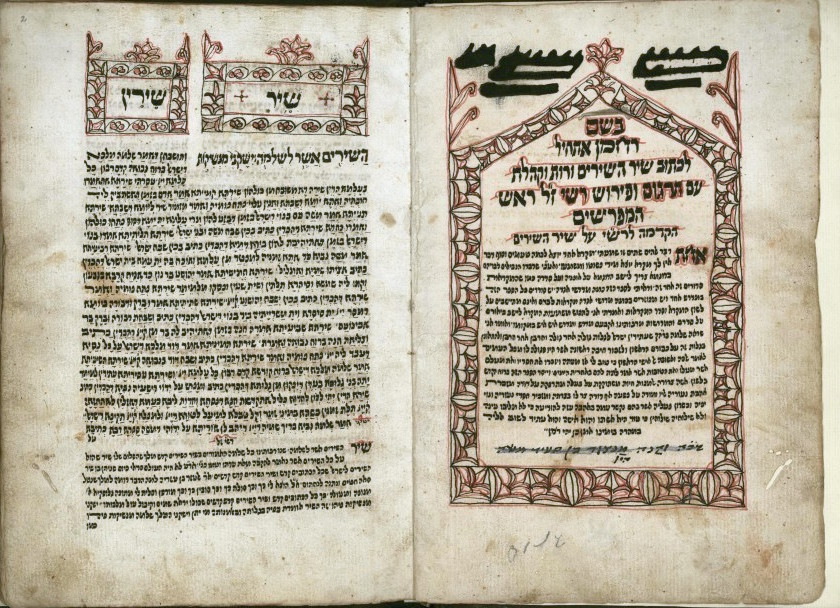
A page of Rashi's interpretation of the megillot, National Library of Israel

The Song was accepted into the Jewish canon of scripture and was understood as "an allegory for the love between God and Israel", a view "dominant for a thousand years and more". However, according to Catholic priest Fr. Andrew Greeley, Song of Songs is "secular love poetry, a collection of love songs gathered around a single theme" and scholarship has "routed the allegorical interpretation". Although "there is a tradition that even this book was considered as one to be excluded", as stated in Aboth d'Rabbi Nathan A1, a 700–900 CE work, the Song of Songs was not only included but regarded as "especially meritorious". Reform Jewish Rabbi Solomon Freehof notes that one must think "if the book is so gross ... unlike all other books of the Bible tradition [...] why accept it at all?"

Canonicity was tied to its attribution to Solomon, and based on an allegorical reading where the subject matter was taken to be not sexual desire but God's love for Israel. For instance, the famed first and second century Rabbi Akiva forbade the use of the Song of Songs in popular celebrations. He reportedly said, "He who sings the Song of Songs in wine taverns, treating it as if it were a vulgar song, forfeits his share in the world to come". However, Rabbi Akiva famously defended the canonicity of the Song of Songs, reportedly saying when the question came up of whether it should be considered a defiling work, "God forbid! [...] For all of eternity in its entirety is not as worthy as the day on which Song of Songs was given to Israel, for all the Writings are holy, but Song of Songs is the Holy of Holies."

Other rabbinic scholars who have employed allegorical exegesis in explaining the meaning of Song of Songs are Tobiah ben Eliezer, author of Lekach Tov, and Zechariah ha-Rofé, author of Midrash ha-Hefez. The French rabbi Rashi did not believe the Song of Songs to be an erotic poem.

Song of Songs is one of the overtly mystical Biblical texts for the Kabbalah, which gave an esoteric interpretation on all the Hebrew Bible. Following the dissemination of the Zohar in the 13th century, Jewish mysticism took on a metaphorically anthropomorphic erotic element, and Song of Songs is an example of this. In Zoharic Kabbalah, God is represented by a system of ten sephirot emanations, each symbolizing a different attribute of God, comprising both male and female. The Shechina (indwelling Divine presence) was identified with the feminine sephira Malchut, the vessel of Kingship. This symbolizes the Jewish people, and in the body, the female form, identified with the woman in Song of Songs. Her beloved was identified with the male sephira Tiferet, the "Holy One Blessed be He", a central principle in the beneficent heavenly flow of divine emotion. In the body, this represents the male torso, uniting through the sephira Yesod of the male sign of the covenant organ of procreation.

Through beneficent deeds and Jewish observance, the Jewish people restore cosmic harmony in the divine realm, healing the exile of the Shechina with God's transcendence, revealing the essential unity of God. This elevation of the world is aroused from above on the Sabbath, a foretaste of the redeemed purpose of Creation. The text thus became a description, depending on the aspect, of the creation of the world, the passage of Shabbat, the covenant with Israel, and the coming of the Messianic age. "Lecha Dodi", a 16th-century liturgical song with strong Kabbalistic symbolism, contains many passages, including its opening two words, taken directly from Song of Songs.

In modern Judaism, certain verses from the Song are read on Shabbat eve or at Passover, which marks the beginning of the grain harvest as well as commemorating the Exodus from Egypt, to symbolize the love between the Jewish people and their God. Jewish tradition reads it as an allegory of the relationship between God and Israel. The entire Song of Songs in its original Hebrew is read in synagogues during the intermediate days of Passover. It is often read from a scroll similar to a Torah scroll in style. It is also read in its entirety by some at the end of the Passover Seder and is usually printed in most Hagadahs. Some Jews have the custom to recite the entire book prior to the onset of the Jewish Sabbath.

=== Christianity ===
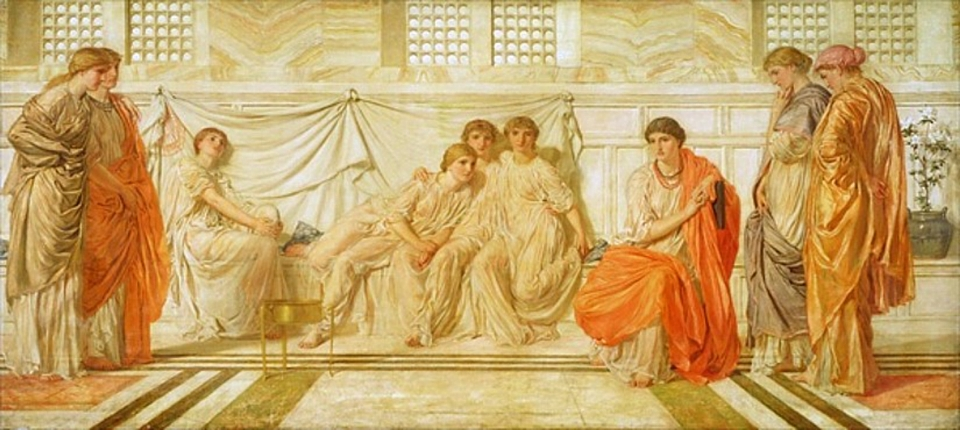
The Shulamite by Albert Joseph Moore (1864)

The literal subject of the Song of Songs is love and sexual longing between a man and a woman, and it has little (or nothing) to say about the relationship of God and man; in order to find such a meaning it was necessary to turn to allegory, treating the love that the Song celebrates as an analogy for the love between God and Church. The Christian church's interpretation of the Song as evidence of God's love for his people, both collectively and individually, began with Origen. Saint Gregory of Nyssa wrote fifteen Homilies on the Song of Songs, which are considered the pinnacle of his biblical exegesis. In them, he compares the bride to the soul and the invisible groom to God: the finite soul is incessantly reaching out towards the infinite God and remains continually disappointed in this life due to the failure to achieve ecstatic union with the beloved, a vision which enraptures and can be achieved fully and perfectly only in life after death. Similarly, following the allegoric interpretation of Ambrose of Milan, Saint Augustine of Hippo stated that the Song of Songs represents the wedding between Jesus Christ and the Catholic Church, pure and virgin, within an ascetic context.

However, going against the prevailing opinion, Theodore of Mopsuestia, influenced by the School of Antioch, interpreted the Song of Songs only literally, understanding it as an erotic poem written by Solomon to the daughter of Pharaoh. Since the allegorical view was so predominant, his interpretation was condemned at the Second Council of Constantinople. Theodore's writings on this book were lost, and only his literalist position is known, which would later (from the 18th century onwards) become predominant among biblical scholars.

Over the centuries the emphases of interpretation shifted, first reading the Song as a depiction of the love between Christ and Church, the 11th century adding a moral element, and the 12th century understanding of the Bride as the Virgin Mary, with each new reading absorbing rather than simply replacing earlier ones, so that the commentary became ever more complex.

=== The Church of Jesus Christ of Latter-day Saints ===
The Church of Jesus Christ of Latter-day Saints includes the book in its standard works, but regards it as "not inspired" in Joseph Smith's Bible translation.

=== Islam ===
Ibn Hazm (994–1064) writes that Song of Songs should be called "Folly of Follies, for it is a silly discourse which makes no sense, and no one among [the Jews] knows its meaning".

In 1869, Syed Ahmad Khan contended that the word mahamaddim in Song of Songs 5:16 refers to Muhammad, adding to older Islamic claims regarding Haggai 2:7, and this interpretation still appears in modern Islamic apologia.

=== Feminism ===
In modern times the poem has attracted the attention of feminist biblical critics, with Phyllis Trible's foundational "Depatriarchalizing in Biblical Interpretation" treating it as an exemplary text, and the Feminist Companion to the Bible series edited by Athalya Brenner and Carole Fontaine devoting two volumes to it.

== Musical settings ==
Excerpts from the book have inspired composers to write vocal and instrumental compositions, including:

- "Come live with me" (1981) by James Dillon, setting of Song of Songs (in Hebrew) for mezzo-soprano, flute, oboe, piano and percussion (1 player), London: Edition Peters
- "Chi e costei", a setting of "Song of Songs" 6:10 in Il Primo libro delle musiche a 1–2 voci e basso continuo (1618) by Francesca Caccini
- Symphoniae sacrae I (1629) by Heinrich Schütz
- A'l Mishkavi Baleylot for soprano and harp (1992) and Spring Calls for soprano and ensemble (2006) by Lior Navok
- Alex Weiser's After Shir Hashirim (2017) draws its inspiration from the text and cantillation of the Song of Songs.
- Andrew Rose Gregory of The Gregory Brothers released the album The Song of Songs, with words and music based on the biblical text, with The Color Red Band in 2011.
- German group Popol Vuh named their 1975 album Das Hohelied Salomos after this text.
- Animals As Leaders's 2009 self-titled album includes a track titled "Song of Solomon".
- "Asma Asmaton" from the 1986 album Rapsodies by Vangelis and Irene Papas.
- "Κραταία ως θάνατος αγάπη" from the album Magnus Eroticus (Μεγάλος Ερωτικός) by Manos Hadjidakis.
- C'est un jardin secret... for solo viola (1976) by Tristan Murail
- Canticum Canticorum by Giovanni Pierluigi da Palestrina: 29 five-part a cappella pieces in fourth volume of motets (1584)
- David Lang's "Just (After Song of Songs)" (2014) was premiered in 2014 by Trio Mediaeval and Garth Knox Saltarello Trio. The piece is featured in the film Youth by Paolo Sorrentino.
- Dieterich Buxtehude's Membra Jesu Nostri: Cantata VI, Vulnerasti Cor Meum (1680)
- Eliza Gilkyson's "Rose of Sharon" on her 2007 album Your Town Tonight is based on her reading of "Song of Songs" in a hotel room Gideon Bible, as explained in her intro to the song
- Flos Campi by Ralph Vaughan Williams, a suite for solo viola, small chorus and small orchestra (1925), each movement headed by a verse from the book
- J. S. Bach's Wachet auf, ruft uns die Stimme, BWV 140, while mainly based on the Parable of the Ten Virgins, also uses words and imagery from the Song of Songs.
- John Zorn's "Shir Ha-Shirim" premiered in February 2008. The piece is inspired by the "Song of Songs" and is performed by an amplified quintet of female singers with female and male narrators performing the Song of Solomon. A performance at the Guggenheim Museum in November 2008 featured choreography for paired dancers from the Khmer Arts Ensemble by Sophiline Cheam Shapiro. In 2013 a new version featuring the five singers without the two narrators premièred in NYC at Alice Tully Hall and at the Jerusalem Sacred Music Festival and released on the album Shir Hashirim.
- Kate Bush's "Song of Solomon" from her album The Red Shoes (1993) includes lyrics which quote and reference the Song of Songs.
- Le Cantique des Cantiques (1952) by Jean-Yves Daniel-Lesur
- Lyubov Streicher (1888–1958) composed a musical setting for the Song of Songs.
- In "Columba Mea" Opus 78, published by Novello, Kenneth Leighton set substantial sections of the biblical text to music for vocal soloists, chorus, strings, celesta and harpsichord.
- Nightstone (1979) for voice and piano by Arnold Rosner
- Rami Bar-Niv's Uri Tsafon (Song of Songs 4, 16: Awake, North Wind) (1972)
- Song of Solomon (1989) by Steve Kilbey
- Subject of the song "I Hate Heaven" by The Residents, which is featured in their 1998 Bible inspired album Wormwood.
- The chorus of Stephen Duffy's 1985 song "Kiss Me" was based on the comparison of wine to love in Song of Songs.
- The opening track "Glass" from the 2009 album Two Suns by Bat For Lashes begins with a line from the Song of Songs.
- Song of Solomon (2017) classical wedding suite composition for orchestra, organ and two voices by Chris M. Allport
- Norwegian composer Ola Gjeilo uses the Latin verses 6:3–4a (Pulchra es) from Song of Solomon in his choral piece "Northern Lights" (2008).
- American rock band Title Fight has a song entitled "Rose of Sharon" on their 2015 album Hyperview. The "Rose of Sharon" is from Song of Songs 2:1.
- American jazz vocalist and songwriter Cassandra Wilson wrote the song "Solomon Sang", included on her 1995 album New Moon Daughter.

== In popular culture ==
=== Art ===
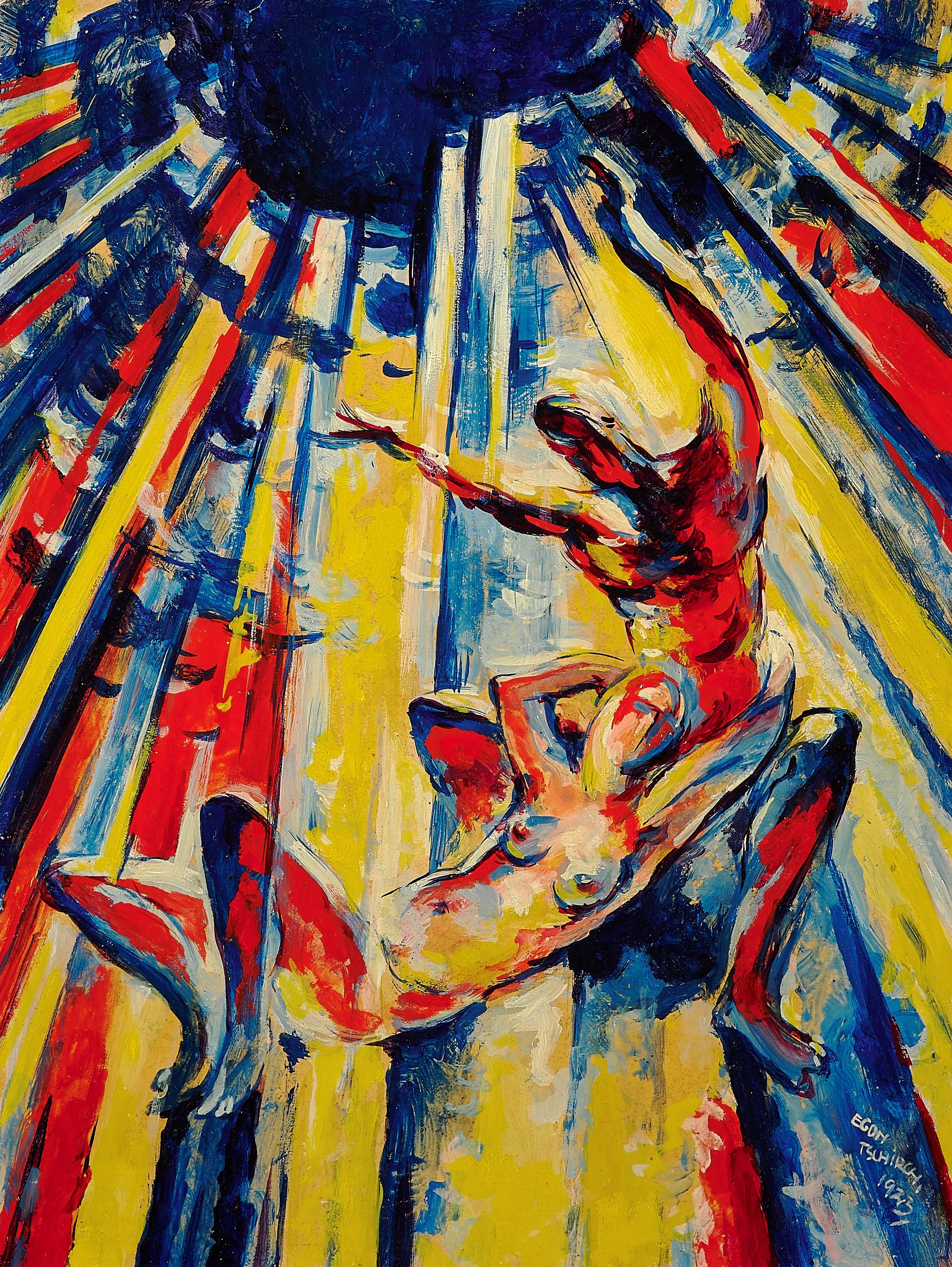
Egon Tschirch: Song of Songs, No. 11 (picture cycle 1923)

- Catherine L. Morris' 2009 collection The Song of Songs: A Love Poem Illustrated presents a series of paintings that visualize the book.
- Egon Tschirch's Song of Solomon, a 1923 expressionist nineteen-picture cycle, was rediscovered in 2015.
- Marc Chagall's Song of Songs, a five-painting cycle painted between 1957 and 1966, is housed in the Marc Chagall Museum in Nice.

=== Theater and film ===
- S. Ansky's 1916 play The Dybbuk contains a recitation of the "Song of Songs" by Khanan's father when he is a young yeshiva boy. This becomes a major plot point in the play as it allows for the two lovers to identify the promise of marriage that their fathers made as classmates before departing.
- In the 1933 film The Song of Songs, Marlene Dietrich's character Lily references the Song of Songs multiple times, aligning herself with its heroine, and throughout the film the passage is quoted.
- Lillian Hellman's 1939 play The Little Foxes (and the 1941 film adaptation) gets its title from Song 2:15: "Take us the foxes, the little foxes, that spoil the vines: for our vines have tender grapes".
- In Carl Theodor Dreyer's Day of Wrath, a 1943 film about sexual repression in a puritanical Protestant family, the first few verses of "Song of Songs" chapter 2 are read aloud by the daughter Anne, but soon after her father forbids her to continue. The chapter's verse paraphrases Anne's own amorous adventures and desires.
- In The Woman in the Window (1944), the character played by Edward G. Robinson reads "The Song of Songs" prior to his romantic entanglement with Joan Bennett.
- Several works have taken their name from the phrase "the voice of the turtle", found in 2:10–13.
- The 1986 Malayalam classic film Namukku Parkkan Munthirithoppukal uses several verses from the "Song of Songs" which forms one of its major plot elements.
- The 2005 film Keeping Mum sees the character Walter Goodfellow, played by Rowan Atkinson, read several verses from the "Song of Songs", encouraging him later on to sleep once more with his wife Gloria, saving his waning marriage.
- The 2014 film The Song is based on the "Song of Songs".
- Agnes Borinsky's 2022 play A Song of Songs was inspired by the book and reinterpreted it through a queer lens.

=== Novels ===
- Rose of Sharon (an epithet in the Song) is a major character in John Steinbeck's 1939 novel The Grapes of Wrath.
- In Elizabeth Smart's 1945 novel of prose poetry By Grand Central Station I Sat Down and Wept, several lines of the Song are spoken by the protagonist while she undergoes police questioning about her relationship with her companion, poet George Barker.
- Leon Garfield's 1976 masterwork The Pleasure Garden concludes with a reading of the first three chapters of the Song.
- The song is mentioned repeatedly in Sholem Aleichem's Jewish Children.
- Toni Morrison's 1977 novel is entitled Song of Solomon.
- The 2026 novel Y by Elea and Zeno Zoe contains a new translation or remake of the Song of Songs and discusses its ancient prosody and connections to Pharaonic Egypt based on research in ancient music.

== See also ==
- Dead Sea Scrolls 4Q106, 4Q107, 4Q108, 6Q6, fragments including portions of the "Song of Songs".
- Hortus conclusus
- Ivory tower

== Notes ==
Song of Songs Hebrew poetry
Preceded by Job	Hebrew Bible	Succeeded by Ruth
Preceded by Ecclesiastes	Protestant Old Testament	Succeeded by Isaiah
Preceded by Ecclesiastes	Roman Catholic Old Testament	Succeeded by Book of Wisdom
Preceded by Ecclesiastes	E. Orthodox [Old Testament]	Succeeded by Book of Wisdom
