= 6Q6 =

6Q6 is a small portion of a scroll from Cave 6 at Qumran, containing Song of Songs 1:1-7 in Hebrew. Together with three scroll portions found in Cave 4, they comprise the total witness to the Song from the Dead Sea Scrolls. It is dated to about 50 CE.

== See also ==
- List of Hebrew Bible manuscripts
- 4Q106 = 4QCant^{a}
- 4Q107 = 4QCant^{b}
- 4Q108 = 4QCant^{c}
- Biblical manuscript
- Tanakh at Qumran
