= 4Q108 =

4Q108 (or 4QCant^{c}) is a fragment containing a portion of the Song of Songs (3:7–8) in Hebrew. Fragments from three such scrolls were found in Cave 4 at Qumran. These, and 6Q6 from Cave 6, estimated from 2nd century BCE, comprise the total witness to the Song from the Dead Sea Scrolls, known so far.

== Identification ==
It is evident that 4Q108 is not from the other two manuscripts of the Song found in the cave. The last two words of Song 3:7, g'bore Israel ("warriors of Israel") are already accounted for in 4Q106; and the letters of 4Q107 are formed by an observably different hand to 4Q108. The manner of composition (ductus) of the letters aleph and shin differs between the manuscripts. Additionally, the lacuna in the second column of 4Q107 does not provide enough space to accommodate 4Q108.

== Contents ==
4Q108 is a "tiny fragment" containing only ten letters from two lines — five letters each from verses seven and eight of chapter three. The five letters from verse seven are: למה (lmh), the last three letters of the name Solomon; and שש (šš) (shesh), the six in the word sixty. The five letters from verse eight are a single word אחוזי (’ăḥūzî), the passive participle of the verb meaning grasp. So 4Q108 reads:

- [^{7}Behold the seat of So]lomon six[ty warriors surrounding it, from the warriors of]
- [Israel, ^{8}all of them] equipped [with sword ...]

== Features ==
- The Masoretic Text spells the verb of verse eight with only four letters (אחזי); 4Q108, however, contains a consonant (vav) representing one of the distinctive vowels ([u]) of the passive participle.
- The passive construction used here — aḥuzi ḥereb (grasped of sword) — is not unique to either the Song (see Ezekiel 43:6) or to Hebrew.

== See also ==
- List of Hebrew Bible manuscripts
- Biblical manuscript
- Tanakh at Qumran
