= 4Q106 =

4Q106 (or 4QCant^{a}) is one large and three small fragments from three columns of a scroll containing portions of the Song of Songs (3:4-5, 7–11; 4:1–7; 6:11?-12; 7:1-7) in Hebrew. It is one of three scrolls found in Cave 4 at Qumran that have been reconstructed as copies of the Song of Songs. These, and 6Q6 from Cave 6, comprise the total witness to the Song from the Dead Sea Scrolls, known so far.

== Description ==
The parchment of 4Q106 is tan in colour. The text is bordered by a top margin of 1.3 cm, bottom margin of 1.5 cm and an inter-column margin averaging 1.1 cm. There is clear evidence of vertical, but not horizontal ruling. Unidentified fragment 6, which is thought to derive from 4Q106 does show evidence of horizontal ruling, which would explain the extremely regular writing of this manuscript. Ada Yardeni, in a private communication to Emanuel Tov, dated the manuscript as early Herodian.

== Contents ==
The large fragment and one of the small fragments provide the bulk of the surviving text — from column II. The two other small fragments are from columns I and III. What can be reconstructed from column I is: Song 3:4–5

- [^{3:4}... I grasped him and did no]t let him go until [I brought him to my mother's house, and into]
- [the room of the woman who conceived me. ^{5}I charge y]ou daughters [of Jerusalem ...]

From column II can be read:

- Song 3:7–4:6

From column III can be read:

- Song 4:7; Song 6:12–7:7

== See also ==
- List of Hebrew Bible manuscripts
- 4Q107 = 4QCant^{b}
- 4Q108 = 4QCant^{c}
- 6Q6 = 6QCant
- Tanakh at Qumran

== Literature ==
- Yardeni, Ada. The Book of Hebrew Script. The British Library: London, 2002. ISBN 1-58456-087-8.
