= List of manuscripts from Qumran Cave 2 =

List of the manuscripts from Qumran Cave 2
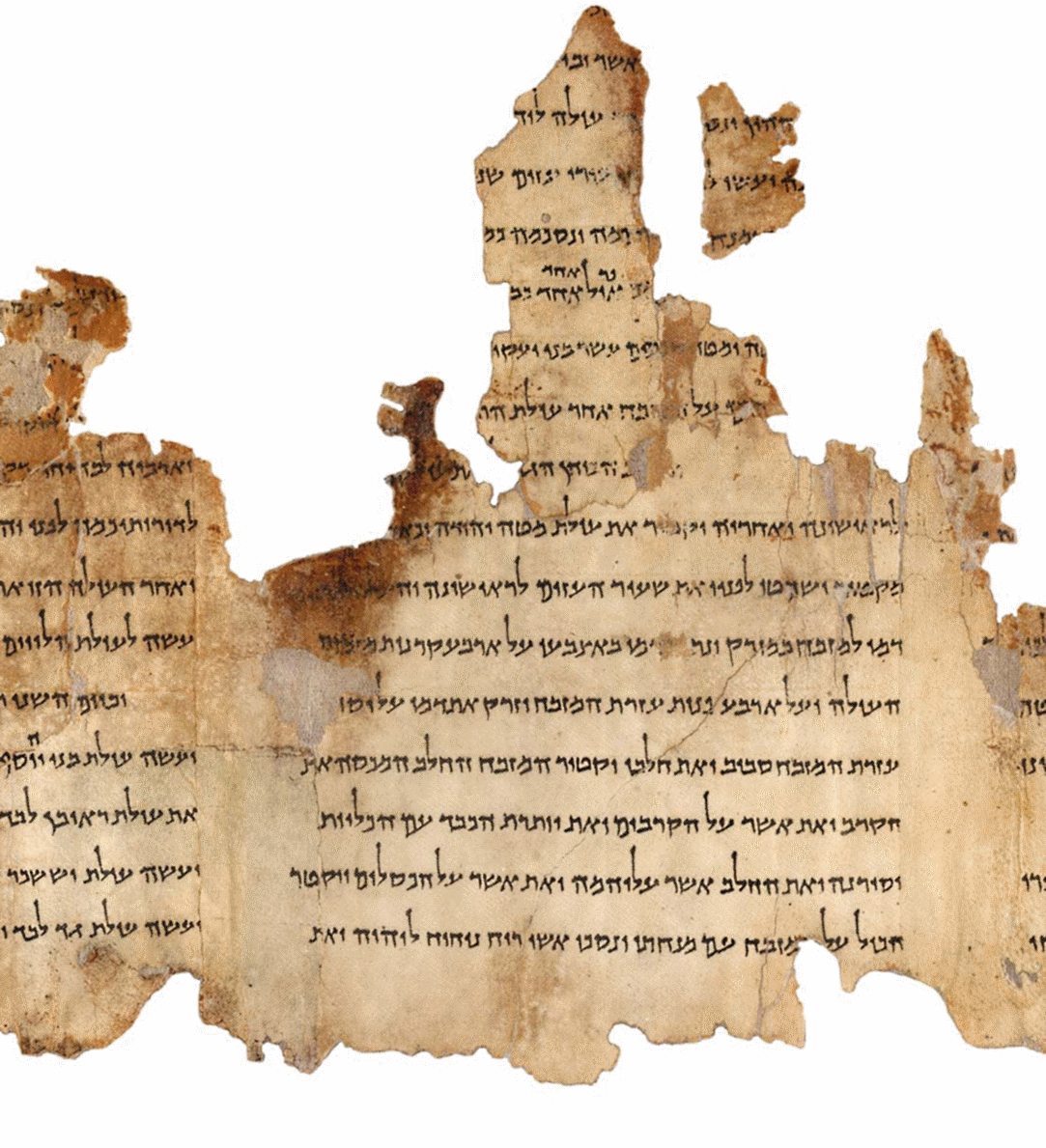
- A view of part of the Temple Scroll that was found in Qumran Cave 11.
- Material: Papyrus, Parchment, and Bronze
- Writing: Hebrew, Aramaic, and Nabataean
- Created: Est. 408 BCE to 318 CE
- Discovered: 1952
- Present location: Qumran

The following is a list of the Dead Sea Scrolls from the cave 2 near Qumran. The cave eventually yielded 300 fragments from 33 manuscripts of Dead Sea Scrolls, including fragments of Jubilees and the Wisdom of Sirach written in Hebrew.

== Description ==
Wadi Qumran Cave 2 was discovered in February 1952 and soon the Bedouin people discovered 30 fragments in it. The cave eventually yielded 300 fragments from 33 manuscripts of Dead Sea Scrolls, including fragments of Jubilees and the Wisdom of Sirach written in Hebrew.

== List of manuscripts ==
Some resources for more complete information on the Dead Sea Scrolls are the book by Emanuel Tov, "Revised Lists of the Texts from the Judaean Desert" for a complete list of all of the Dead Sea Scroll texts, as well as the online webpages for the Shrine of the Book and the Leon Levy Collection, both of which present photographs and images of the scrolls and fragments themselves for closer study. Information is not always comprehensive, as content for many scrolls has not yet been fully published.

Fragment or scroll identifier	Fragment or scroll name	Alternative identifier	English Bible Association	Language	Date/script	Description	Reference
Qumran Cave 2
2QGen	Genesis	2Q1	Genesis 19:27–28; 36:6, 35–37	Hebrew	Herodian		
2QExod^{a}	Exodus	2Q2	Exodus 1:11–14; 7:1–4; 9:27–29; 11:3–7; 12:32–41; 21:18–20(?); 26:11–13; 30:21(?), 23–25; 32:32–34	Hebrew	Herodian		
2QExod^{b}	Exodus	2Q3	Exodus 4:31; 12:26–27(?); 18:21–22; 21:37–22:2, 15–19; 27:17–19; 31:16–17; 19:9; 34:10	Hebrew	Herodian		
2QExod^{c}	Exodus	2Q4	Exodus 5:3–5	Hebrew	Hellenistic-Roman		
2QpaleoLev	Leviticus	2Q5	Leviticus 11:22–29	Hebrew	Hasmonean; Palaeo-Hebrew script		
2QNum^{a}	Numbers	2Q6	Numbers 3:38–41, 51– 4:3	Hebrew	Herodian		
2QNum^{b}	Numbers	2Q7	Numbers 33:47–53	Hebrew	Herodian		
2QNum^{c}	Numbers	2Q8	Numbers 7:88	Hebrew	Herodian		
2QNum^{d?}	Numbers	2Q9	Numbers 18:8–9	Hebrew	Hellenistic-Roman	This fragment may belong to 2Q7; possibly = Leviticus 23:1–3	
2QDeut^{a}	Deuteronomy	2Q10	Deuteronomy 1:7–9	Hebrew	50–25 BCE Late Hasmonean or Early Herodian		
2QDeut^{b}	Deuteronomy	2Q11	Deuteronomy 17:12–15	Hebrew	30 BCE – 68 CE Herodian		
2QDeut^{c}	Deuteronomy	2Q12	Deuteronomy 10:8–12	Hebrew	1–68 CE Late Herodian		
2QJer	Jeremiah	2Q13	Jeremiah 42:7–11, 14; 43:8–11; 44:1–3, 12–14; 46:27–47:7; 48:7, 25–39, 43–45; 49:10	Hebrew	Herodian	Doubtfully identified fragments: 13:22; 32:24–25; 48:2–4, 41–42	
2QPs	Psalms	2Q14	Psalm 103:2–11; 104:6–11	Hebrew	Herodian		
2QJob	Job	2Q15	Job 33:28–30	Hebrew	Herodian		
2QRuth^{a}	Ruth	2Q16	Ruth 2:13–23; 3:1–8; 4:3–4	Hebrew	Herodian		
2QRuth^{b}	Ruth	2Q17	Ruth 3:13–18	Hebrew	Hasmonean		
2QSir	"Wisdom of Sirach" or "Ecclesiasticus"	2Q18	Sir 6:14–15 (or 1:19–20); 6:20–31	Hebrew	Herodian	Ben Sira	
2QJub^{a}	Book of Jubilees	2Q19	Genesis 25:7–9	Hebrew	Herodian	Jub 23:7–8	
2QJub^{b}	Book of Jubilees	2Q20	Exodus 1:7; Genesis 50:26, 22 (different order)	Hebrew	Herodian	Jub 46:1–3	
2QapMoses /2QapocrMoses(?)	"Apocryphon of Moses"	2Q21		Hebrew	Herodian	Apocryphal writing about Moses	
2QapDavid /2QapocrDavid	"Apocryphon of David"	2Q22		Hebrew	Herodian	Apocryphal writing about David	
2QapProph /2Qapocr.Prophecy	"Apocryphal Prophecy"	2Q23		Hebrew	Herodian	Apocryphal prophetic text in six tiny fragments.	
2QNJ	"New Jerusalem"	2Q24		Aramaic	Herodian	Description of the New Jerusalem. cf. 1Q32 ar, 11Q18 ar	
2Q Juridical Text	"Juridical Text"	2Q25		Hebrew	Herodian	A juridical text	
2QEnGiants	"Book of Giants" from "Enoch"	2Q26		Aramaic	Herodian	Now known as part of the "Book of Giants". cf. 6Q8	
2Q27 2Q28 2Q29 2Q30 2Q31 2Q32 2Q33		2Q27 2Q28 2Q29 2Q30 2Q31 2Q32 2Q33				Unidentified Texts	
2QX1		2QX1				Debris in a box	

== See also ==
- Biblical manuscripts
- Septuagint manuscripts
- List of Hebrew Bible manuscripts

== Bibliography ==
- Fitzmyer, Joseph A. (2008). A Guide to the Dead Sea Scrolls and Related Literature. Grand Rapids, MI: William B. Eerdmans Publishing Company. ISBN 9780802862419.
