= List of manuscripts from Qumran Cave 8 =

List of the manuscripts from Qumran Cave 8
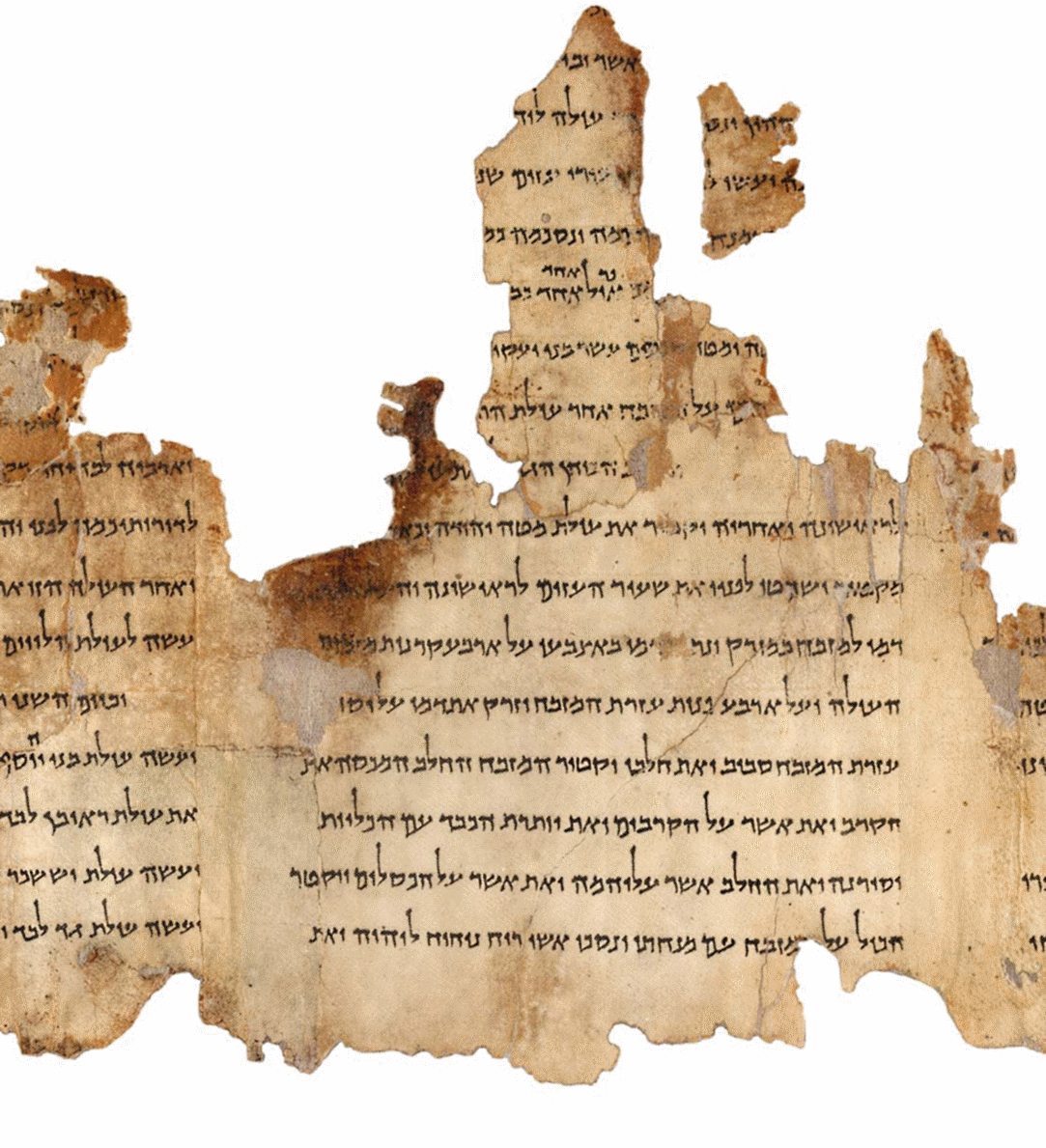
- A view of part of the Temple Scroll that was found in Qumran Cave 11.
- Material: Parchment, leather
- Writing: Hebrew
- Created: Est. 408 BCE to 318 CE
- Discovered: 1957
- Present location: Qumran

The following is a list of the Dead Sea Scrolls from the cave 8 near Qumran.

== Description ==
Wadi Qumran Cave 8, along with caves 7 and 9, was one of the only caves that are accessible by passing through the settlement at Qumran. Carved into the southern end of the Qumran plateau, cave 8 was excavated by archaeologists in 1957. Cave 8 produced five fragments: Genesis (8QGen), Psalms (8QPs), a tefillin fragment (8QPhyl), a mezuzah (8QMez), and a hymn (8QHymn). Cave 8 also produced several tefillin cases, a box of leather objects, a large number of lamps, jars, and the sole of a leather shoe.

== List of manuscripts ==
Some resources for more complete information on the Dead Sea Scrolls are the book by Emanuel Tov, "Revised Lists of the Texts from the Judaean Desert" for a complete list of all of the Dead Sea Scroll texts, as well as the online webpages for the Shrine of the Book and the Leon Levy Collection, both of which present photographs and images of the scrolls and fragments themselves for closer study. Information is not always comprehensive, as content for many scrolls has not yet been fully published.

Fragment or scroll identifier	Fragment or scroll name	Alternative identifier	English Bible Association	Language	Date/script	Description	Reference
Qumran Cave 8
8QGen	Genesis	8Q1	Genesis 17:12–13, 15, 18–19; 18:20–22, 24–25	Hebrew	Herodian		
8QPs	Psalms	8Q2	Psalm 17:5–9, 14; 18:5–12	Hebrew	Herodian		
8QPhyl	Phylacteries	8Q3	Exodus 13:1–16; 12:43–51; 20:11 Deuteronomy 6:4–5; 6:1–3; 10:20–22; 10:12–19; 5:1–14; 10:13; 11:2–3; 10:21–22; 11:1; 11:6–12	Hebrew	1–100 CE Herodian	Fragments from a "Phylactery"	
8QMez	Mezuzah	8Q4	Deuteronomy 10:1–11:21	Hebrew	30 BCE–68 CE Herodian		
8QHymn	Unidentified hymn	8Q5		Hebrew	Herodian	Non-biblical composition.	

== See also ==
- Biblical manuscripts
- Septuagint manuscripts
- List of Hebrew Bible manuscripts

== Sources ==
- Fitzmyer, Joseph A. (2008). A Guide to the Dead Sea Scrolls and Related Literature. Grand Rapids, MI: William B. Eerdmans Publishing Company. ISBN 9780802862419.
