= Angelic tongues =

Languages believed to be used by angels

Alfabet van Abraham, Henoch en Ezra (“Alphabet of Abraham, Enoch, and Ezra”) by Dutch Printmaker Jan Luyken, 1690

Angelic tongues are the languages believed by some religious traditions to be used by angels. It usually refers to sung praise in Second Temple period Jewish materials.

== Dead Sea Scrolls ==
Songs of the Sabbath Sacrifice is the principal source for angelic tongues at Qumran. The texts are fragmentary but appear to relate to praise tongues:

- [...] through the wonderful height [...] tongue of purity [...] gods (~yhla), seven [...] 4Q400 3 1, 1-2
- ...Psalm of praise, on the tongue of the fou[rth]...[Ps]alm of [tha]nksgiving, on the tongue of the fifth...[Psalm] of exultation, on the tongue of the sixth...Psalm of [singing, on the to]ngue of the seventh of the [chief] pri[nces,] a powerful song [to the God] of ho[lines] with its se[ven] wo[nd]er[ful songs] 4Q403 1 1, 1-6
- Proclaim his glory with the tongue of all who proclaim knowledge, his wonderful songs with the mouth of all who proclaim [him. For he is] God of all who sing {knowledge} for ever, and Judge in his power over all the spirits of understanding. 4Q4031 1 36-37
- ...The tongue of the first will be strengthened seven times with the tongue of the second to him....{this is repeated for the series up to the seventh}... 4Q403 1 2, 27-30

It is not clear whether the angelic tongues are coherent, intelligible to man. However, since Songs of the Sabbath Sacrifice is itself related to sung praise at the Qumran community, there is not a parallel with coherent angelic praise tongues in Testament of Job.

== Testament of Job ==
The pseudepigraphical Testament of Job (c. 100 BCE–100CE) contains a conclusion which is believed to relate to the compiling of the hymnbook used by a Therapeutae community. Job gives one of his daughters "a cord" (possibly a stringed instrument of some kind.)

- "And she took on another heart—no longer minded toward earthly things—but ecstatically in the angelic dialect, sending up a hymn to God in accord with the style of the angels. And as she spoke ecstatically, she allowed "The Spirit" to be on her garment." (Job 48:2-3)

Job's other daughters likewise took on "the dialect of archons", "the dialect of those and the "dialect of the cherubim" (Job 49:1-50:3). The "cherubim" are also mentioned Songs of the Sabbath Sacrifice as blessing God (4Q403 1 2, 15, cf. 4Q405 20 2, 3).

There is parallel description of sung prophecy among the Therapeutae in Alexandria by Philo, but no mention there of angelic tongues.

== New Testament ==
A possible reference to Jewish practices of angelic tongues is 1 Corinthians 13:1 "If I speak in the tongues of men and of angels, but have not love, I am a noisy gong or a clanging cymbal." The distinction "of men" and "of angels" may suggests that a distinction was known to the Corinthians. If a distinction is intended then 1 Corinthians 14:10 "There are doubtless many different languages in the world, and none is without meaning" may imply that "tongues of men" were intelligible, whereas 1 Corinthians 14:2 For one who speaks in a tongue speaks not to men but to God; for no one understands him, but he utters mysteries in the Spirit." refers to angelic tongues. The problem with this is that the "angelic" tongues documented at Qumran and among the Therapeutae appear to be inspired, but coherent and intelligible, sung praise. Against this is the view of Dunn that "It is evident then that Paul thinks of glossolalia as language".; but most likely, the text referring to angelic languages is hyperbole. The verse 2 of chapter 14 can also be applied if: someone speaks Ukrainian where everyone speaks English, and obviously no one would understand, other than God himself, who knows all languages.
