= 4Q122 =

Septuagint manuscript containing a fragment of Deuteronomy 11:4

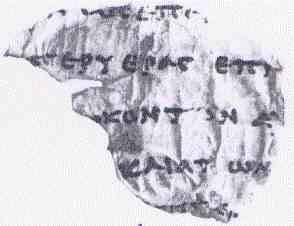
Septuagint Manuscript 4Q122 (4Q LXXDeut)

4Q122 (4Q LXXDeut; TM 62297; LDAB 3458, Rahlfs 819) – is a septuagint manuscript written on parchment (prepared from animal skin), dated from second century B.C.E.. The scroll contains a fragment of the biblical Book of Deuteronomy 11:4. It was found in a cave at Qumran in Cave 4. This fragment is also referred to as number 819 on the list of the Septuagint manuscripts according classification system by Alfred Rahlfs.

== Publication ==
The manuscript was published and described in 1992 by Patrick W. Skehan in his publication of Qumran cave 4.4 (Discoveries in the Judaean desert 9). Old designations roll indicates that it was found in Cave 4.

== Reconstruction of the text ==
The preserved text comes from Deuteronomy 11:4. It contains 27-28 characters per line.. The letters that are bolded have been reconstructed.

ς π
ἐρυθρᾶς ἐπὶ
κόντων α
καὶ ἀπώ

Reconstructed preserved part of the LXX Deut 11:4

αὐτῶν, ὡς ἐπέκλυσε τὸ ὕδωρ τῆς θαλάσσης
τῆς ἐρυθρᾶς ἐπὶ προσώπου αὐτῶν
καταδιωκόντων αὐτῶν ἐκ τῶν ὀπίσω
ὑμῶν καὶ ἀπώλεσεν αὐτοὺς Κύριος

Full verse LXX Deut 11:4:

καὶ ὅσα ἐποίησε τὴν δύναμιν τῶν Αἰγυπτίων, τὰ ἅρματα αὐτῶν καὶ τὴν ἵππον αὐτῶν, καὶ τὴν δύναμιν αὐτῶν, ὡς ἐπέκλυσε τὸ ὕδωρ τῆς θαλάσσης τῆς ἐρυθρᾶς ἐπὶ προσώπου αὐτῶν καταδιωκόντων αὐτῶν ἐκ τῶν ὀπίσω ὑμῶν καὶ ἀπώλεσεν αὐτοὺς Κύριος ἕως τῆς σήμερον ἡμέρας,

Romanized:

kai osa epoiēse tēn dynamin tōn Aigyptiōn, ta harmata autōn kai tēn hippon autōn, kai tēn dynamin autōn, hōs epeklyse to hydōr tēs thalassēs tēs erythras epi prosōpou autōn katadiōkontōn autōn ek tōn opisō hymōn kai apōlesen autous Kyrios heōs tēs sēmeron hēmeras,

NIV translation:

What he did to the Egyptian army, to its horses and chariots, how he overwhelmed them with the waters of the Red Sea as they were pursuing you, and how the Lord brought lasting ruin on them.

== Location ==
This manuscript is stored in the Rockefeller Museum in Jerusalem (Gr. 265 [4Q122]).

== Bibliography ==
- Patrick Skehan; Eugene Charles Ulrich; Peter J. Parsons (1992). Qumran cave 4.4 (Discoveries in the Judaean desert 9). pp. 195–197, no. 122.
