= Severus Scroll =

Lost Torah manuscript

The Severus Scroll (or Codex Severi) was a lost scroll containing the Torah. Very few sentences of it have been preserved by Rabbinic literature.

This scroll was allegedly taken to Rome by Emperor Titus as part of the booty after the Fall of Jerusalem, AD 70, and one century and a half later, Emperor Severus Alexander gave it as a gift to a synagogue he allowed to be built in Rome.

Variants of this scroll from the Masoretic Text are contained mainly in Genesis Rabbati, a midrash on the Book of Genesis usually ascribed to Moses ha-Darshan of Narbonne, in the first half of the 11th century; they are similar to the ones quoted in the second century CE by Rabbi Meir, who thus probably knew this Torah scroll.

The thirty-three quoted variants from the Masoretic Text are mostly minor differences due to variants in the omission or addition of words, plene and defective scriptum, and the weakening of gutturals. Some relevant variants are "garments of light" in place of "garments of skin" in (Genesis 3:21) and "he sold his ware" in place of "he sold his birthright" in (Genesis 25:33).
