= Qumran Physiognomies =

The Qumran Physiognomies was one of the Dead Sea Scrolls, a large collection of scrolls and fragments found near the Qumran community. The document labeled 4Q186, was known as "Astrological Physiognomies" or "Horoscopes".

== Astrological characteristics ==
Although 4Q186 is not a horoscope in the Greek sense, it has horoscopic characteristics. Vermes' translation of 4Q186 describes different parts of its subject "him" as in light and in darkness, which determines some characteristics of physiognomy, based on the astrology during an individual's birth (in this case relating to Taurus). This light and darkness could be explained by the location of Taurus above or below the horizon at the moment of birth.

== Parts ==
The zodiac nature of the horoscope can only be inferred through "in the foot of the bull" in the text and then applying zodiacal thought from other sources. This phrase can then be understood through possible Greek zodiacal sources, such as Teukros. This form of interpreting the text does not use the typical locations of the sun, moon and planets as in modern horoscopes. Rather, Qumran physiognomies utilizes the location, as mentioned before, of different "parts" of Taurus (see Teukros) on or above the horizon. Therefore, a man born with more parts of the zodiac sign above the horizon (or in the light), is good, and with more parts below the horizon (or in the darkness) is bad. The first subject of 4Q186 therefore, will be "meek" (in other words, good) because he has "six parts in the House of Light and three in the Pit of Darkness," while the second subject has "eight (parts) in the House of Darkness" and is therefore "very wicked." These predictions about their "good" or "bad"ness are therefore physiognomies.

== Sources ==
- Albani, Matthias (2000). The Encyclopedia of the Dead Sea Scrolls, "Horoscopes". Oxford: Oxford University Press.
- Vermes, Geza (2011). The complete Dead Sea scrolls in English (7 ed.). London: Penguin. ISBN 9780141197319.
