= 4Q41 =

Hebrew Bible manuscript from the first century BCE

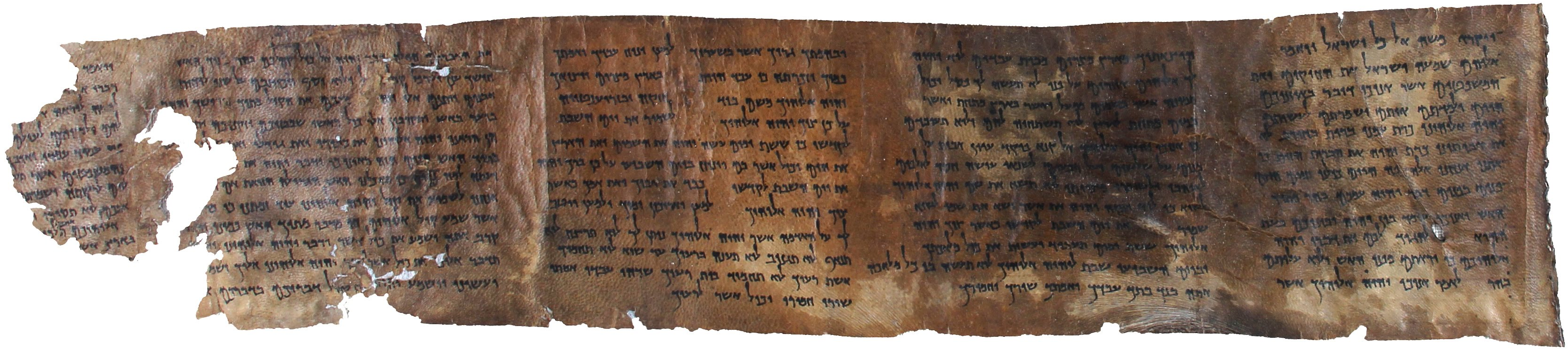
The second part of the All Souls Deuteronomy, containing the Decalogue

4Q41 or 4QDeuteronomy^{n} (often abbreviated 4QDeut^{n} or 4QDt^{n}), also known as the All Souls Deuteronomy, is a Hebrew Bible manuscript from the first century BC containing two passages from the Book of Deuteronomy. Discovered in 1952 in a cave at Qumran, near the Dead Sea, it preserves the oldest existing copy of the Ten Commandments.

== Discovery ==
The scroll was found in the fourth Qumran cave, which was discovered by Ta'amireh Bedouin in August 1952. It was later purchased for "several thousand dollars" on the black market by Frank Moore Cross and Roland de Vaux with money supplied by an anonymous member of the Unitarian Church of All Souls (Mr. Thayer Lindsley) in New York. This then gave rise to the name 'All Souls' Deuteronomy.

== Description ==
What is preserved of the scroll consists of two fragments that were originally sewn together. They were cut evenly at the bottom to a height of 7.1 cm and have a total length of about 45 cm. The first, containing one column of writing, was not the beginning of the scroll, as can be seen from the sewn edges on either side. The second sheet contains three complete and two damaged columns. The scroll was prepared with horizontal and vertical lines, as well as ink dots to mark the beginning of lines. The exceptionally well-preserved parchment used for 4Q41 is quite small compared to other Qumran scrolls.

== Date and script ==
The manuscript is dated on paleographic grounds to the early Herodian period, between 30 and 1 BC. Its script is unusually tiny and the letters waw and yod are almost indistinguishable, making some readings uncertain. The orthography employed by the scribe is much fuller than the Masoretic text and the Samaritan Pentateuch.

== Contents ==
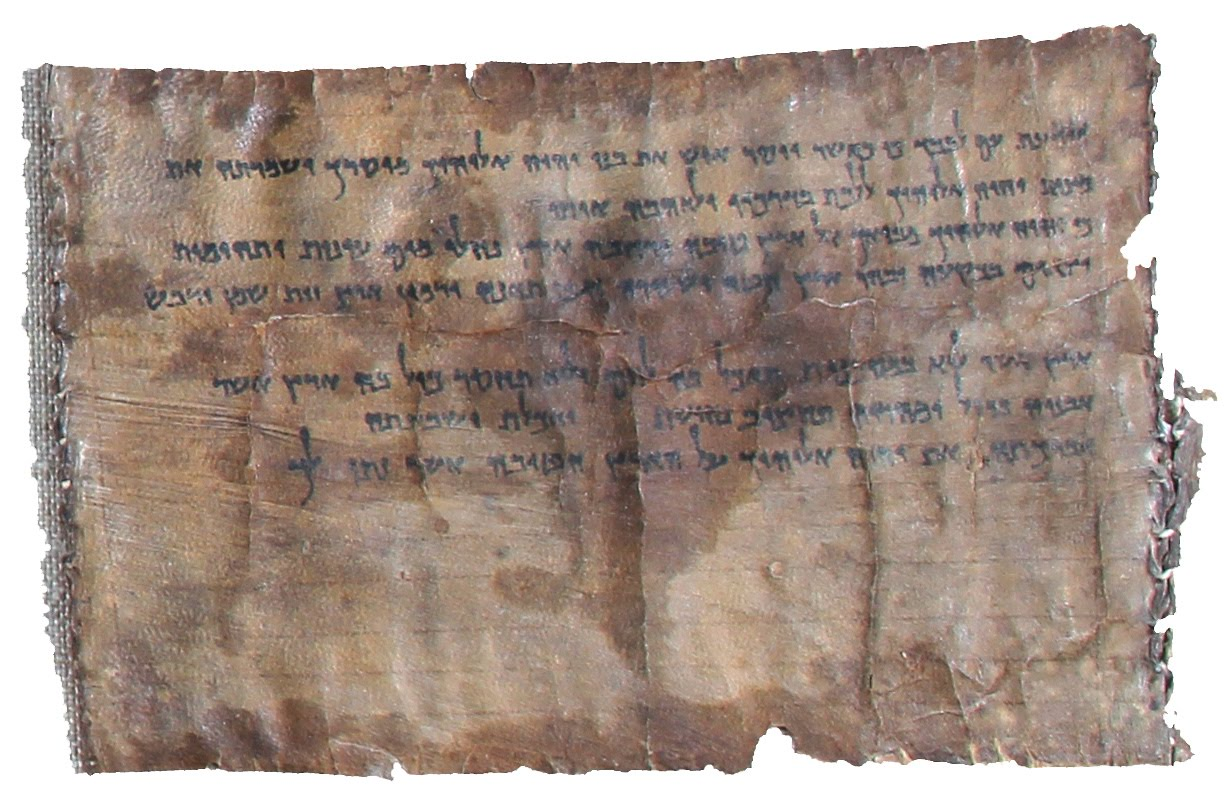
Deuteronomy 8:5–10 in 4Q41

The two sheets contain Deuteronomy 8:5–10 and Deuteronomy 5:1–6:1. Although the scroll was originally longer, the unusual ordering of the texts suggests it probably was not a regular biblical scroll, but contained only excerpts from Deuteronomy, possibly for liturgical or devotional purposes. Another explanation, suggested by Dead Sea Scrolls scholar John Strugnell, is that the scroll was repaired incorrectly.

The text of the decalogue generally follows Deuteronomy, but is in some places modified to bring it in harmony with the parallel version in Exodus. One significant variant, unique to this manuscript, is the addition of the reason for the institution of the sabbath, normally found only in the account in Exodus.

== Literature ==
- Tov, Emmanuel, Hebrew Bible, Greek Bible and Qumran: Collected Essays, Mohr Siebeck, 2008,
- White, Sidnie Ann, The All Souls Deuteronomy and the Decalogue in Journal of Biblical Literature, 109/2 (1990) 193-206
