= Barkhi Nafshi =

4Q Barkhi Nafshi (Hebrew "Bless Oh My Soul", not to be confused with Psalm 104) is a Second Temple period Jewish work found at Qumran. It can be generally described a collection of Hebrew language hymns giving thanksgiving for deliverance and other benefits received from God. Seely identifies the text as a late Hasmonean or early Herodian sectarian work. The hymns contain abstraction of the concept of deliverance from the evil thought, or yetzer ha ra, as in 4Q438 4a ii.6 where Tigechelaar has demonstrated an intertextual relationship between the Satan of Zechariah 3 and the "clothing" of the speaker of Barkhi Nafshi.

== Components ==
- 4Q434 Barkhi Nafshi a SL71 156 SL93/93a Weinfeld, Seely, DJD XXIX (1999), plates XVII–XIX
- 4Q435 Barkhi Nafshi b SL73 327 SL93a Weinfeld, Seely, DJD XXIX (1999), pl. XX
- 4Q436 Barkhi Nafshi c SL72 325 SL73a Weinfeld, Seely, DJD XXIX (1999), pl. XXI
- 4Q437 Barkhi Nafshi d SL74 325 516 SL73a Weinfeld, Seely, DJD XXIX (1999), pls. XXII–XXIII
- 4Q438 Barkhi Nafshi e SL87 259 SL87 Weinfeld, Seely, DJD XXIX (1999), pls. XXIII–XXIV
