= Qumran "Horoscopes" (4Q186) =

Horoscopes found with Dead Sea Scrolls

The Qumran Horoscopes are manuscripts found among the Dead Sea Scrolls; they are alternatively called "Astrological Physiognomies" (4Q186). Unlike most horoscopes, however, in 4Q186 no mention of the positions of astral bodies is found. Instead, the text uses the physiognomic features of a person to tell prophecy in the dabar. This blending of features- of horoscopes and of astrological physiognomies- makes it difficult to accurately title the fragments. For example, a man of "six parts" from the "house of light" and "three parts" from the "pit of darkness" is described (physiognomically) as "long and lean," and is expected (horoscopically) to "be meek."

The significance of 4Q186 to the Qumran community can possibly be illumined by the common Qumranite teachings concerning the two spirits of light and darkness, but this theory does not answer all questions. The presence of 4Q186 among the Qumran community should not, however, come as a surprise, "for if many Jews frowned on astrology, others... credited its invention to Abraham!"
