= 4Q126 =

- Rockefeller Museum
- Also known as: 4QUnidentified gr
- Type: Manuscript
- Date: 1st-century BCE (Hasmonean period)
- Language(s): Greek
- Material: Parchment
- Format: Scroll
- Condition: Too fragmented
- Script: Uncial, scripto continua
- Contents: Unidentified Texts
- Discovered: Cave No. 4 Nahal Hever

The 4Q126 (4QUnid gr) is an ancient Greek fragment and one of the Dead Sea Scrolls. The text of this manuscript is unknown and it has not been possible to identify it with any known LXX passage, a biblical verse or from some other literary work. Palaeographically it dates from the first century BCE or early first century CE.

== History ==
It was published in 1992 by Patrick W. Skehan, Eugene Ulrich and J. E. Sanderson in Discoveries in the Judean Desert IX, pp. 219-221. Currently the manuscript is housed in the Rockefeller Museum in Jerusalem.

== Description ==
According to Devorah Dimant, the manuscript is unbiblical, and "too fragmentary for any identification". Eugene Ulrich wrote that "it cannot be determined whether 4QUnid gr (4Q126) was part of the LXX". Emanuel Tov states: "The nature of this text is unclear".

=== The word κύριος ===
In one of the fragments the word κύριος appears, which is translated from the Koine Greek as lord.

Fragment 1

1 ]σ̣ποδ·[
2 ]·ν και κυ[
3 ]νων ασ ...[
4 ]φρο ...[

Romanization

1 ]spod·[
2 ]·n kai ky[
3 ]nōn as ...[
4 ]phro ...[

According to Meyer, in fragment 1, line 2 it reads κύ, and he affirm: "obviously, many [...] words could begin with κύ, and the identification of the other words is uncertain. This fragment, then does not offer substantive evidence for reconstructing κύριος".

Fragment 2

1 ]σαπο̣·ρ[
2 ]σ̣κορπιδ[
3 ]ηεμπ[
4 ]ν̣εμπαση[
5 ]ε̣ιτε κυριο[

Romanization

1 ]sapo·r[
2 ]skorpid[
3 ]ēemp[
4 ]nempasē[
5 ]eite kyrio[

Regarding an occurrence of the word κύριο in fragment 2, line 5, Anthony R. Meyer states:

The editors suggest that κύριο [...], if read as κύριος, "may indicate that the text is biblical or parabiblical." The preceding "ειτε" may be the coordinating conjunction ("or, either/or, even/if") or the second person plural present active imperative conjugation of a verb like υμνεω, as in the phrase υμνεωτε κύριος (e. g., Isa 12:4). Using database search programs, I have not found any convincing Greek biblical or Hellenistic parallels matching the wording of 4Q126. Overall, only two complete words from the 8 fragments of 4Q126 may be positively identified: και and τον. The context is unclear, but if kurios is identified in 4Q126 this would provide evidence for a Jewish use of this title in the first century BCE/CE. Even so, there is still no indication that κύριος refers to God.

== Sources ==
- Dimant, Devorah (2014). "Apocrypha and Pseudepigrapha at Qumran". History, Ideology and Bible Interpretation in the Dead Sea Scrolls: Collected Studies. Forschungen zum Alten Testament. Vol. 90. Mohr Siebeck. ISBN 9783161510212.
- Meyer, Anthony R. (2017). The Divine Name in Early Judaism: Use and Non-Use in Aramaic, Hebrew, and Greek (PDF). Ph.D. thesis, University of Cincinnati.
- Richey, M. (2012). "The Use of Greek at Qumran: Manuscript and Epigraphic Evidence for a Marginalized Language". Dead Sea Discoveries. 19 (2): 177–197. doi:10.1163/156851712X644640. JSTOR 41720831.
- Skehan, Patrick W.; Ulrich, Eugene; Sanderson, J. E. (1992). Discoveries in the Judean Desert. Vol. 9. pp. 223–242.
- Tov, Emanuel (2008). "Chapter Twenty-three: The Greek Biblical Texts from the Judean Desert". Hebrew Bible, Greek Bible and Qumran: Collected Essays. Texts and studies in ancient Judaism, ISSN 0721-8753. Vol. 121. Mohr Siebeck. p. 346. ISBN 9783161495465.
- Ulrich, Eugene (2015). The Dead Sea Scrolls and the Developmental Composition of the Bible. Vetus Testamentum, Supplements. Vol. 169. Leiden: Brill. doi:10.1163/9789004296039. ISBN 978-90-04-29603-9.
- "Unidentified 4Q126". The Leon Levy Dead Sea Scrolls Digital Library. Israel Antiquities Authority.
