= Dibrê Moshe =

Hebrew Dead Sea Scroll

Words of Moses
- דברי הימים
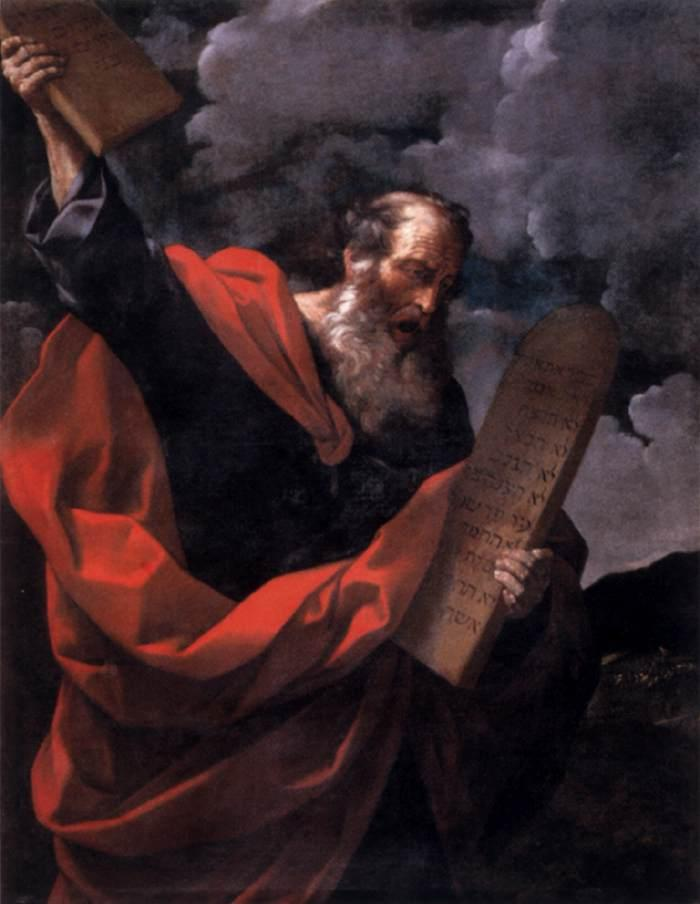
- Moses depicted with the 10 Commandments
- Material: Parchment
- Writing: Hebrew
- Period/culture: Hellenistic period
- Identification: 1QDM; 1Q22
- Scans of plate fragments

The Dibrê Moshe, also known as the Dires de Moïse or Words of Moses (identified as 1QDM = 1Q22), is a Hellenistic-Roman era manuscript fragment found among the Dead Sea Scrolls in Qumran Cave 1.

== Contents ==
=== Name ===
The Dibrê Moshe is not a name found within the book or a name from a contemporary source. The name was, at earliest, assigned during the 1950s following excavation, translation, and identification efforts.

=== Summary ===
Within the fragment, similar to a farewell discourse, God commands Moses to interpret the law for the Israelite community, and predicts that the people will fall away from his worship. Moses then tells his son Eliezer to speak the words of the law. Moses orders the people to choose for themselves who can interpret God's law for them, and then goes on to speak the law. He gives a warning to the people, stating that they should be careful in obeying God's law and keeping their given precepts.

The manuscript is influenced by the structure of Deuteronomy, which itself is a speech by Moses to the people of Israel. The text is seemingly a reworking of Moses's instructions to the Israelites prior to their entrance to Canaan. The total length of the writing is 4 columns.
