= 4Q119 =

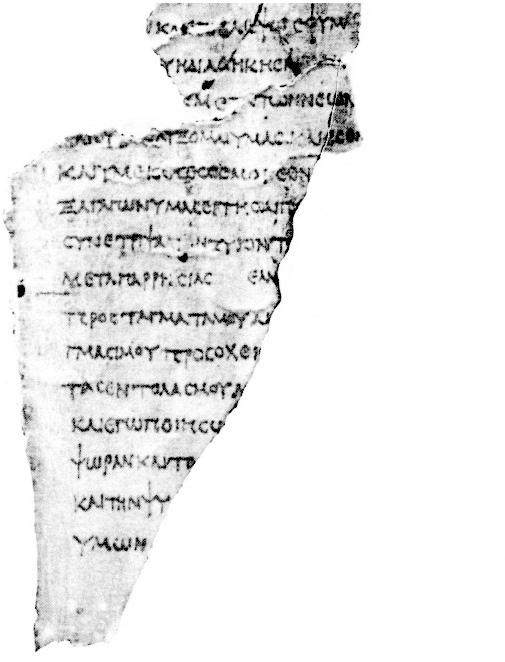
4Q119 (4QLXXLev^{a}) fragment 1 with text from Lev 26

4Q119 (also 4QLXXLev^{a}; TM 62293; LDAB 3454) designates the remnants of a Greek manuscript of the Book of Leviticus written on parchment. It was found at Qumran cave 4 and is dated to the 1st century BCE or 1st century CE. It got the no. 801 according to the system of Alfred Rahlfs. The manuscript is stored in Rockefeller Museum at Jerusalem (Mus. Inv. Gr. 1004).

== Bibliography ==
- Patrick Skehan, Eugene C. Ulrich, Judith E. Sanderson: 119. 4QLXXLeviticus^{a}. Qumran Cave 4.IV (Discoveries in the Judaean Desert 9). Clarendon Press, Oxford 1992. ISBN 0-19-826328-7, pp. 161–165, plate XXXVIII.
