= Songs of the Sabbath Sacrifice =

Songs found among the Dead Sea Scrolls

The Songs of the Sabbath Sacrifice, also referred to as the Angelic Liturgy, are a series of thirteen songs, one for each of the first thirteen Sabbaths of the year, contained in fragments found among the Dead Sea Scrolls. The Songs were found in 10 fragmentary copies: nine at Qumran (4Q400–407; 11Q17) and one at Masada. The dating is difficult to determine, but it is thought to have been written around 100 BCE.

Although nine copies were found at Qumran, the scroll is not generally believed to be a sectarian document. The common sectarian language normally found in the scrolls (such as references to laws applying to the Yahad) is not present in the songs. The fact that a copy of the songs was found at Masada suggests this was a widely circulated text and may imply the scrolls were used by other communities; which negates the likelihood of this text being composed at Qumran. Earlier theories proposed that the scrolls reached Masada through Qumran sectarians, but more recent DNA analyses of the parchment indicate that the Masada and Qumran copies indeed originated from different sources. The songs also use Elohim to refer to God, and the use of that word is extremely rare throughout the other scrolls thought to be sectarian in origin.

The Songs describe worship around the throne of God in the heavenly realms. Reference is made to angelic tongues. Throughout the thirteen songs there is everything ranging from accounts of how the angels lead their prayer service in the temple on high to detailed descriptions of the inner throne room where the presence of God and the other god-like beings reside. The scrolls can be categorized into three larger sections: 1–5, 6–8, 9–13. (Wise, Abegg, Cook 1994:350–76) The first section is badly fragmented, but seems to be centered on descriptions of the heavenly priests and their practices. The second section is concerned with the praises and blessings offered by the seven orders of angels, with the seventh song functioning as a peak of the series of thirteen. The final section offers descriptions of the heavenly temple, throne room, and throne (merkavah) of God.

The text seems to have been written with imagery from sources like Ezekiel, Isaiah, Exodus, and 1 Enoch (Schiffman 1994:351–60). The text invokes lofty imagery of angels, god-like beings, and intense descriptions of the heavenly throne. The entire text has the imagery of the biblical mystical books, with one significant difference: there is no narrative framework describing the vision being given to a prophet or mystic. Rather, the vision is presented directly, as if inviting those who are reciting the text to experience something similar. If these songs were used by an entire congregation, then the entire group would be chanting and singing these in unison, thus creating a mystical experience. It seems that these songs would have been used to create a sense of union with the angels and their heavenly worship on high.

== See also ==
- Jewish mysticism
  - Merkabah mysticism
  - Hekhalot literature
