= Book of Mysteries =

1st-century BCE Essene text

The Book of Mysteries (also known as the Book of Secrets) is an ancient Essene text found in fragmentary form among the Dead Sea Scrolls. The scroll fragments are given the alphanumeric designations of 1Q27 and 4Q299–301.

== Wisdom literature ==
The Book of Mysteries is closely related to another unnamed wisdom book found among the Dead Sea Scrolls, variously called The Secret of the Way Things Are or the Sapiential Work. In both texts, the term raz occurs frequently. Raz means "mystery" or "secret", and is defined as a type of wisdom or knowledge that is known by God and can only be known by humans by divine revelation. This word often occurs in the phrase raz nihyeh, which can be translated as "the secret of the way things are". The assumption behind The Book of Mysteries is that revelation, not reason, is the key to wisdom. The book is authored by an unnamed teacher who claims to be the recipient of such a revelation and is passing it along to his students.

== Origins ==
As with many of the Dead Sea Scrolls, the question of who wrote the scrolls and when has no definite answer. Dates as to when the manuscripts were copied can only be estimated. The copy of mystery text 1Q27 has been dated on paleographic grounds to the end of the first century BCE, so the book is at least that old. Lawrence Schiffman believes that the ideology, orthography and language of the texts show that it originates from the same circle as other sectarian works found among the Dead Sea Scrolls.

The tone of the writing reflects an elite group which believes that it alone holds the correct understanding of YHWH's plan for the universe and how to please him so as to be saved from the fate of the ignorant and hypocritical. Much of The Book of Mysteries appears to be a teaching of correction against those who do not live righteously in the author's eyes. They warn of the hypocrisy of nations, the false knowledge of magicians, and the wrath of God upon sinners. They especially warn against the fate of those who do not recognize the divine mysteries.

== Last days ==
The eschatology of the book is rather unusual. The end time described by the author does not manifest itself in the normal culmination of a battle, judgment or catastrophe, but rather as "a steady increase of light, [through which] darkness is made to disappear or in which iniquity dissolves and just as the smoke rising into the air eventually dissipates". In this sense, wisdom is an inevitable force that needs to be yielded to by those who choose to accept it and are capable of understanding it. There is no mention of angels, or YHWH's coming, or resurrection of the wise, or any of the typical messianic language that is usually associated with Jewish or Christian eschatological texts. It simply argues for a change in focus from folly to wisdom, and therefore righteousness.

== Bibliography ==
- Davies, Philip R. (2002). The Complete World of the Dead Sea Scrolls. London: Thames & Hudson. ISBN 978-0500283714.
- Harrington, Daniel (1996). Wisdom Texts from Qumran. The Literature of the Dead Sea Scrolls. London: Routledge. ISBN 978-0415139076.
- Harrington, Daniel J. (2000). "Mystery". In Lawrence H. Schiffman; James C. VanderKam (eds.). Encyclopedia of the Dead Sea scrolls. New York: Oxford University Press. ISBN 9780195084504.
- Larson, Erik W. (2000). "Mysteries". In Lawrence H. Schiffman; James C. VanderKam (eds.). Encyclopedia of the Dead Sea scrolls. New York: Oxford University Press. ISBN 9780195084504.
- Piper, Otto A. (1958). "The 'Book of Mysteries' (Qumran 1 27): A Study in Eschatology". Journal of Religion. 38 (2): 95–106. doi:10.1086/485048. S2CID 170080831.
- Wise, Michael O.; Abegg, Martin G.; Cook, Edward M. (25 October 2005). The Dead Sea Scrolls - Revised Edition: A New Translation. New York: Harper Collins. ISBN 978-0-06-076662-7.
