= Apocryphon =

Greek genre

Apocryphon ("secret writing"), plural apocrypha, was a Greek term for a genre of Jewish and Early Christian writings that were meant to impart "secret teachings" or gnosis (knowledge) that could not be publicly taught. Jesus is portrayed as having briefly withheld his messianic identity from the public and as giving private instruction to the apostles, and to figures in the canonical Gospels of the New Testament and secret teachings attributed to Jesus furnish the material of the "sayings" of the Gospel of Thomas and part of the material of the Gospel of Mary, which is purportedly a secret teaching supposedly committed to a trusted disciple by Jesus after his resurrection. The secret teaching in Gnostic literature refers to several things.

Examples include:

- Genesis Apocryphon, from the Qumran caves
- Secret Gospel of Mark (Apocryphon of Mark)
- Apocryphon of James (Secret Book of James), in the Nag Hammadi library
- Apocryphon of John (Secret Book of John), in the Nag Hammadi library
- Apocryphon of Ezekiel (Secret Book of Ezekiel)
- Apocryphon of the Ten Tribes

== See also ==
- Biblical apocrypha
- Jewish apocrypha
- New Testament apocrypha
- Nag Hammadi library
- List of Mandaic manuscripts
