= List of manuscripts from Qumran Cave 1 =

List of the manuscripts from Qumran Cave 1
- Photographic reproduction of the Great Isaiah Scroll, the best preserved of the biblical scrolls found at Qumran Cave 1.
- Material: Papyrus, Parchment, and Bronze
- Writing: Hebrew, Aramaic, Greek, and Nabataean
- Created: Est. 408 BCE to 318 CE
- Discovered: 1946
- Present location: Qumran

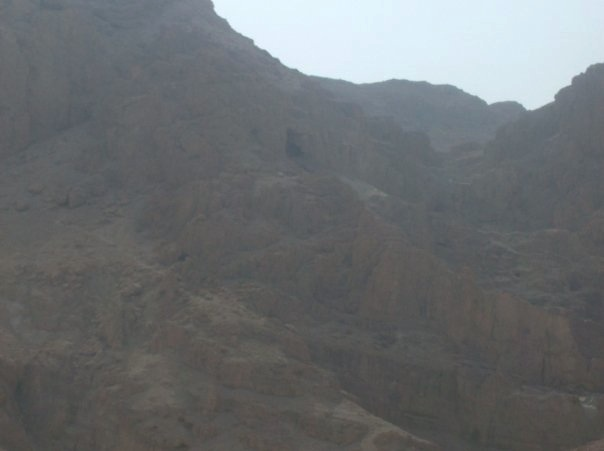
Qumran Cave 1, where 1QIsa^{a} was found. The entrance can be seen on the cliff face

The following is a list of the Dead Sea Scrolls from the cave 1 near Qumran.

== Description ==
Wadi Qumran Cave 1 was discovered for the first time in 1946. The initial discovery, by Bedouin shepherd Muhammed edh-Dhib, his cousin Jum'a Muhammed, and Khalil Musa, took place between November 1946 and February 1947. The shepherds discovered seven scrolls housed in jars in a cave near what is now known as the Qumran site and took them back to the camp to show to his family. None of the scrolls were destroyed in this process. The original seven Dead Sea Scrolls from Cave 1 at Qumran are the Great Isaiah Scroll (1QIsa^{a}), a second copy of Isaiah (1QIsa^{b}), the Community Rule Scroll (1QS), the Pesher on Habakkuk (1QpHab), the War Scroll (1QM), the Thanksgiving Hymns (1QH), and the Genesis Apocryphon (1QapGen). One of the pottery jars containing the scrolls from Cave 1 is now kept in the British Museum.

== List of manuscripts ==
Some resources for more complete information on the Dead Sea Scrolls are the book by Emanuel Tov, "Revised Lists of the Texts from the Judaean Desert" for a complete list of all of the Dead Sea Scroll texts, as well as the online webpages for the Shrine of the Book and the Leon Levy Collection, both of which present photographs and images of the scrolls and fragments themselves for closer study. Information is not always comprehensive, as content for many scrolls has not yet been fully published.

Fragment or scroll identifier	Fragment or scroll name	Alternative identifier	English Bible Association	Language	Date/script	Description	Reference
Qumran Cave 1
1QIsa^{a}	Great Isaiah Scroll		Isaiah 1:1–31; 2:1–22; 3:1–5:30; 6:1–13; 7:1–25; 8:1–23; 9:1–20; 10:1–34; 11:1–45:25; 46:1–66:24	Hebrew	356–103 BCE/150–100 BCE	Contains all 66 chapters with occasional lacunae and some missing words at the bottom of some columns	
1QIsa^{b}	Isaiah	cf. 1Q8	The Book of Isaiah	Hebrew	Hasmonean/Herodian	A second copy of portions of the Book of Isaiah	
1QS	Serekh ha-Yahad or "Community Rule"			Hebrew		cf. 4QS^{a-j} = 4Q255–64, 5Q11	
1QpHab	Pesher on Habakkuk		Habakkuk 1–2	Hebrew	Later half of the 1st century BC	Commentary on Habakkuk 1:2–17; 2:1–20	
1QM	Milhamah or War Scroll			Hebrew		cf. 4Q491, 4Q493; 11Q14?	
1QH^{a}	Hodayot or Thanksgiving Hymns			Hebrew		Some parts are also preserved in 1QH^{b} and 4QH^{a-f}	
1QapGen	Genesis Apocryphon		Genesis 12:18–15:4	Aramaic	25 BCE–50 CE		
CTLevi	Cairo Geniza or Testament of Levi			Aramaic			
1QGen	Genesis	1Q1	Genesis 1:18–21; 3:11–14; 22:13–15; 23:17–19; 24:22–24	Hebrew	Herodian		
1QExod	Exodus	1Q2	Exodus 16:12–16; 19:24–20:2, 20:5–6; 20:25–21:1; 21:4–5	Hebrew	Hellenistic-Roman		
1QpaleoLev	Leviticus – Numbers	1Q3	Leviticus 11:10–11; 19:30–34; 20:20–24; 21:24–22:6; 23:4–8 and Numbers 1:48–50	Hebrew	Hellenistic-Roman; Palaeo-Hebrew script		
1QDeut^{a}	Deuteronomy	1Q4	Deuteronomy 1:22–25; 4:47–49; 8:18–19; 9:27–28; 11:27–30; 13:1–6, 13–14; 14:21, 24–25; 16:4, 6–7	Hebrew	Hellenistic-Roman		
1QDeut^{b}	Deuteronomy	1Q5	Deuteronomy 1:9–13; 8:8–9; 9:10; 11:30–31; 15:14–15; 17:16; 21:8–9; 24:10–16; 25:13–18; 28:44–48; 29:9–20; 30:19–20; 31:1–10, 12–13; 32:17–29; 33:12–24	Hebrew	Hellenistic-Roman		
1QJudg	Judges	1Q6	Judges 6:20–22; 8:1(?); 9:2–6, 28–31, 40–43, 48–49	Hebrew	Hellenistic-Roman		
1QSam	Samuel	1Q7	2 Samuel 18:17–18; 20:6–10; 21:16–18; 23:9–12	Hebrew	Hellenistic-Roman		
1QIsa^{b}	Isaiah	Parts of 1QIsa^{b} as 1Q8	Isaiah 7:22–25; 8:1; 10:17–19; 12:3–6; 13:1–8, 16–19; 15:3–9; 16:1–2, 7–11; 19:7–17, 20–25; 20:1; 22:11–18, 24–25; 23:1–4; 24:18–23; 25:1–8; 26:1–5; 28:15–20; 29:1–8; 30:10–14, 21–26; 35:4–5; 37:8–12; 38:12–22; 39:1–8; 40:2–3; 41:3–23; 43:1–13, 23–27; 44:21–28; 45:1–13; 46:3–13; 47:1–14; 48:17–22; 49:1–15; 50:7–11; 51:1–10; 52:7–15; 53:1–12; 54:1–6; 55:2–13; 56:1–12; 57:1–4, 17–21; 58:1–14; 59:1–8, 20–21; 60:1–22; 61:1–2; 62:2–12; 63:1–19; 64:1, 6–8; 65:17–25; 66:1–24	Hebrew	Herodian		
1QEzek	Ezekiel	Parts of 1QIsa^{b} as 1Q9	Ezekiel 4:16–17; 5:1	Hebrew	Hellenistic-Roman		
1QPs^{a}	Psalms	1Q10	Psalm 86:5–8; 92:12–14; 94:16; 95:11–96:2; 119:31–34, 43–48, 77–79	Hebrew	Hellenistic-Roman		
1QPs^{b}	Psalms	1Q11	Psalm 126:6; 127:1–5; 128:3	Hebrew	Hellenistic-Roman		
1QPs^{c}	Psalms	1Q12	Psalm 44:3–5, 7, 9, 23–25	Hebrew	Herodian		
1QPhyl	Phylactery	1Q13	Deuteronomy 5:23–27; 11:8–11	Hebrew	Hellenistic-Roman	58 fragments from a Phylactery	
1QpMic	Pesher on Micah	1Q14		Hebrew	Herodian		
1QpZeph	Pesher on Zephaniah	1Q15		Hebrew	Hellenistic-Roman		
1QpPs	Pesher on Psalms	1Q16		Hebrew	Hellenistic-Roman		
1QJub^{a}	Jubilees	1Q17		Hebrew	Hellenistic-Roman	Jubilees	
1QJub^{b}	Jubilees	1Q18		Hebrew	Hasmonean	Jubilees	
1QNoah	Book of Noah	1Q19		Hebrew	Herodian	Parts of the lost Book of Noah	
1QapGen	Fragments of the "Genesis Apocryphon"	1Q20		Aramaic	Herodian		
1QTLevi / 1QALD	Testament of Levi	1Q21		Aramaic	Hasmonean	Aramaic Levi Document	
1QDM	"Dibrê Moshe" or "Words of Moses"	1Q22		Hebrew	Hellenistic-Roman		
1QEnGiants^{a}	Book of Giants	1Q23		Aramaic	Hasmonean	Enoch	
1QEnGiants^{b}	Book of Giants	1Q24		Aramaic	Hellenistic-Roman	Enoch	
1Q Apocr.Prophecy	"Apocryphal Prophecy"	1Q25		Hebrew	Herodian		
1Q Instruction	"Instruction"	1Q26		Hebrew	Hasmonean		
1QMyst	"The Book of Mysteries"	1Q27		Hebrew	Hellenistic-Roman		
1QS or 1QS^{a}	"Rule of the Congregation"	1Q28 (1Q28a)		Hebrew	Hasmonean	Fragment from "Community Rule"	
1QS^{b}	"Rule of the Blessing" or "Rule of the Benedictions"	1Q28b		Hebrew	Hasmonean	Fragment from "Community Rule"	
1QapocrMoses B	Apocryphon of Moses	1Q29		Hebrew	Hellenistic-Roman	"Liturgy of the Three Tongues of Fire"	
1Q Liturgical Text(?) A	"Liturgical Text 1"	1Q30		Hebrew	Hellenistic-Roman		
1Q Liturgical Text(?) B	"Liturgical Text 2"	1Q31		Hebrew	Hellenistic-Roman		
1QNJ(?)	"New Jerusalem"	1Q32		Aramaic	Herodian	cf. 11Q18	
1QM	Fragment of the 1QM or "War Scroll" or "Milhamah"	1Q33	Deuteronomy 20:2–5; Numbers 10:9, 24:17–19; Isaiah 31:8	Hebrew	30–1 BCE Early Herodian		
1QPrFetes / 1QLitPr	"Liturgical Prayers" or "Festival Prayers"	1Q34		Hebrew	Herodian		
1QH^{b}	"Hodayot" or "Thanksgiving Hymns"	1Q35		Hebrew	Herodian		
1Q Hymns	"Hymns"	1Q36		Hebrew	Hellenistic-Roman		
1Q Hymnic Composition(?)	"Hymnic Composition"	1Q37		Hebrew	Herodian		
1Q Hymnic Composition(?)	"Hymnic Composition"	1Q38		Hebrew	Hellenistic-Roman		
1Q Hymnic Composition(?)	"Hymnic Composition"	1Q39		Hebrew	Herodian		
1Q Hymnic Composition(?)	"Hymnic Composition"	1Q40		Hebrew	Hellenistic-Roman		
1Q41–70		1Q41–70		Hebrew		Unclassified Fragments	
1QDan^{a}	Daniel	1Q71	Daniel 1:10–17; 2:2–6	Hebrew	Hellenistic-Roman		
1QDan^{b}	Daniel	1Q72	Daniel 3:22–30	Aramaic	Hellenistic-Roman		

=== Gallery ===
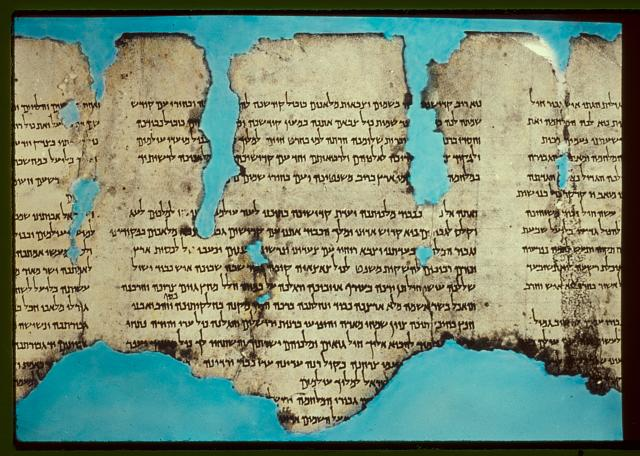
The War Scroll, found in Qumran Cave 1.

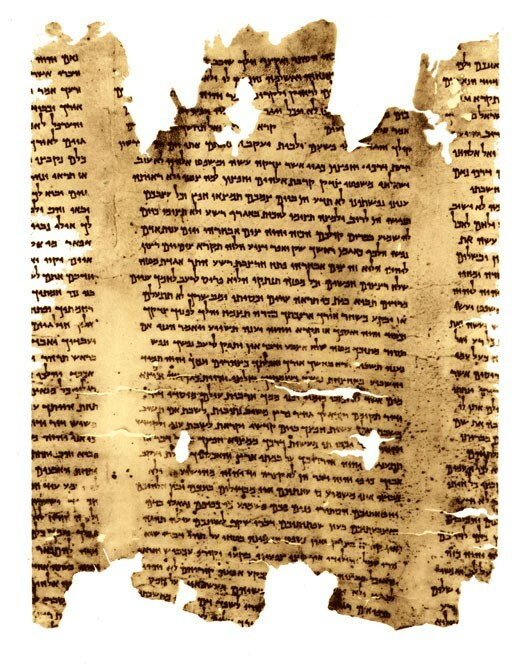
A portion of the second discovered copy of the Isaiah scroll, 1QIsa^{b}.

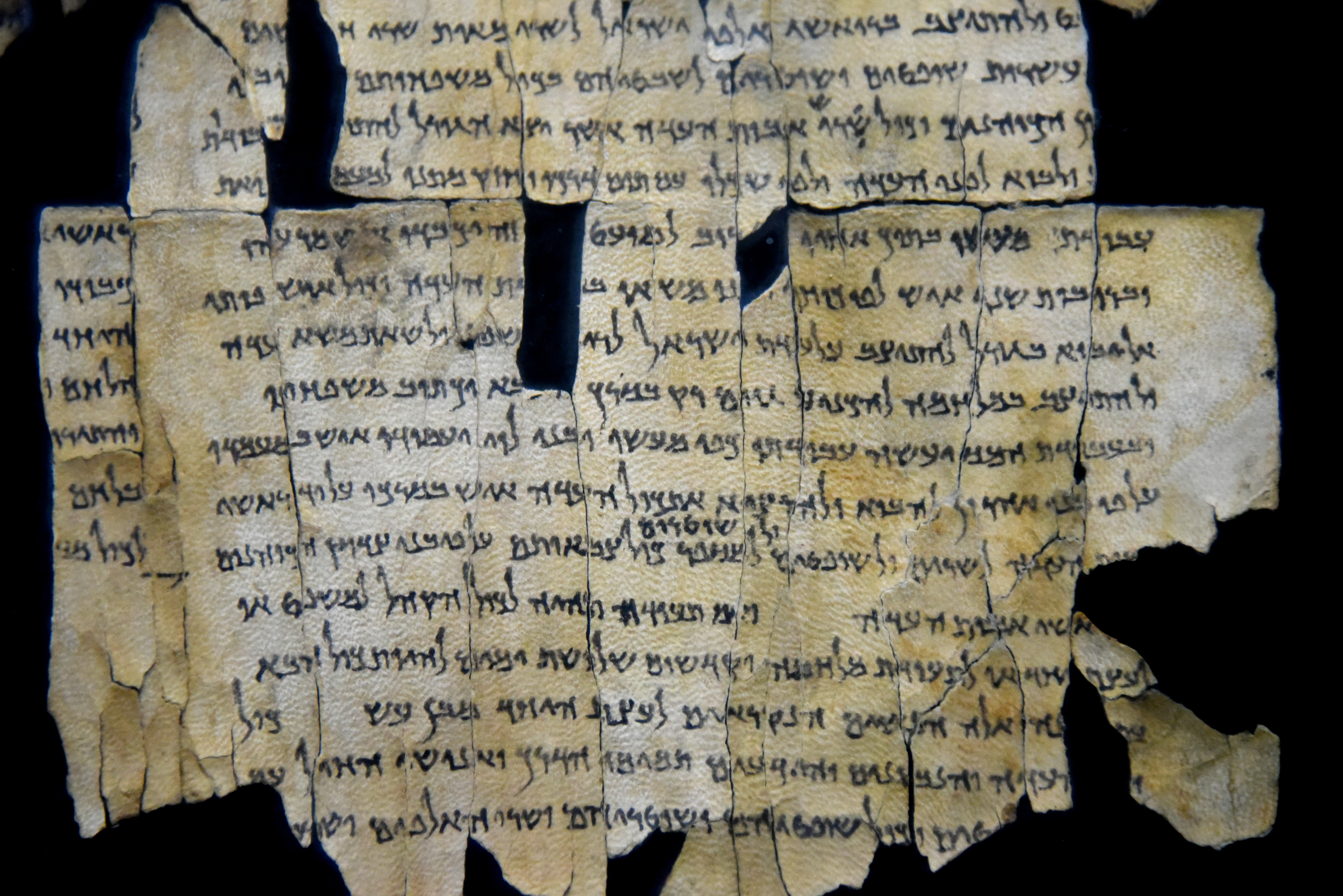
Part of Dead Sea Scroll 28a from Qumran Cave 1. The Jordan Museum, Amman

== See also ==
- Biblical manuscripts
- Septuagint manuscripts
- List of Hebrew Bible manuscripts

== Bibliography ==
- Fitzmyer, Joseph A. (2008). A Guide to the Dead Sea Scrolls and Related Literature. Grand Rapids, MI: William B. Eerdmans Publishing Company. ISBN 9780802862419.
