= Ancient Hebrew writings =

Overview of old literary works written in Hebrew

Ancient Hebrew writings are texts written in Biblical Hebrew using the Paleo-Hebrew alphabet before the destruction of the Second Temple during the Siege of Jerusalem (70 AD).

The earliest known precursor to Hebrew, an inscription in the Paleo-Hebrew alphabet, is the Khirbet Qeiyafa ostracon (11th–10th century BC), if it can be considered Hebrew at that early a stage.

By far the most varied, extensive, and historically significant body of literature written in Biblical Hebrew is the Hebrew Bible, but other works have survived as well. Before the Imperial Aramaic-derived Hebrew alphabet was adopted circa the 5th century BC, the Phoenicia-derived Paleo-Hebrew alphabet was used for writing. A derivative of the script still survives as the Samaritan script.

== Origins, dialects and classification ==
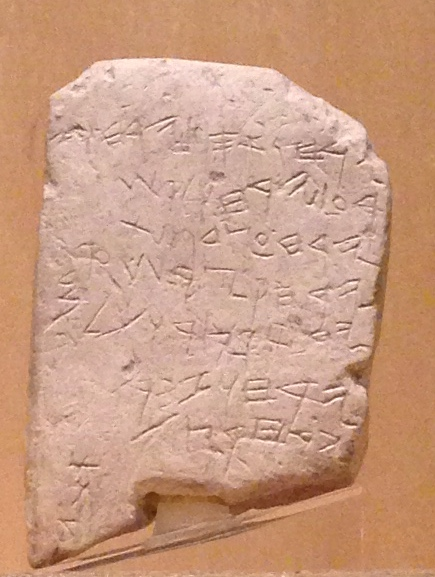
The Gezer calendar (c. 925 BC). Scholars are divided as to whether the script and language are Phoenician or paleo-Hebrew.

Hebrew is one of the Canaanite languages. The language variety in which the Masoretic Text is written is known as "Biblical" or "Classical Hebrew" (c. 10th century BC – 1st century). Varieties of Hebrew were spoken not only by the ancient Israelites but also in adjacent kingdoms east and south of the Jordan River, where distinct non-Israelite dialects existed, now extinct: Ammonite, Moabite, and Edomite. After the inhabitants of the Kingdom of Israel (Samaria) had been deported in the Assyrian captivity approximately 721 BC, an equivalent linguistic shift occurred. In the Second Temple period, which began after the Babylonian captivity in the 5th century BC, the two known remnants of the Twelve Tribes of Israel came to be referred to as Jews and Samaritans (see Samaritan Hebrew).

Genealogical classification of Hebrew:

- Proto-Afroasiatic language
  - Proto-Semitic language
    - Central Semitic languages
      - Northwest Semitic languages
        - Canaanite
          - Classical Hebrew

Unlike Samaritan and Biblical Hebrew, the other varieties are poorly studied due to a lack of sufficient data. It may be argued that they are independent languages, as the distinction between language and dialect is ambiguous. They are known only from very small corpora, coming from seals, ostraca, transliterations of names in foreign texts.

Hebrew and Phoenician are Canaanite languages, which, along with Aramaic constitute the Northwest Semitic languages. Extra-biblical Canaanite inscriptions are gathered along with Aramaic inscriptions in editions of the book "Kanaanäische und Aramäische Inschriften", from which they may be referenced as KAI n (for a number n); for example, the Mesha Stele is "KAI 181".

== The Hebrew Bible ==
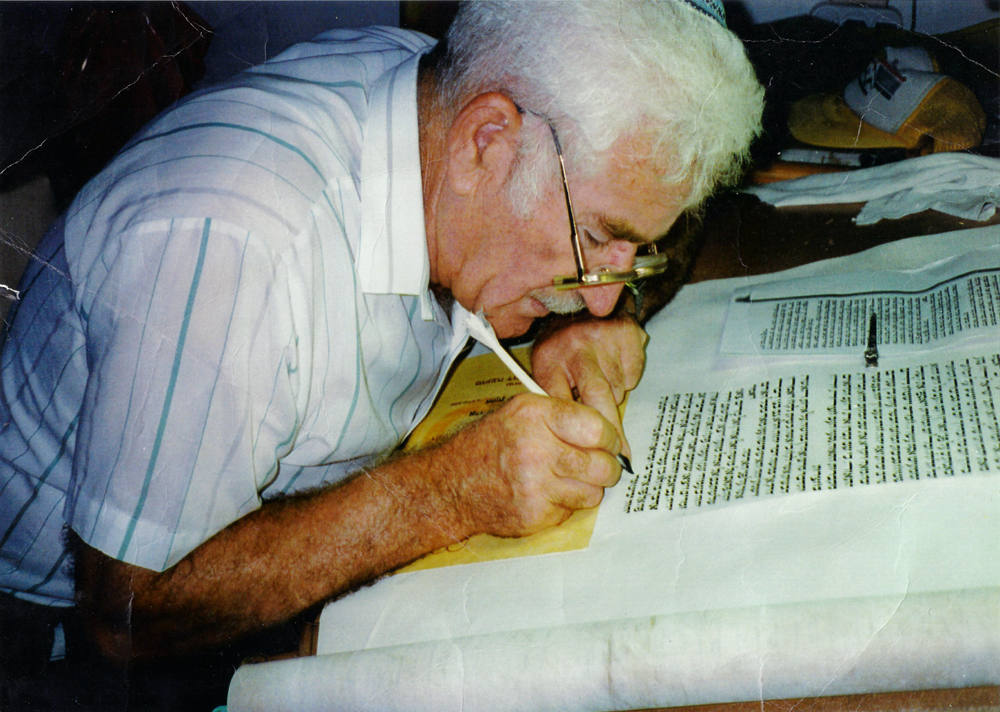
A sofer stam writing a Sefer Torah.

The Hebrew Bible is commonly known in Judaism as the "Tanakh", it being a vocalization of the acronym TNK (תַּנַ"ךְ): Torah ("Teachings"), Nevi'im ("Prophets") and Ketuvim ("Writings"). In Christianity it's known as the "Old Testament". The Bible is not a single, monolithic piece of literature because each of these three sections, in turn, contains books written at different times by different authors. All books of the Bible are not strictly religious in nature; for example, The Song of Songs is a love poem and, along with The Book of Esther, does not explicitly mention God.

"Torah" in this instance refers to the Pentateuch (to parallel Chumash, חומש), so called because it consists of five books: Genesis, Exodus, Numbers, Leviticus and Deuteronomy. It is the core scripture of Judaism and Samaritanism, honored in these religions as the most sacred of scripture. It is sometimes called the "Five Books of Moses" because according to the Jewish tradition, the Torah, as a divinely inspired text, was given to Moses by God himself on Mount Sinai during the Exodus of the Israelites from Egypt, which is portrayed as the founding event in the formation of the Israelite religion. Other than discussing the Exodus itself and the journey to the Promised Land, the Pentateuch has such themes as the origin of the world, of humanity and of the ancient Israelites, the ancestors of modern-day Jews.

The Nevi'im section of the Hebrew Bible consists of two sub-divisions: the Former Prophets (Nevi'im Rishonim נביאים ראשונים, the narrative books of Joshua, Judges, Samuel and Kings) and the Latter Prophets (Nevi'im Aharonim נביאים אחרונים, the books of Isaiah, Jeremiah and Ezekiel and the Twelve Minor Prophets). The first sub-division speaks much about the history of the Israelites following the death of Moses, arrival to the Promised Land and the history of the kingdom up until the Siege of Jerusalem by the Neo-Babylon Empire in 586 BCE.

The Ketuvim sector of the Hebrew Bible is a collection of philosophical and artistic literature believed to have been written under the influence of Ruach ha-Kodesh (the Holy Spirit). It consists of 11 books: Daniel, Ezra-Nehemiah, Chronicles, five books known as the Chamesh Megilot and three poetic books, including the Book of Psalms, quotations of which comprise a large portion of canonical daily prayers in Judaism.

=== Dating and authorship ===
The oldest manuscripts discovered yet, including those of the Dead Sea Scrolls, date to about the 2nd century BCE. While Jewish tradition holds that the Pentateuch was written between the 16th century and the 12th century BCE, secular scholars are virtually unanimous in rejecting these early datings, and agree that there was a final redaction some time between 900–450 BCE. The traditional view is that all five books were written in immediate succession, but some scholars believe that Deuteronomy was written later than the other four books.

The traditional Jewish view regarding the authorship of the Pentateuch is that it was written by Moses under God's order, except for the last eight verses of Deuteronomy which describe the death of Moses and were written by Joshua, Moses's student who became a prophet. In secular scholarly circles by the end of the 19th century, a popular proposition regarding the authorship was the documentary hypothesis, which has remained quite influential to this day, despite criticism. The books of the prophets are entitled in accordance with the alleged authorship. Some books in the Ketuvim are attributed to important historical figures (e.g., the Proverbs to King Solomon, many of the Psalms to King David), but it is generally agreed that verification of such authorship claims is extremely difficult if not impossible, and many believe some or even all of the attributions in the canon and the apocrypha to be pseudepigraphal.

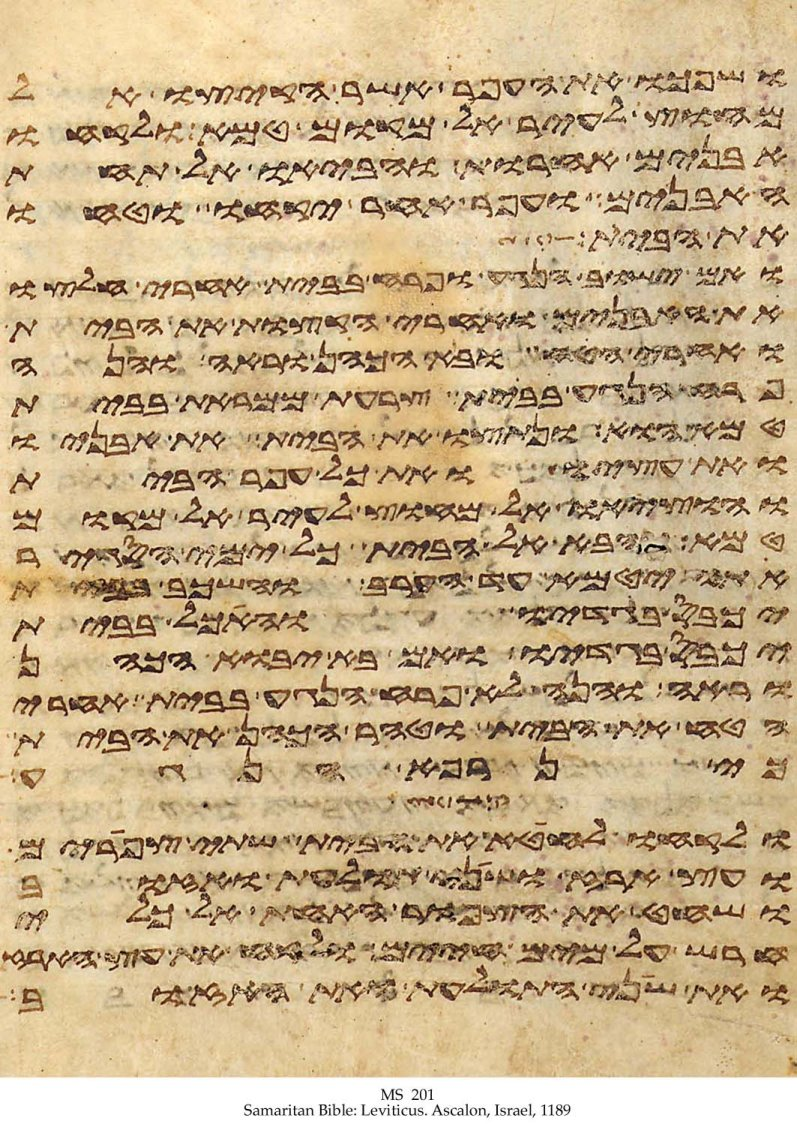
A page from the Samaritan version of Leviticus, written in the Samaritan script.

Scholars believe that the Song of the Sea (Exodus 15) was compiled and passed orally before it was quoted in the Book of Exodus and that it is among the most ancient poems in the history of literature, perhaps going back to the 2nd millennium BCE. The Song of Moses (Deuteronomy 32:1–43) and the Song of Deborah (Judges 5) were written in Archaic Biblical Hebrew, also called Old Hebrew or Paleo-Hebrew (10th–6th centuries BCE, corresponding to the monarchic period until the Babylonian Exile).

=== Samaritan version of the Torah ===
The only descendants of the Israelites who have preserved Hebrew texts are the Jews and the Samaritans and, of the latter, there are but a few hundred left. Both the Samaritan religion and the indigenous Samaritan language, which today is used only liturgically, differ somewhat from their Jewish counterparts, though the difference between the language varieties is only dialectal. The canon of the Samaritans consists solely of a version of the Pentateuch. It is slightly different from the Jewish Masoretic Text version. Most are minor variations in the spelling of words or grammatical constructions, but others involve significant semantic changes, such as the uniquely Samaritan commandment to construct an altar on Mount Gerizim. It is to this day written in a script which developed from the paleo-Hebrew script (namely the Samaritan script), whereas the common "Hebrew script" is in fact a stylized version of the Aramaic script, not of the paleo-Hebrew script.

== Early rabbinic literature ==
Post-Biblical Hebrew writings include rabbinic works of Midrash, Mishnah, and Talmud. In addition, there are non-rabbinic Hebrew texts from the Second Temple and subsequent periods.

The subject of the Talmud is the Torah-derived Halakhah, Jewish religious law, which at the time of its writing was indistinguishable from secular law, as indeed the dichotomy had not yet arisen in Levantine society. The Talmud has two components to it: the Mishnah, which is the main text, redacted between 180 and 220 CE, and the Gemarah, the canonized commentary to the Mishnah. Very roughly, there are two traditions of Mishnah text: one found in manuscripts and printed editions of the Mishnah on its own, or as part of the Jerusalem Talmud (Talmud Yerushalmi), the other is found in manuscripts and editions of the Babylonian Talmud (Talmud Bavli). Unless otherwise specified, the word "Talmud" on its own is normally understood to mean the Babylonian Talmud.

The Jerusalem Talmud was compiled in the 4th century CE in Galilee, and the Babylonian Talmud was compiled about the year 500 CE, although it continued to be edited later. While the Pentateuch is sometimes called the "Written Torah", the Mishnah is contrasted as the "Oral Torah" because it was passed down orally between generations until its contents were finally committed to writing following the destruction of the Second Temple in 70 CE, when Jewish civilization was faced with an existential threat.

Descent from the Talmudic tradition is the defining feature of Rabbinic Judaism. In Rabbinic Judaism it is believed that the oral traditions codified in the Oral Torah were co-given with the Written Torah to Moses on Mount Sinai. This belief has, in contrast, been rejected by the Sadducees and Hellenistic Jews during the Second Temple period, the Karaites and Sabbateans during the early and later medieval period, and in the modern non-Orthodox denominations: Reform Judaism sees all scripture as derived from human experience of the divine, Conservative Judaism holds that at the very least some of the oral law is man-made, and Reconstructionist Judaism denies the very idea of revelation. The vast majority of Jews today come from a Rabbinic Jewish background. Karaite Judaism is considered the main contrast to Rabbinic Judaism in our days, but even though Karaites constituted close to half of the global Jewish population around the early 2nd millennium CE, today there but a few tens of thousands left.

=== The language and style of the Talmud ===
Of the two main components of the Babylonian Talmud, the Mishnah is written in Mishnaic Hebrew. Within the Gemara, the quotations from the Mishnah and the Baraitas and verses of Tanakh quoted and embedded in the Gemara are in Hebrew. The rest of the Gemara, including the discussions of the Amoraim and the overall framework, is in a characteristic dialect of Jewish Babylonian Aramaic. There are occasional quotations from older works in other dialects of Aramaic, such as Megillat Taanit. Overall, Hebrew constitutes somewhat less than half of the text of the Talmud.

This difference in language is due to the long time period elapsing between the two compilations. During the period of the Tannaim (rabbis cited in the Mishnah), the spoken vernacular of Jews in Judaea was a late form of Hebrew known as Rabbinic or Mishnaic Hebrew, whereas during the period of the Amoraim (rabbis cited in the Gemara), which began around 200 CE, the spoken vernacular was Aramaic. Hebrew continued to be used for the writing of religious texts, poetry, and so forth.

There are significant differences between the two Talmud compilations. The language of the Jerusalem Talmud is a Western Aramaic dialect, which differs from the form of Aramaic in the Babylonian Talmud. The Jerusalem Talmud is often fragmentary and difficult to read, even for experienced Talmudists. The redaction of the Babylonian Talmud, on the other hand, is more careful and precise. The law as laid down in the two compilations is basically similar, except in emphasis and in minor details. The Jerusalem Talmud has not received much attention from commentators, and such traditional commentaries as exist are mostly concerned with comparing its teachings to those of the Babylonian Talmud.

== Miscellaneous extracanonical literature ==
Religious texts whose authenticity is not officially recognized are termed apocryphal. Many texts have been lost. No Sadducee texts are extant.

The Septuagint included 14 books accepted by some Christians but excluded from the 24-book Hebrew Bible canon (i.e., Tanakh), not all of them written originally in Hebrew. The Greeks use the word Anagignoskomena (Ἀναγιγνωσκόμενα "readable, worthy to be read") to describe these books. The Eastern Orthodox Churches have traditionally included all of them in their Old Testaments. Most of them, the ones named Deuterocanonical, are considered canonical also by the Roman Catholic Church.

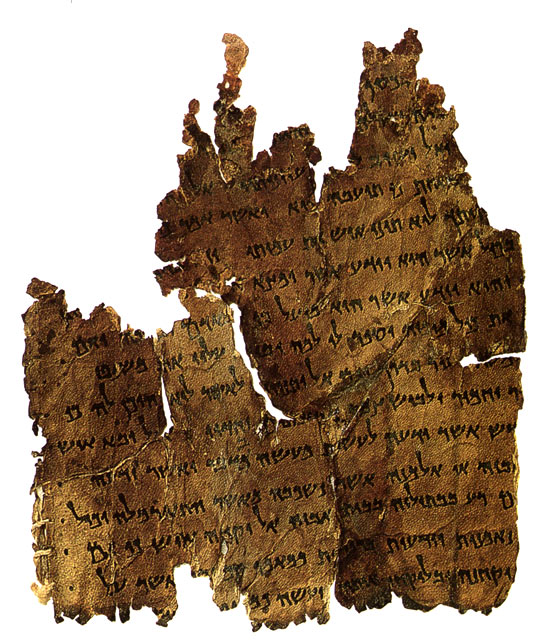
The Qumran Caves Scrolls are a collection of some 981 different texts—apocrypha and various extra-biblical works, but also copies of texts from the Hebrew Bible and the second oldest known surviving manuscripts of works later included in the biblical canon.

A significant number of apocryphal works was written in the Second Temple Period (530 BCE – 70 CE); see also Second Temple Judaism. Some examples:

- The Book of Jubilees, an alternative narration of Genesis and Exodus
- The Book of Enoch
- The Book of Tobit
- The Wisdom of Sirach
- Psalms 152–155

The discovery of the Qumran Caves Scrolls (3rd century BCE – 1st century CE), unveiled previously unknown documents that shed light on the rules and beliefs of a particular group or groups within greater Judaism. The Qumran Caves Scrolls encompass most of the Dead Sea Scrolls. They are associated with the Essenes. Notable examples:

- The Community Rule
- The War Scroll
- The Habakkuk Commentary
- The Rule of the Blessing

Sefer Yetzirah is arguably the earliest extant book on Jewish esotericism, although some early commentators treated it as a treatise on mathematical and linguistic theory as opposed to Kabbalah. In traditional lore, the book is ascribed to the Bronze Age patriarch Abraham. Some critical scholars argue for the 2nd century BCE as an early date of its writing, or the 2nd century CE, or even later origins.

Hekhalot literature is a genre of Jewish esoteric and revelatory texts produced some time between Late Antiquity – some believe from Talmudic times or earlier – to the Early Middle Ages.

Many non-canonical books are referenced in the Bible. Most of them have been lost.

== See also ==
- Hebrew and Aramaic papyri
