= War Rule =

War Rule may refer to:

- The War of the Sons of Light Against the Sons of Darkness, a Dead Sea Scroll text and a military organization and strategy manual
- The War of the Messiah, a Dead Sea Scroll text found in manuscripts 4Q285 and 11Q14
