= Genesis Apocryphon =

One of the original seven Dead Sea Scrolls

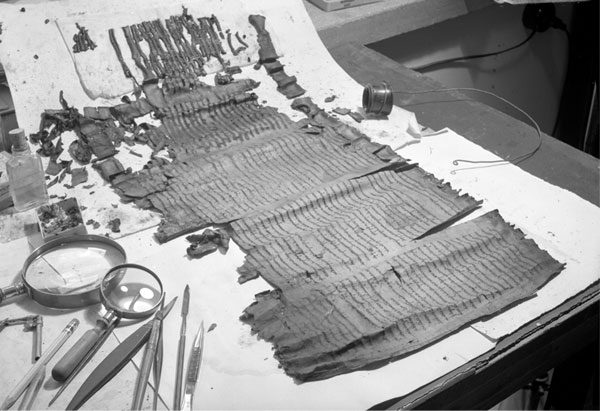
Genesis Apocryphon

The Genesis Apocryphon (1Q20), also called the Tales of the Patriarchs or the Apocalypse of Lamech and labeled 1QapGen, is one of the original seven Dead Sea Scrolls discovered in 1946 by Bedouin shepherds in Cave 1 near Qumran, a small settlement in the northwest corner of the Dead Sea. Composed in Aramaic, it consists of four sheets of leather. Furthermore, it is the least well-preserved document of the original seven. The document records a conversation between the biblical figure Lamech, son of Methuselah, and his son, Noah, as well as first and third person narratives associated with Abraham. It is one of the nonbiblical texts found at Qumran. A range of compositional dates for the work have been suggested from the 3rd century BC to 1st century AD. Palaeography and Carbon-14 dating were used to identify the age of the documents. It is 13 inches in length and 2.75 inches in width at its widest point in the middle.

== Discovery and state of the document ==
The Genesis Apocryphon was one of the seven major scrolls found at Qumran in Cave 1. It is one of the collection in the Dead Sea Scrolls, which has over 800 documents in fragmentary form. All documents have been found in various states of preservation in twelve caves of the cliffs that parallel the northwest shore of the Dead Sea and in the general location of Qumran. The scroll was found in the Spring of 1947 by Bedouin shepherds, after throwing a rock into a cave while looking for their lost sheep.

Along with the Isaiah Scroll, the commentary on Habakkuk, and the Manual of Discipline, this document was sold by the Bedouin who discovered it to Mar Athanasius Yeshue Samuel, the superior at the Monastery of Saint Mark the Evangelist and the Virgin Mary of Jerusalem. The four scrolls were transferred from Jerusalem to Syria and to Lebanon under certain political conditions in the area. There were plans made to transfer the scrolls to the U.S. but permission was later retracted because it was insisted that a high price could be asked for the scrolls if they remained unrolled and unraveled. The four scrolls were then announced for sale in the Wall Street Journal for $250,000 and were purchased by Israel on February 13, 1955. The Genesis Apocryphon joined the Isaiah Scrolls, War Scroll and the Thanksgiving Psalms, which had been purchased from Bedouins by Eleazar Sukenik of the Hebrew University of Jerusalem. The seven main scrolls found in Cave 1 at Qumran, came to be housed in the Shrine of the Book in West Jerusalem.

J. Biberkraut was called upon to conduct the unrolling of the Genesis Apocryphon. When it was opened, it was found to lack the beginning and the end of the text. What is called Column 1, the inner most end of the scroll shows traces and signs that another piece of skin had originally been there. Moreover, the last line on Column 22 ends in the middle of a sentence, showing that there is text missing. At certain points, the scroll also displays holes where ink has corroded through the document, creating missing areas within the scroll.

In 1968, The Jerusalem Post reported that a change in the humidity of the Shrine of the Book had affected the condition of the Genesis Apocryphon. The change was allegedly caused by the opening of a wall during construction and renovations. This resulted in the wrinkling of the parchment on some of the Dead Sea Scrolls documents, and the document most affected was the Genesis Apocryphon.

== Genre ==
=== Parabiblical writings ===
The literary genre of the Genesis Apocryphon lies within the "rewritten bible" category, which can be closely compared to the Targum, Midrash, and parabiblical or parascriptural genres. The term "parascriptural" can be used as an umbrella term for a broad class of texts that in various ways extend the authority of scripture by imitation and interpretation. The "rewritten bible" category is the result of extending scripture which was a somewhat common practice during the Second Temple period. Writers employed several different methods of rewriting scripture: rearranging passages, adding detail, and clarifying points that were open to misinterpretation.

The Genesis Apocryphon is heavily influenced by the Book of Enoch, and the Book of Genesis account. It records the story of Genesis in the same chronological order, but by using these editing methods, it presents the patriarchs as examples to emulate. The main process is effectively substitution, or replacing the text of Genesis with new narrative, but the Genesis Apocryphon also adds more detail to the story of the patriarchs and their ancestry. Most prominently, the approach extends scripture by means of supplementation, incorporating traditions from other Enochic writings, into the story of Genesis. For example, the Genesis Apocryphon seeks to justify Abram's poor treatment of Sarai in Egypt (Genesis 12) by adding that Abram had a prophetic dream from God that sanctions his actions towards his wife.

The new narrative contained in the Genesis Apocryphon is not intended to be a new edition of Genesis, but the work is remarkable for its creative and imaginative freedom. Typologically, the Genesis Apocryphon represents a flexible attitude to the scriptural text and the desire to provide deeper insight into the lives of the patriarchs.

== Contents ==
The Genesis Apocryphon is a retelling of the stories of the patriarchs. It can be separated into books: the Book of Lamech, the Book of Noah, and the Book of Abraham.

=== Genesis Apocryphon and the Enochic tradition ===
Genesis Apocryphon reflects the influence of the Enochic tradition, although the direction of dependence for each specific Enochian book and passage are being debated.

Genesis Apocryphon is largely based upon Genesis and 1 Enoch. But in regards to the Book of Jubilees, the dependence is not clear. Several scholars, such as Daniel Machiela, argue that the Genesis Apocryphon and the Book of Jubilees both depend on a common source rather than one directly borrowing from the other.

For example, good evidence for a common source is found in the "Table of Nations" (the division of the earth among Noah's sons). Both texts include specific geographic details and toponyms not found in Genesis, but well attested in ancient Hellenistic cartography. Thus, scholars suggest that both authors independently adapted an existing world map.

Also, both texts contain similar traditions regarding Noah that are absent from the Bible, such as his birth narrative and specific sacrificial laws. Some researchers believe these details were drawn from a now-lost Book of Noah, fragments of which have also been identified in the Book of Enoch, and other texts of the Enochic tradition.

Although most of the texts from Qumran relevant to the Genesis Apocryphon are in Aramaic, there are also some Hebrew fragments that are relevant. In particular, the Hebrew scroll 1Q19 (also sometimes known as 'The Book of Noah') from Cave 1 is related both to 1 Enoch, and to Genesis Apocryphon. Ariel Feldman (2009) considers carefully the relationship between 1Q19 and 1 Enoch, but also notes the connection of both texts to the Genesis Apocryphon. Feldman points out that the fragments relating the story of Noah's birth are quite small and difficult to interpret in both the Apocryphon and 1Q19. Yet 1QapGen II-V fragments do provide some clear parallels to 1Q19 fragments, such as in some details relevant to Lamech. Thus, similarly to how he also views 1 Enoch, Feldman suggests a common prior Enochic tradition behind both the Apocryphon and 1Q19.

=== Biblical material ===
Most of the stories in Genesis Apocryphon are told in first person, written in Hasmonaean Aramaic, and based on biblical narratives but include other subjects and details previously unknown. Although the material is typically a free reworking of biblical material, occasionally there is word-for-word translation or paraphrasing from Genesis.

Two noteworthy passages added to the account of Genesis are the story of Sarai's extraordinary beauty and Abram's exploration of the Promised Land through a dream. Sarai's beauty is praised greatly, using language similar to the Song of Songs, by Egyptian courtiers who have visited Abram, so much so that the Pharaoh abducts Sarai to be his wife. Abram's exploration of the Promised Land thoroughly describes a large extent of the geography of the Promised Land.

It has been noted that Genesis Apocryphon devotes more space to the role of women in biblical texts. For example, in the Apocryphon, Noah's wife is named Emzara. Also Noah's mother and the wife of Lamech is designated as Bitenosh. She is a unique character in the Apocryphon because she is given a voice to defend her fidelity when her husband suspects their son was fathered by an angel.

=== Essene parallels ===
Due to the scrolls' close proximity to Qumran, the date of composition and the relationship between 1 Enoch and the Book of Jubilees, some scholars believe the Essenes might be the authors of the Genesis Apocryphon, although others dispute this. For example, in The Oxford Handbook of the Dead Sea Scrolls (2010), Genesis Apocryphon is considered as a "non‐sectarian" text.

Since there have been no other copies found in the 820 fragments at Qumran, Roland de Vaux suggests that it could be the original autograph. The scroll does not present any Essene theology or exegetical, doctrinal meditations demonstrating a clear author. Nevertheless, the references to 1 Enoch, and parallels in the Book of Jubilees suggest that it was accepted and used at Qumran.

=== Cols. 0–5 ===
This passage is very fragmentary, but seems to contain the story of the Watchers (Heb: עירין) or Nephilim found in 1 Enoch 1–36, based on Gen 6:1–4. Columns 2–5 tell the story of the birth of Noah, using both third person accounts, and first person language from the point of view of Lamech, Noah's father. The text deals with Lamech and his wife. A portion of column 2 states:

She said to me, "O my master and [brother, recall for yourself] my pregnancy. I swear to you by the Great Holy One, by the Ruler of Hea[ven] that this seed is yours, that this pregnancy is from you, that from you is the planting of [this] fruit [and that it is] not from any alien, or from any of the Watchers, or from any heavenly bein[g.] - trans. by Reeves

The section closes with Lamech appealing to his father Methuselah to go and approach Enoch, who is Lamech's grandfather, for guidance on this dispute. Enoch tells Methuselah about the coming apocalypse, and tells him that the reason Noah is so beautiful is because he is righteous and is meant to father the new world. Enoch instructs Methuselah to assure Lamech that he is Noah's father. Columns 3–5 contain Enoch's speech, which overlaps well with the Aramaic text found in 1 Enoch 106–107 from 4QEn. It is this overlap that provides the strongest evidence that the Genesis Apocryphon was using the Book of Enoch as a source, rather than being dependent on common traditions.

=== Cols. 6–17 ===
This passage opens with the title "[A Copy of] The Book of the Words of Noah". In addition, the Aramaic word for "copy" parallels the Greek "A Copy of the Testament of X" in the Testaments of the Twelve Patriarchs. The framework for this section is established to be a "copy" of an authoritative record of either an edict or a patriarchal discourse. The narrative is written in first person from Noah's point of view and is his testament about the events that took place during his life. Column 6 begins with Noah's declaration that he is a righteous man who has been warned about darkness. He marries, has sons and daughters, and arranges marriages to the children of his brother for all his offspring, "in accordance with the law of the eternal statute" (col. 6, line 8).

Some time later, a Watcher, also known as "an emissary of the [Great] Holy One" (col. 6, line 13), comes to Noah with a warning about an upcoming flood. Noah heeds the being's proclamation, and thus survives the flood in an ark with his family. When the flood has ceased, the ark comes to rest in the Ararat mountains, and Noah leaves the boat to give a thank offering to God. He and his family explore the land and praise God for the beauty that is found there. God appears to Noah and makes a covenant with him to rule over the earth, so long as he and his sons do not consume blood. This covenant between God and man is made manifest by a rainbow "a sign for [Noah] in the clouds" (col. 12, line 1). Noah and his family adhere to the covenant by cultivating the land. Children are born to Noah's sons, and he plants a vineyard. Four years after the flood, Noah holds a festival in his vineyard to praise God. He falls asleep, drunk on wine, and a vision of a cedar and an olive tree comes to him. The interpretation of the vision is also granted to Noah; he is the cedar tree with many shoots because he will have many descendants. However, most of them will be evil, and a "man coming from the south of the land, the sickle in his hand, and fire with him" (col. 15, line 10) will come to judge those who rebel. The passage ends with a detailed description of how Noah divides up the land among his sons, who in turn divide their shares of land among their sons.

=== Cols. 19–22 ===
This series of columns is a retelling of the story of Abram, though with much closer adherence to the biblical Genesis than the Noah account, sometimes even translating portions of the Genesis text verbatim. Unfortunately, column 18 has been lost, but is speculated to have contained the beginning of the Abram story from Genesis 11–12, as column 19 begins with Abram already in Canaan. Prior to Abram's journey to Egypt, there is mention of him in Hebron, which is not mentioned in Genesis. However, it is recorded in Jubilees that he passes through Hebron, and in fact the remaining timeline of the Abram story in the Apocryphon follows the timeline in Jubilees.

Suffering from a famine, Abram decides to enter Egypt, the land of the children of Ham. Before entering Egypt, Abram receives revelation in the form of a dream. Abram dreams of a cedar tree and a date palm growing from a single root. People come to cut down and uproot the cedar, leaving the palm to itself. However, the date palm objects and says "Do not cut the cedar down, for the two of us grow from but a single root." So the cedar is spared and is not cut down. Abram deduces that he is the strong cedar, and that Pharaoh will seek to kill him while sparing Sarai. Abram instructs Sarai to say she is his sister so that they can avoid this. Sarai was very distressed by this dream as they entered Egypt, and for five years was exceedingly careful so that the Pharaoh of Zoan would not see her. Eventually members of the Egyptian court visit Abram and Sarai, and one attendant, Hyrcanos describes Sarai's wondrous beauty in a poem. In Column 20, Pharaoh had her brought to him after hearing of her immense beauty. Sarai ensures that Abram is spared by declaring he is her brother. Abram weeps along with Lot the night that Sarai is taken. He asks God to have vengeance and show his power against Pharaoh and his household. God sends a spirit to torment the Pharaoh of Zoan and the men of his household. After two years of attempting to understand why his household was afflicted, Pharaoh sent his attendant to Abram and Lot. Lot tells the attendant the truth, and Pharaoh becomes angry and sends Sarai back to Abram along with a substantial amount of wealth and gifts.

After leaving Egypt and settling back in Canaan Abram and Lot grow flocks together. Eventually they decide to divide their land since their flocks were too numerous and the land couldn't support them. After Abram and Lot split ways and Lot leaves, Abram is very generous and the text makes large note (col. 21, line 6) of his grief at their parting (line 7).

After this day Lot parted from me because of the conduct of our shepherds. He went and settled in the valley of the Jordan, and all his flocks with him, and I too added much to what he had. He kept pasturing his flocks and came to Sodom. He bought himself a house in Sodom and dwelt in it. I was dwelling on the mountain of Bethel, and it grieved me that Lot, the son of my brother, had parted from me. (col. 21, lines 5–7)

== Publication ==
The Genesis Apocryphon was the most damaged out of the first four scrolls found in Cave 1 making the publication history difficult, lengthy yet interesting. The scroll is dated palaeographical to 25 BC through 50 AD which coincides with the radiocarbon dating estimate of 89 BC – 118 AD. Due to its fragile condition the Genesis Apocryphon was the last to be identified. The extent of the damage included missing fragments, faded lettering, and patches of ink that had leaked through the parchment, requiring infrared imaging technology to render some passages legible. In April 1949 New Jersey, the scroll was partially unrolled for the scroll to be identified by John C. Trever. The portion read was identified as the previously lost "Book of Lamech". June 1, 1954, due to the growing controversy over the scrolls Samuel Marr placed the famous Wall Street Journal ad to sell the four Dead Sea Scrolls. The State of Israel bought the four scrolls and brought them to the Hebrew University of Jerusalem to be translated. In time, (1955), eight small fragments were excavated from Cave 1 believed to be a part of the fourth scroll. Józef Milik edited the fragments and published them under the name Apocalypse de Lamech based on Trever's previous identification; the fragments were given the publication number 20. All other texts related were added to this number 1Q20.

Avigad and Yigael Yadin led the initial major publication of the Genesis Apocryphon in 1956. It dealt mostly with the last three columns that were very well preserved. The publication included very meticulous transcriptions and translations that stood well against later re-readings and photographic technology. The Genesis Apocryphon was renamed at this time due to the additional reading about other patriarchs. Jonas C. Greenfield, Elisha Qimron, Morgenstern and Sivan published the rest of the unpublished columns in 1995. In between this time a German translation by Beyer and two commentaries by Joseph Fitzmyer was also published. Also, in 1991, Wise and Zuckerman arranged the eight fragments of 1Q20 and the Trever Fragment into a more coherent order. More recently a 3rd edition of Fitzmyer's commentary was published containing the newly publish columns. Martin Abegg and Michael Wise collaborated in 2005 to create an English translation of the Genesis Apocryphon. These publications and commentaries are not a complete list of translations and commentaries related to the Genesis Apocryphon but are the most significant.

== See also ==
- The Book of Giants
- Wives aboard Noah's Ark

== Bibliography ==
- Fitzmyer, Joseph A., The Genesis Apocryphon of Qumran Cave 1 (1Q20): A Commentary, 3rd ed., Biblica et orientalia 18B, Roma: Editrice Pontificio Istituto Biblico, 2004.
- García Martinez, F., and E.J.C. Tigchelaar (ed.) The Dead Sea Scrolls Study Edition, 2 vols. (Leiden: Brill, 1997–98) 1.26-48.
- Greenfield, Jonas C., and Elisha Qimron, "The Genesis Apocryphon Col. XII," Abr-Nahrain Supplement 3 (1992) 70–77
- Jongeling, B., C.J. Labuschagne, and A.S. van der Woude, Aramaic Texts from Qumran, Semitic Study Series 4 (Leiden: Brill, 1976) 77–119.
- Machiela, Daniel A., The Dead Sea Genesis Apocryphon: A New Text and Translation with Introduction and Special Treatment of Columns 13-17, Studies on the Texts of the Desert of Judah 79, Boston: Brill, 2009.
- Morgenstern, M., E. Qimron, and D. Sivan, "The Hitherto Unpublished Columns of the Genesis Apocryphon," Abr-Nahrain 33 (1995) 30–54.
- Qimron, Elisha, "Toward a New Edition of 1QGenesis Apocryphon." Pages 106–09 in The Provo International Conference on the Dead Sea Scrolls: Technological Innovations, New Texts, and Reformulated Issues. Edited by Donald W. Parry and Eugene Ulrich, Leiden: Brill, 1999.
- Wise, Michael Owen, et al. The Dead Sea Scrolls: A New Translation. New York : HarperSanFrancisco, c2005., 2005.
