= Discoveries in the Judaean Desert =

Collection of ancient texts

Discoveries in the Judaean Desert (DJD) is the official 40-volume publication that serves as the editio princeps for the Dead Sea Scrolls. It is published by Oxford University Press.

== Publication details ==
The international team of scholars, involved in the publishing project, consisted of 106 editors and contributors, and came from North America, Israel, and Europe. The manuscripts included in the series were discovered at the following archeological sites: Wadi Daliyeh, Ketef Jericho, Qumran, Wadi Murabba'at, Wadi Sdeir, Nahal Hever, Nahal Mishmar, and Nahal Se'elim. Approximately 1000 manuscripts were published during the run of the DJD-series. The manuscripts were in Hebrew, Aramaic, Arabic and Greek. The paleographical date of the texts ranged from c.250 BCE to the 11th century CE. Most volumes are written in English; a few volumes are in French. The volumes also covers analyses of archaeological data and archaeological missions. Volume 39 provides an introduction for, and summaries of, the preceding 38 volumes.

== Publication history ==
=== First wave of publication - Roland de Vaux, P. Benoit O.P ===
The first wave of publication took place between 1955 and 1982. In this period material from the findings at Qumran was published over seven volumes. Editor-in-chief of the first five volumes was Roland de Vaux. Based on notes provided by de Vaux in 1960 the original team of researchers appear to have consisted of the following eight scholars, in addition to himself: John M. Allegro, M. Baillet, F. M. Cross, C.H. Hunzinger, J.T. Milik, P.W. Skehan, J. Starcky, and John Strugnell.

The first work to appear was the 1955 release of Discoveries in the Judaean Desert, volume 1: Qumran Cave 1, edited by D. Barthélémy and Józef Milik, with contributions by R. de Vaux, G. M. Crowfoot, H. J. Plenderleith, and G. L. Harding. The publication was overseen by the Jordan Department of Antiquities, École Biblique et Archéologique Française and Palestine Archaeological Museum. The volume contained fragments of Biblical and Apocryphal books, as well as fragments of text from the Qumran collective such as the Rule of the Community, the Rule of the Congregation, the Collections of Blessings, the Warfare Scroll and the Songs of Thanksgiving. 1961 saw the publication of Discoveries in the Judaean Desert, volume 2: Les grottes de Murabba ât, edited by J. T. Milik, and R. de Vaux. The volume documented the activities of rebel leader Simon bar Kochba. The volume also established that Mishnaic Hebrew was "the language of the people of Judaea during the Persian and Greco-Roman period".

In the period from 1962 to 1968 the series (spanning vols. 3–4) was, for a limited time, published under the name Discoveries in the Judaean Desert of Jordan. 1962 saw the publication of Discoveries in the Judaean Desert, volume 3: Les ‘petites grottes’ de Qumrân, edited by Maurice Baillet, J. T. Milik, and Roland de Vaux. The volume covered the relationship between manuscripts and pottery, apocryphal and non-biblical texts, and the Copper Scroll. Biblical texts included fragments of Exodus and Kings. Non-Biblical texts included a description of the New Jerusalem and a reworking of the Ezekiel-material. The volume described the cutting of the Copper Scroll and suggested a non-Essene authorship for the scroll. 1965 saw the publication of Discoveries in the Judaean Desert, volume 4: The Psalms Scroll of Qumrân Cave 11 (11QPsa), edited by James A. Sanders. The scroll was unrolled in November 1961, and Sanders presented his manuscript in December 1962. The volume uncovered two types of psalms, canonical and apocryphal. Apocryphal psalms included A Plea for Deliverance, Apostrophe to Zion, Hymn to the Creator, and a small text called David's Composition. 1968 saw the publication of Discoveries in the Judaean Desert, volume 5: Qumrân Cave 4.I (4Q158–4Q186), edited by John M. Allegro with A.A. Anderson. The volume included manuscripts from Qumran cave 4. Among the works were commentaries (pesher texts), a biblical paraphrase, a Florilegium, Testimonia, Catenae (2), Tanhumim, lamentations, and a text titled The Ages of Creation. There were also commentaries on old testament books, such as Isaiah, Hosea, Micah, Nahum, Zephaniah and Psalms. In this period de Vaux was replaced by P. Benoit O.P, who oversaw volumes 6 and 7.

Volume 6 appeared in 1977 and was titled Discoveries in the Judaean Desert, volume 6: Qumrân grotte 4.II: I. Archéologie, II. Tefillin, Mezuzot et Targums (4Q128–4Q157), edited by J.T. Milik. The volume included fragments of biblical texts. The manuscripts had originally been recovered by local tribes, but were offered for sale and bought. 1982 saw the publication of Discoveries in the Judaean Desert, volume 7: Qumrân grotte 4.III (4Q482–4Q520), edited by Maurice Baillet. Baillet was originally not a member of the Cave 4 team, but after joining became known as the "small-fragments expert". The volume consisted of more than 2000 fragments of text. Among the documents uncovered were fragments from the War Scroll and liturgical documents. Among the liturgical titles was Paroles des luminaires, prayers for festivals, Cantiques du Sage, and Prieres quotidiennes. Prieres quotidiennes was a text that revealed the timing of evening and morning prayers.

=== Interim period - Controversy ===
This period marked the entrance of Eugene Ulrich. Important editorial work on the biblical scrolls were carried out by Ulrich, who, for a number of years, assumed special responsibility for this task. From 1985, and onwards, Ulrich functioned as chief editor of all the biblical texts from cave 4. In 1985-86 Emanuel Tov and Robert Kraft introduced computerized technology to the DJD-series. The forthcoming Volume 8 was prepared electronically.

Benoit's term as Editor-in-chief ended in 1986. He was replaced by John Strugnell of Harvard Divinity School, who assumed the task of Editor-in-chief as of volume 8. Volume 8 appeared in 1990 and was titled Discoveries in the Judaean Desert, volume 8: The Greek Minor Prophets Scroll from Nah al H ever (8H evXIIgr), edited by R.A Kraft. The volume included the Dead Sea Scroll of the Minor Prophets; Jonah, Micah, Nahum, Habakkuk, Zephaniah, and Zecharia. Towards the end of his editorship Strugnell made efforts to enlarge the international team of scholars.

Towards the end of the 1980s, and start of the 1990s, there was some controversy, in the international academic community, surrounding the slow pace of publication. Only eight volumes were published in the period 1955–1990, and it attracted criticism from several commentators. A few explanations for the delay in publication were given. Contributing factors included the lack of funding and scholarly resources.

=== Reorganization - New international team ===
Soon after this period of controversy, Emanuel Tov, of Hebrew University in Jerusalem, took over as editor in chief. Under the editorship of Tov, in the early 1990s, the international publishing team was reorganized and enlarged. The reorganization involved support from the Israel Antiquities Authority. During the peak of the publication project, in the 1990s, the international team consisted of ninety-eight scholars. In the ten years leading up to 2001 Dr. Tov and his team issued 28 volumes.

1992 saw the release of Discoveries in the Judaean Desert, volume 9: Qumran Cave 4.IV: Palaeo-Hebrew and Greek Biblical Manuscripts, edited by W. Skehan, E. Ulrich, and J. E. Sanderson. The volume included biblical manuscripts in Paleo-Hebrew and Greek. It was the first official publication of biblical scrolls from cave 4.

1994 saw the release of 3 volumes. Discoveries in the Judaean Desert, volume 10: Qumran Cave 4, V. Miqṣat Ma῾ase ha-Torah, edited by Elisha Qimron and John Strugnell, included a calendar of Sabbaths and holidays, issues of legal interpretation, and a final hortatory section. The manuscript does, according to the editors, throw light upon late Second Temple Judaism. Discoveries in the Judaean Desert, volume 12: Qumran Cave 4.VII: Genesis to Numbers, edited by E. Ulrich, F. M. Cross, and others, contained the first 4 books of the Pentateuch, and marked the start of the publication of scrolls written in Hebrew. It also included 4QExod–Levf, one of the oldest manuscripts of the Qumran findings. The volume also presented the conflicting views of editor Emanuel Tov, who proposed a local-text theory, and editor Frank Moore Cross, who proposed a multiple-text theory.Discoveries in the Judaean Desert, volume 13: Qumran Cave 4.VIII: Parabiblical Texts, Part 1, edited by H. Attridge and others, included fragments of Jubilees; Reworked Pentateuch; Prayer of Enosh; ParaKings; Paraphrase of Genesis and Exodus. The foreword of Volume 13 announced changes in the publishing plan. Volumes were now to be published according their literary genre.

1995 saw the release of two volumes. Discoveries in the Judaean Desert, volume 14: Qumran Cave 4.IX: Deuteronomy, Joshua, Judges, Kings, edited by E. Ulrich, Frank Moore Cross, and others, included fragments of Deuteronomy, Joshua, Judges, and Kings. The Qumran texts established a few minor readings that differed from the Masoretic text. Discoveries in the Judaean Desert, volume 19: Qumran Cave 4.XIV, Parabiblical Texts, Part 2, edited by M. Broshi and others, in consultation with James VanderKam, included fragmentary parabiblical texts, such as Tobit; apocryphal compositions of Moses; apocryphal compositions of Jeremia; pseudepigraphical work of Ezekiel; lists of false prophets and nethinim; admonition, discourse, exposition on the flood; Exodus/conquest tradition; the patriarchs; general narratives; unclassified fragments; and a text mentioning Zedekiah.

1996 saw the release of two volumes. Discoveries in the Judaean Desert, volume 18: Qumran Cave 4.XIII: The Damascus Document (4Q266–273), edited by Joseph M. Baumgarten, included the Damascus Document from Cave 4. Among the features of the document is a hortatory admonition, separating the Qumran group from its opponents; as well as internal laws of the Qumran community, indicating a priestly leadership. Discoveries in the Judaean Desert, volume 22: Qumran Cave 4.XVII: Parabiblical Texts, Part 3, edited by G. Brooke and others, in consultation with J. VanderKam, included parabiblical texts such as: Aramaic Levi Document, Testament of Naphtali, Prayer of Nabonidus, apocryphon of Daniel, pseudo-Daniel texts, commentaries on Genesis and Malachi, apocryphon of Joshua, and miscellaneous texts. Apocryphon of Daniel included the famous «Son of God excerpt» (4Q246) that had messianic connotations. The editor, Puech, argued that the text probably referred to Antiochus Epiphanes.

1997 saw the release of four volumes. Discoveries in the Judaean Desert, volume 15: Qumran Cave 4.X: The Prophets, edited by E. Ulrich and others, included fragmentary manuscripts of the latter Hebrew prophets. Discoveries in the Judaean Desert, volume 20: Qumran Cave 4.XV: Sapiential Texts, Part 1, edited by Torleif Elgvin, consisted of wisdom texts with overlaps of prophecy, psalms and apocalypticism. Two texts stand out: The Words of the Maskil to All Sons of Dawn, a text with esoteric content; and Mysteries, a text combining apocalyptic and sapiential imagery. Discoveries in the Judaean Desert, volume 24: Wadi Daliyeh Seal Impressions, edited by M.J.W. Leith, included seal impressions preserved on a group of bullae connected to the “Samaria Papyri.” The bullae and papyri were recovered from the Wadi Daliyeh cave by Bedouins. Discoveries in the Judaean Desert, volume 27: Aramaic, Hebrew, and Greek Documentary Texts from Nahal Hever and Other Sites, with an Appendix Containing Alleged Qumran Texts. (The Seiyâl Collection II), edited by H. M. Cotton and A. Yardeni, included legal documents from the Judaean Desert, such as texts related to deeds of sale; a renunciation of claims in a divorce; a promissory note; a receipt for dates; and the "archive" of Salome Komaïse. The book also included an appendix containing pseudo-Qumran manuscripts.

1998 saw the release of four volumes. Discoveries in the Judaean Desert, volume 11: Qumran Cave 4.VI: Poetical and Liturgical Texts, edited by E. Eshel and others, in consultation with J. VanderKam and M. Brady, included fragments of blessings, psalms, songs and prayers, including Songs of the Sabbath Sacrifice.Discoveries in the Judaean Desert, volume 23: Qumran Cave 11.II: 11Q2–18, 11Q20–30, edited by F. García Martínez, E.J.C. Tigchelaar, and A. S. van der Woude, was the largest in the series so far and included biblical manuscripts, such as Leviticus, Deuteronomy, Ezekiel, and Psalms; non-biblical manuscripts, such as Targum Job, Apocryphal Psalms and Jubilees; and sectarian manuscripts, such as Melchizedek, Sefer ha-Milhamah, Hymns, Shirot 'Olat ha-Shabbat, New Jerusalem, Temple, and Fragment related to Serekh ha-Yahad. Discoveries in the Judaean Desert, volume 25: Qumran Cave 4.XVIII: Textes hébreux (4Q521–4Q528, 4Q576–4Q579), edited by Emile Puech, included Hebrew fragmentary manuscripts of uncertain origin, including; Apocalypse messianique, Prophetie de Josué, Jonathan, Rouleau du Temple and Béatitudes. Discoveries in the Judaean Desert, volume 26: Qumran Cave 4.XIX: 4QSerekh Ha-Yah ad and Two Related Texts, edited by P. Alexander and Geza Vermes, included the sectarian manuscript Serekh Ha-Yahad, translated as Community Rule, or Manual of Discipline.

1999 saw the release of three volumes. Discoveries in the Judaean Desert, volume 29: Qumran Cave 4.XX: Poetical and Liturgical Texts, Part 2, edited by E. Chazon and others, in consultation with J. VanderKam and M. Brady, included poetical and liturgical fragments. Among the works were: Curses; Works containing prayers; Works of God and Communal Confession; Liturgical Work; Hodayot (Thanksgiving Hymns); Barkhi Nafshi; Lament by a Leader; Prayers (2 texts); Poetic Fragments; Self- Glorification Hymn; and Liturgical Works. The Hodayot text included the speaker who claims to be «exalted with the heavenly beings», whose identity had been the topic of some academic controversy. Eshel, the editor of this fragment, argued that the speaker should be identified with «the eschatological High Priest». According to the reviewer, the volume documents «early development of prayer and Halakha. Discoveries in the Judaean Desert, volume 34: Qumran Cave 4.XXIV: 4QInstruction (Musar leMevîn): 4Q415 ff, edited by J. Strugnell, D. J. Harrington, and T. Elgvin, in consultation with J. A. Fitzmyer, included a manuscript called 4QInstruction. Discoveries in the Judaean Desert, volume 35: Qumran Cave 4.XXV: Halakhic Texts, edited by J. Baumgarten and others, included fragmentary texts from Qumran. Among the works were Midrash Sefer Moshe; Halakhot (3 texts); Tohorot; a purification liturgy; a text on harvesting; and a ritual of purification. According to the reviewer, the manuscripts are a documentation of early Halakha, or postbiblical Jewish Law.

2000 saw the release of three volumes. Discoveries in the Judaean Desert, volume 16: Qumran Cave 4.XI: Psalms to Chronicles, edited by Eugene Ulrich and others, included biblical manuscripts and fragments of biblical manuscripts, including Psalms, Job, Proverbs, Ruth, Canticles, Qoheleth, Lamentations, Daniel, Ezra and Chronicles. It marked the end of publication of scrolls from Cave 4. Discoveries in the Judaean Desert, volume 36 Cryptic Texts; Miscellanea, Part 1: Qumran Cave 4.XXVI, edited by S. J. Pfann, P. Alexander and others, in consultation with J. VanderKam and M. Brady, included miscellaneous damaged texts from cave 4. Among the works were; Historical Texts; Pesher; and Ostracon. Discoveries in the Judaean Desert, volume 38: Miscellaneous Texts from the Judaean Desert, edited by J. Charlesworth and others, in consultation with J. VanderKam and M. Brady, included texts from the Judaean Desert, but found at other sites than Khirbet Qumran. Several of the texts are from Ketef Jericho, and includes deeds of sale and agricultural transactions. The volume also includes fragmentary biblical texts, hymns, and documentary texts from Wadi Sdeir, Nahal Hever, Wadi Seiyal, Nahal Mishmar and Nahal Se'elim. Biblical fragments include Genesis, Numbers, Deuteronomy and Psalms. Non-biblical texts include Prayer, Phylactery and Eschatological Hymn, and a Greek census list from Judaea or Arabia.

2001 saw the release of five volumes. Discoveries in the Judaean Desert, volume 21: Qumran Cave 4.XVI: Calendrical Texts, edited by S. Talmon, J. Ben Dov, and U. Glessmer, included the 64 day solar year of Jubilees. The fragmentary calendar documents were of the mishmarot type.Discoveries in the Judaean Desert, volume 28: Wadi Daliyeh II: The Samaria Papyri from Wadi Daliyeh; Qumran Cave 4.XXVIII: Miscellanea, Part 2, edited by D. M. Gropp, E. Schuller and others, in consultation with J. VanderKam and M. Brady, included the Samaria Papyri from Wadi Daliyeh and miscellaneous texts from Qumran. Discoveries in the Judaean Desert, volume 30: Qumran Cave 4.XXI: Parabiblical Texts, Part 4: Pseudo-Prophetic Texts, edited by D. Dimant, included pseudo-prophetic texts such as Pseudo-Ezekiel and Apocryphon of Jeremiah C. Discoveries in the Judaean Desert, volume 31: Qumran Cave 4.XXII: Textes araméens, première partie: 4Q529–549, edited by E. Puech, included apocryphal texts in Aramaic. Among the works we find Words of Michael; the Book of Giants; Birth of Noah; Testament of Judah; Testament of Jacob; Testament of Joseph; Apocryphon of Levi; Testament of Qahat; and Visions of Amram. The Birth of Noah included the expression 'elect of god', already a much debated excerpt in academic circles. Commentators disagree whether it is a messianic expression, or whether it is directed towards some other biblical figure such as Noah himself, or Melchizedek or Enoch. Discoveries in the Judaean Desert, volume 33: Qumran Cave 4.XXIII: Unidentified Fragments, edited by D. Pike and A. Skinner, included unidentified fragments of text.

2002 saw the release of Discoveries in the Judaean Desert, volume 39: The text from the Judaean Desert: Indices and an Introduction to the Discoveries in the Judaean Desert Series. The volume was edited by Emanuel Tov and was an introduction to, and an overview of, the whole DJD-series. The book also included a list of all the texts from the Judaean Desert; a categorization of the texts; and a chronological index.

2005 saw the publication of Discoveries in the Judaean Desert, volume 17: Qumran Cave 4. XII. 1–2 Samuel, edited by Frank More Cross, Donald W. Parry, Richard Saley and Eugene Ulrich. The volume included the texts of 1 and 2 Samuel. The researchers found that part of this text (4QSamc) was copied by the same scribe that had also copied several texts from Cave 1.

2009 saw the release of two volumes. Discoveries in the Judaean Desert, volume 37: Qumrân Grotte 4. XXVII – Textes araméens, deuxième partie: 4Q550–4Q575a, 4Q580–4Q587 et appendices, edited by Émile Puech, marked the end of publication of Aramaic texts from cave 4 and included the following titles: Jews at the Persian Court; Account; Four Kingdoms; New Jerusalem; Prophecy; Biblical Chronology; Magical Booklet; Horoscope; Wisdom Composition; Proverbs; Words of Michael; and Testament. One of the texts that had already attracted academic attention was New Jerusalem, which describes «the tour of a visionary guided by an angel around the city of Jerusalem». Discoveries in the Judaean Desert, volume 40: Qumran Cave 1. III. 1QHodayota with Incorporation of 1QHodayotb and 4QHodayot a–f, edited by Hartmut Stegemann with Eileen Schuller, included the principle edition of the Hodayot scroll, also called the Thanksgiving Scroll. In the book Eileen Schuller completes the previous work of Hartmut Stegemann. Emanuel Tov resigned as editor-in-chief the same year.

2010 saw the release of Discoveries in the Judaean Desert, volume 32: Qumran Cave 1. II: The Isaiah Scrolls. Part 1: Plates and Transcriptions. Part 2: Introductions, Commentary, and Textual Variants, edited by Eugene Ulrich and Peter W. Flint, with a contribution by Martin G. Abegg, Jr. The volume included the Isaiah scrolls from cave 1. The book was the last volume to be published in the DJD-series.

== Reception - recognition and criticism ==
Most of the volumes have been reviewed in academic journals and have been the object of recognition, as well as balanced criticism.

Roberts and Marcus reviewed Discoveries in the Judaean Desert, volume 1: Qumran Cave I. Roberts pointed out a few lapses in the transliterations, questioned a few of the interpretations, but concluded that it was an "extremely important edition of scroll-material". Marcus complimented the authors on their great effort and their contribution to the knowledge of the Qumran findings. On the other hand, he pointed out a few inconsistencies in the translation of texts, but only as a fair remark to an otherwise admirable publication.

Roberts reviewed Discoveries in the Judaean Desert, volume 3: Les ‘petites grottes’ de Qumrân, and observed a problem with different readings of the Copper Scroll. However, he remarked that the publication of the scroll marks a great achievement.

Dahood and Di Lella reviewed Discoveries in the Judaean Desert, volume 4: The Psalms Scroll of Qumrân Cave 11 (11QPsa). Dahood praised the achievement of J. Sanders but also commented upon a number of hermeneutical and philological problems in Sanders' translation. Di Lella brought attention to the Sir fragment and argued for a more thorough analysis of this text.

Winton, Roberts, and Fitzmyer reviewed Discoveries in the Judaean Desert, volume 5: Qumrân Cave 4.I (4Q158–4Q186). Winton commented upon the lack of an introduction to the texts and "the absence of any statement about the nature and significance of the text", but concluded with praising the achievement of the editor. Roberts observed that a change "in the editorial policy has left the volume rather bare and factual compared to its predecessors", but concluded that the volume was an "outstanding achievement". Fitzmyer offered several corrections and suggestions to the text of the volume.

Brooke, Knohl, and Sievers reviewed Discoveries in the Judaean Desert, volume 10: Qumran Cave 4, V. Miqṣat Ma῾ase ha-Torah. Brooke observed that the editors "with help from other scholars have tried to produce both an edition and a detailed commentary on the text", but "in this volume the two do not sit comfortably together". Knohl complimented the work of the editors, Strugnell and Qimron, but suggested a different dating for the scroll than the dating stated by the authors. Sievers discussed the inclusion of the calendar and concluded that it is «unlikely that a complete calendar formed part of the manuscript». He also brought attention to «textual uncertainties», but concluded that the editors had «produced a superb tool for future research».

Lim, who reviewed Discoveries in the Judaean Desert, volume 11: Qumran Cave 4.VI: Poetical and Liturgical Texts, observed syntactical difficulties in relation to the «King Jonathan fragment».

Fitzmyer, who reviewed Discoveries in the Judaean Desert, volume 14: Qumran Cave 4.IX: Deuteronomy, Joshua, Judges, Kings, observed that even though the texts were fragmentary «the testimony they bear is invaluable and will affect future text-critical study of the Pentateuch».

Brook, who reviewed Discoveries in the Judaean Desert, volume 15: Qumran Cave 4.X: The Prophets, questioned whether "some of these fragments, or groups of fragments", were proper biblical manuscripts, or whether they were excerpts that served other functions.

Davila, who reviewed Discoveries in the Judaean Desert, volume 16: Qumran Cave 4.XI: Psalms to Chronicles, noted that the «editor is to be commended for an especially full edition which includes very welcome detailed discussion and evaluation of the variant readings».

Hempel, who reviewed Discoveries in the Judaean Desert, volume 17: Qumran Cave 4. XII. 1–2 Samuel, concluded that «the value of the Qumran manuscripts of Samuel published here for the text of Samuel in particular as well for the field of textual criticism and Septuagint studies more broadly cannot be overestimated».

Bernstein, who reviewed Discoveries in the Judaean Desert, volume 18: Qumran Cave 4.XIII: The Damascus Document (4Q266–273), noted that «Baumgarten's edition is only a first step toward a comprehensive study of the Damascus Document in all of its textual witnesses, and of its interpretation within the larger Qumran legal corpus».

Lim and Douglas reviewed Discoveries in the Judaean Desert, volume 22: Qumran Cave 4.XVII: Parabiblical Texts, Part 3. Lim thanked the editors for producing «reliable editions of the text», and went on to observe that the «volume, published without delay, more than satisfactorily justifies the new policy of open access to the scrolls and the co-operation of an expanded team of scholars». Douglas complimented the editors for doing an "exemplary job of transcription", where they have "rendered the Aramaic and Hebrew into prose" and succeeded in making "these Dead Sea Scrolls accessible to the scholarly public".

Campbell, who reviewed Discoveries in the Judaean Desert, volume 23: Qumran Cave 11.II: 11Q2–18, 11Q20–30, concluded that the book was an "important addition to the series" for all "concerned with the text of the Bible, Second Temple Judaism and the identity of the group behind the Qumran scrolls".

Garrison, who reviewed Discoveries in the Judaean Desert, volume 24: Wadi Daliyeh Seal Impressions, had some minor criticisms to the presentation of seal imagery, but concluded that the «publication marks an extremely important contribution to the study of the material culture of Western Asia in the fourth century B.C.»

Douglas, who reviewed Discoveries in the Judaean Desert, volume 26: Qumran Cave 4.XIX: 4QSerekh Ha-Yah ad and Two Related Texts, remarked that the volume suffered from «belatedness», since the texts had already been made available in other publications. He then went on to observe that «yet laboring with full cognizance of their belatedness has spurred the authors to produce a work of extraordinary excellence».

Bagnall, who reviewed Discoveries in the Judaean Desert, volume 27: Aramaic, Hebrew, and Greek Documentary Texts from Nahal Hever and Other Sites, with an Appendix Containing Alleged Qumran Texts (The Seiyâl Collection II), noted that «papyrological researchers (and not they alone) may find the DJD numbering by cave number, site, and text number to have reached absurdity...», but concluded by praising the tedious work of the editors.

Hempel and Kugler reviewed Discoveries in the Judaean Desert, volume 31: Qumran Cave 4.XXII: Textes araméens, première partie: 4Q529–549. Hempel found it unfortunate that the publishing of the Book of Giants should span two volumes, volume 31 and 36, but concluded by praising the editor's «skills and experience as an epigrapher». Kugler praised the editor for his «very careful work with the manuscripts themselves and of highly original, imaginative reconstructions».

van der Kooij, who reviewed Discoveries in the Judaean Desert, volume 32: Qumran Cave 1. II: The Isaiah Scrolls. Part 1: Plates and Transcriptions. Part 2: Introductions, Commentary, and Textual Variants, had some critical remarks about spelling, readings, and the list of textual variants, but concluded that «this two-part Isaiah volume marks a major step in the study of the two Isaiah scrolls from Cave 1».

Crawford, who reviewed Discoveries in the Judaean Desert, volume 39: The text from the Judaean Desert: Indices and an Introduction to the Discoveries in the Judaean Desert Series, disagreed with some of the categorizations of the texts presented in the book, but concluded that «Tov and his collaborators are to be congratulated for producing this monumental final volume for what is a monumental series.»

== List of volumes ==
- Discoveries in the Judaean Desert, volume 1: D. Barthélemy, O.P. and J. T. Milik (1955). Qumran Cave 1. Oxford: Clarendon Press (xi + 163 pp. + xxxvii plates)
- Discoveries in the Judaean Desert, volume 2: P. Benoit, O.P., J. T. Milik, and R. de Vaux (1961). Les grottes de Murabba ât. Oxford: Clarendon Press (xv + 314 pp. + cvii plates)
- Discoveries in the Judaean Desert, volume 3: M. Baillet, J. T. Milik, and R. de Vaux (1962). Les ‘petites grottes’ de Qumrân. Oxford: Clarendon Press (xiii + 315 pp. + lxxi plates)
- Discoveries in the Judaean Desert, volume 4: J. A. Sanders (1965). The Psalms Scroll of Qumrân Cave 11 (11QPsa). Oxford: Clarendon Press (xi + 97 pp. + xvii plates)
- Discoveries in the Judaean Desert, volume 5: J. M. Allegro with A. A. Anderson (1968). Qumrân Cave 4.I (4Q158–4Q186). Oxford: Clarendon Press ( xii + 111 pp. + xxxi plates)
- Discoveries in the Judaean Desert, volume 6: R. de Vaux and J. T. Milik (1977). Qumrân grotte 4.II: I. Archéologie, II. Tefillin, Mezuzot et Targums (4Q128–4Q157). Oxford: Clarendon Press (xi + 91 pp. + xxviii plates)
- Discoveries in the Judaean Desert, volume 7: M. Baillet (1982). Qumrân grotte 4.III (4Q482–4Q520). Oxford: Clarendon Press (xiv + 339 pp. + lxxx plates.)
- Discoveries in the Judaean Desert, volume 8: E. Tov with the collaboration of R. A. Kraft (1990). The Greek Minor Prophets Scroll from Nah al H ever (8H evXIIgr). Oxford: Clarendon Press (Reprinted with corrections 1995. x + 169 pp. + xx plates)
- Discoveries in the Judaean Desert, volume 9: P. W. Skehan, E. Ulrich, and J. E. Sanderson (1992). Qumran Cave 4.IV: Palaeo-Hebrew and Greek Biblical Manuscripts. Oxford: Clarendon Press (xiii + 250 pp. + xlvii plates)
- Discoveries in the Judaean Desert, volume 10: E. Qimron and J. Strugnell (1994). Qumran Cave 4.V: Miqs a t Ma as ´e ha-Torah.Oxford: Clarendon Press (xiv + 235 pp. + viii plates)
- Discoveries in the Judaean Desert, volume 11: E. Eshel and others, in consultation with J. VanderKam and M. Brady (1998). Qumran Cave 4.VI: Poetical and Liturgical Texts, Part 1. Oxford: Clarendon Press. (xi + 473 pp. + xxxii plates)
- Discoveries in the Judaean Desert, volume 12: E. Ulrich, F. M. Cross, and others (1994). Qumran Cave 4.VII: Genesis to Numbers. Oxford: Clarendon Press (xv + 272 pp. + xlix plates)
- Discoveries in the Judaean Desert, volume 13: H. Attridge and others, in consultation with J. VanderKam (1994). Qumran Cave 4.VIII: Parabiblical Texts, Part 1. Oxford: Clarendon Press (x + 470 pp. + xliii plates)
- Discoveries in the Judaean Desert, volume 14: E. Ulrich, F. M. Cross, and others (1995). Qumran Cave 4.IX: Deuteronomy, Joshua, Judges, Kings. Oxford: Clarendon Press (xv + 183 pp. + xxxvii plates)
- Discoveries in the Judaean Desert, volume 15: E. Ulrich and others (1997). Qumran Cave 4.X: The Prophets. Oxford: Clarendon Press. (xv + 325 pp. + lxiv plates)
- Discoveries in the Judaean Desert, volume 16: E. Ulrich and others (2000). Qumran Cave 4.XI: Psalms to Chronicles. Oxford: Clarendon Press (xv + 302 pp. + xxxviii plates.)
- Discoveries in the Judaean Desert, volume 17: Frank More Cross, Donald W. Parry, Richard Saley and Eugene Ulrich (Editors) (2005). Qumran Cave 4. XII. 1–2 Samuel. Oxford: Clarendon Press (Pp. xix + 267. 17 Plates)
- Discoveries in the Judaean Desert, volume 18: J. M. Baumgarten (1996). Qumran Cave 4.XIII: The Damascus Document (4Q266–273). Oxford: Clarendon Press (xix + 236 pp. + xlii plates)
- Discoveries in the Judaean Desert, volume 19: M. Broshi and others, in consultation with J. VanderKam (1995). Qumran Cave 4.XIV, Parabiblical Texts, Part 2. Oxford: Clarendon Press. (xi + 267 pp. + xxix plates)
- Discoveries in the Judaean Desert, volume 20: T. Elgvin and others, in consultation with J. A. Fitzmyer, S.J. (1997). Qumran Cave 4.XV: Sapiential Texts, Part 1. Oxford: Clarendon Press (xi + 246 pp. + xviii plates)
- Discoveries in the Judaean Desert, volume 21: S. Talmon, J. Ben Dov, and U. Glessmer (2001). Qumran Cave 4.XVI: Calendrical Texts. Oxford: Clarendon Press. (xii + 263 pp. + xiii plates.)
- Discoveries in the Judaean Desert, volume 22: G. Brooke and others, in consultation with J. VanderKam (1996). Qumran Cave 4.XVII: Parabiblical Texts, Part 3. Oxford: Clarendon Press (xi + 352 pp. + xxix plates)
- Discoveries in the Judaean Desert, volume 23: F. García Martínez, E. J. C. Tigchelaar, and A. S. van der Woude (1998). Qumran Cave 11.II: 11Q2–18, 11Q20–30. Oxford: Clarendon Press. (xiii + 487 pp. + liv plates.)
- Discoveries in the Judaean Desert, volume 24: M. J. W. Leith (1997). Wadi Daliyeh Seal Impressions. Oxford: Clarendon Press. (xxv + 249 pp. + xxiv plates.)
- Discoveries in the Judaean Desert, volume 25: É. Puech (1998). Qumran Cave 4.XVIII: Textes hébreux (4Q521–4Q528, 4Q576–4Q579). Oxford: Clarendon Press. (xii + 229 pp. + xv plates)
- Discoveries in the Judaean Desert, volume 26: P. Alexander and G. Vermes (1998). Qumran Cave 4.XIX: 4QSerekh Ha-Yah ad and Two Related Texts. Oxford: Clarendon Press (xvii + 253 pp. + xxiv plates.)
- Discoveries in the Judaean Desert, volume 27: H. M. Cotton and A. Yardeni (1997). Aramaic, Hebrew, and Greek Documentary Texts from Nahal Hever and Other Sites, with an Appendix Containing Alleged Qumran Texts (The Seiyâl Collection II). Oxford: Clarendon, Press (xxvii + 381 pp. + 33 figures + lxi plates)
- Discoveries in the Judaean Desert, volume 28: D. M. Gropp (2001). Wadi Daliyeh II: The Samaria Papyri from Wadi Daliyeh; E. Schuller and others, in consultation with J. VanderKam and M. Brady, Qumran, Qumran Cave 4.XXVIII: Miscellanea, Part 2. Oxford: Clarendon Press (xv + 254 pp. + lxiii plates)
- Discoveries in the Judaean Desert, volume 29: E. Chazon and others, in consultation with J. VanderKam and M. Brady (1999). Qumran Cave 4.XX: Poetical and Liturgical Texts, Part 2. Oxford: Clarendon Press (xiii + 478 pp. + xxviii plates)
- Discoveries in the Judaean Desert, volume 30: D. Dimant (2001). Qumran Cave 4.XXI: Parabiblical Texts, Part 4: Pseudo-Prophetic Texts. Oxford: Clarendon Press (xiv + 278 pp. + xii plates)
- Discoveries in the Judaean Desert, volume 31: E. Puech (2001). Qumran Cave 4.XXII: Textes araméens, première partie: 4Q529–549. Oxford: Clarendon Press. (xviii + 439 pp. + xxii plates.)
- Discoveries in the Judaean Desert, volume 32: Eugene Ulrich and Peter W. Flint, with a contribution by Martin G. Abegg, Jr. (2010). Qumran Cave 1. II: The Isaiah Scrolls. Part 1: Plates and Transcriptions. Part 2: Introductions, Commentary, and Textual Variants. Oxford: Clarendon Press (pp. xxvii + 151; xviii + 260)
- Discoveries in the Judaean Desert, volume 33: D. Pike and A. Skinner (2001) Qumran Cave 4.XXIII: Unidentified Fragments. Oxford: Clarendon Press (xv + 376 pp. + xli plates.)
- Discoveries in the Judaean Desert, volume 34: J. Strugnell, D. J. Harrington, S.J., and T. Elgvin, in consultation with J. A. Fitzmyer, S.J. (1999). Qumran Cave 4.XXIV: 4QInstruction (Mu sa r le Me vîn): 4Q415 ff. Oxford: Clarendon Press (xvi + 584 pp. + xxxi plates)
- Discoveries in the Judaean Desert, volume 35: J. Baumgarten and others (1999). Qumran Cave 4.XXV: Halakhic Texts. Oxford: Clarendon Press (xi + 173 pp. + xii plates)
- Discoveries in the Judaean Desert, volume 36: S. J. Pfann (2000). Cryptic Texts; P. Alexander and others, in consultation with J. VanderKam and M. Brady, Miscellanea, Part 1: Qumran Cave 4.XXVI. Oxford: Clarendon Press (vi + 739 + xlix plates)
- Discoveries in the Judaean Desert, volume 37: Émile Puech (2009). Qumrân Grotte 4. XXVII – Textes araméens, deuxième partie: 4Q550–4Q575a, 4Q580–4Q587 et appendices. Oxford: Clarendon Press (pp. xxvi + 561 + 26 plates)
- Discoveries in the Judaean Desert, volume 38: J. Charlesworth and others, in consultation with J. VanderKam and M. Brady (2000). Miscellaneous Texts from the Judaean Desert. Oxford: Clarendon Press (xvii + 250 pp. + xxxvi plates)
- Discoveries in the Judaean Desert, volume 39: E. Tov (2002). The Texts from the Judaean Desert: Indices and an Introduction to the Discoveries in the Judaean Desert Series. Oxford: Clarendon Press (x + 452 pp.)
- Discoveries in the Judaean Desert, volume 40: Hartmut Stegemann with Eileen Schuller (Editors) (2009). Translation of Texts by Carol Newsom. Qumran Cave 1. III. 1QHodayota with Incorporation of 1QHodayotb and 4QHodayot a–f. Oxford: Clarendon Press (pp. xxi + 402 + 29 plates)

== See also ==
- Roland de Vaux
- Pierre Benoit (theologian)
- John Strugnell
- Eugene Ulrich
- Emanuel Tov
- Apocryphal
- Oxford University Press
