= Hartmut Stegemann =

German theologian

- Born: December 18, 1933; Gummersbach, Germany
- Died: August 22, 2005 (aged 71); Marburg, Germany
- Known for: standard methods for reconstructing scrolls

Academic background
- Education: University of Heidelberg; University of Bonn

Academic work
- Discipline: theology
- Institutions: University of Göttingen
- Main interests: Dead Sea Scrolls

Hartmut Stegemann (December 18, 1933, Gummersbach – August 22, 2005, Marburg/Lahn) was a German theologian with an interest in the New Testament and who specialized in Dead Sea Scrolls research. He was responsible for developing standard methods for reconstructing scrolls.

== Life ==
Stegemann began working on the scrolls in 1957 at the Qumran Research Center in Heidelberg. (He later became director of the Center.) In 1963 he was awarded a Ph.D. in Semitic studies and Religious Studies from the University of Heidelberg. This was also the year that he finished his reconstruction of the Thanksgiving Hymns scroll. Stegemann obtained his doctorate in Theology from Bonn in 1971. From 1971 to 1979 he held the post of professor at Philipps-Universität in Marburg, after which he took over from Hans Conzelmann at the Georg-August University in Göttingen, where he taught until the end of the summer 2005, when he retired. On his 65th birthday he was presented with a festschrift: Antikes Judentum und Frühes Christentum.

When Stegemann died he was working on a new publication of the Thanksgiving Hymns, based on his 1963 reconstruction with a new commentary and notes. Eileen Schuller finished the work which became Discoveries in the Judaean Desert Vol. 40.

== Publications ==
These include:

- The Library of Qumran: On the Essenes, Qumran, John the Baptist, and Jesus (Grand Rapids: Eerdmans, 1998) ISBN 0-8028-6167-9
- Qumran Cave 1.III: 1QHodayota: With Incorporation of 4QHodayota-f and 1QHodayotb, Discoveries in the Judaean Desert, vol. XL, editor with Eileen Schuller and Carol Newsom (Oxford: OUP, 2008) ISBN 0-19-955005-0
- "How to Connect Dead Sea Scroll Fragments" in Understanding the Dead Sea Scrolls, Shanks, Hershel, editor (New York: Vintage Books, 1992) 245–255.

Independent publications:

- Rekonstruktion der Hodajot. Ursprüngliche Gestalt und kritisch bearbeiteter Text der Hymnenrolle aus Höhle I von Qumran, Diss. phil. Heidelberg 1963.
- Die Entstehung der Qumrangemeinde, Diss. theol. Bonn 1965 (Neudruck 1971)
- Kyrios o Theos und Kyrios Jesus. Aufkommen und Ausbreitung des religiösen Gebrauchs von Kyrios und seine Verwendung im NT, Habilitationsschrift Bonn 1969
- Die Essener, Qumran, Johannes der Täufer und Jesus. Ein Sachbuch, Freiburg (u. a.) (Herder) 9. Auflage 1999. (auch engl., span., ital.)

Essays:

- Der lehrende Jesus. Der sog. biblische Christus und die geschichtliche Botschaft Jesu von der Gottesherrschaft, in: NZSTh 24 (1982), S. 3–20.
- How to connect the Dead Sea Scrolls, in: H. Shanks (Hrsg.): Understanding the Dead Sea Scrolls, New York 1992, S. 245–255; 309f.

== Sources ==
- Steudel, Annette (2006). "Prof. Dr. Dr. Hartmut STEGEMANN (1933-2005)". Revue de Qumrân. 22 (3 (87))): 327–333. JSTOR 24640860.
- Schröder, Bernd; Wojtkowiak, Heiko, eds. (2015). "Harmut Stegemann (1933-2005) - ein Leben fur die Erforschung der Texte vom Toten Meer". Stiftsgeschichten. V&R academic. Vandenhoeck & Ruprecht. pp. 327–334. ISBN 9783525570371.
- Who's who in Germany. Ab 8.1982/83: Sutter's international red series / Sutter's international red series (8 ed.). Intercontinental Book and Publishing Company. 1983.
