= 4Q369 =

Dead Sea Scroll found at Qumran Cave 4

4Q369, also known as the Prayer of Enosh, is one of the Dead Sea Scrolls found at Qumran Cave 4. The text was published in 1994 by editors Harold Attridge and John Strugnell as part of the DJD-series.

== Content ==
The proposal of the editors of DJD-13 was that the text contains prayers and prophecies attributed to Enosh, the father of Kenan, and Enoch, a biblical figure.

== Academic debate ==
James Kugel argued that the identity of the speaker is "far from clear" and that the text be conceptualized as a "prayer concerning God and Israel". Justin Pannkuk, on the other hand, supported the proposal of the editors, in a form-critical analysis, that attributed the prayers to Enosh. Vasile Babota referred to 4Q369 Prayer of Enosh as a parabiblical text but observed that it had little overlap with biblical texts, and perhaps should be re-classified.

== See also ==
- Dead Sea Scrolls
