= Book of Noah =

Non-extant pseudepigraphal work

The Book of Noah is thought to be a non-extant Old Testament pseudepigraphal work, attributed to Noah. It is quoted in several places in another pseudepigraphal work, 1 Enoch, and is mentioned in another, the Book of Jubilees. There have also been fragments attributed to a Book of Noah in other Dead Sea Scrolls, such as in Genesis Apocryphon.

== Fragments ==
Though this book has not come down to us independently, it has in large measure been incorporated in the Ethiopic Book of Enoch and can in part be reconstructed from it.

The Book of Noah is mentioned in Jubilees 10:13, 21:10. Chapters 58, 65-69:25 of the Ethiopic Enoch are without question derived from it. Thus 58 runs:

In the year 500, in the seventh month ... in the life of Enoch.

Here, the editor simply changed the name Noah in the context before him into Enoch, for the statement is based on Gen. 5:32, and Enoch lived only 365 years. Chapters 6-11 are clearly from the same source; for they make no reference to Enoch, but bring forward Noah (10:1) and treat of the sin of the angels that led to the flood, and of their temporal and eternal punishment. This section consists of the Semjaza and Azazel myths, and in its present composite form is already presupposed by 1 Enoch 88-90. Hence these chapters are earlier than 166 B.C. Chapters 106-107 of the same book are probably from the same source; likewise 54:7-55:2, and Jubilees 7:20-39, 10:1-15. In the former passage of Jubilees the subject-matter leads to this identification, as well as the fact that Noah is represented as speaking in the first person, although throughout Jubilees it is the angel that speaks. Possibly Eth. En. 41:3-8, 43-49, 59 are from the same work. The book may have opened with Eth. En. 106-107 On these chapters may have followed Eth. En. 6-11., 65-69:25, 60, 41:3-8, 43-44, 54:7-55:2; Jubilees 7:26-39, 10:1-15.

The Hebrew Book of Noah, a later work, is printed in Adolf Jellinek's Bet ha-Midrasch, 3:155-156, and translated into German in Rönsch, Das Buch der Jubiläen, 385-387. It is based on the part of the above Book of Noah which is preserved in the Book of Jubilees. The portion of this Hebrew work which is derived from the older work is reprinted in Charles's Ethiopic Version of the Hebrew Book of Jubilees, p. 179.

James Charlesworth writes (footnotes used for clarity)

During the early parts of the second century B.C. a pseudepigraphon circulated that contained considerable material concerning Noah. The tradition was not merely oral but had been written down, since the author of Jubilees and of an interpolation in the Testament of Levi 18:2 refer to a 'Book of Noah'.

The work is now lost except for excerpts preserved in 1 Enoch and Jubilees. The Genesis Apocryphon from the Qumran Cave 1 is another possible source.

=== Qumran texts ===
The Book of Noah text from Qumran is represented by 21 fragments preserved in Qumran Cave 4, which make up the manuscripts 4Q534-4Q536. This material was first published by Emile Puech in 2001 (original publication that was continued later).

Fragment 4Q534 of the Book of Noah in the Dead Sea Scrolls describes the physical appearance of the royal messiah:

On his hair a birthmark of reddish colour. And the shape of a lentil will be on his face, and small birthmarks on his thigh. And after two years he will know how to distinguish one thing from another in his heart. In his youth, he will be like ... a man who knows nothing until the time when he knows the three Books. And then he will acquire prudence and learn understanding ... wise seers come to him, to his knees. And with his father and his ancestors .. of brothers will hurt him. Counsel and prudence will be with him, and he will know the secrets of man. His wisdom will reach all the peoples, and he will know the secrets of all the living. And all their designs against him will come to nothing, and his rule over the living will be great. His designs will succeed, for he is the Elect of God. His birth and the breath of his spirit ... and his designs shall be for ever ...

Two Aramaic manuscripts from Qumran Cave 4 (4Q206 8 I + 9) also preserve some details regarding Noah and the flood. This is the text that has parallels to the Ethiopic narrative of the flood in the Animal Apocalypse (1 En. 89:1–9). According to Henryk Drawnel (2024), the Qumran witnesses contain a shorter text than the Ethiopic translation. The longer Ethiopic text contains certain details that add allusions to particular motifs present in the related Mesopotamian literature, such as the Old Babylonian poem Atrahasis, and the Epic of Gilgamesh, although there are no direct citations.

==== 1Q19 'Book of Noah' ====
The Hebrew scroll 1Q19 (also sometimes known as 'The Book of Noah') from Qumran is related both to 1 Enoch, and to Genesis Apocryphon. Ariel Feldman (2009) considers carefully the relationship between 1Q19 1-3 and 1 Enoch 8-9, and 106. There appear to be significant differences between these texts. He rules out a possibility that 1Q19 preserves a version of the Book of Enoch.

Also, some other scholars before suggested that 1Q19 is a source of 1 Enoch. For example, J.T. Milik at first identified 1Q19 with the original Book of Noah, but he later proposed that both 1Q19 and 1 En 6-11, 106-107 depend on the original Book of Noah. Also both Michael A. Knibb, and D. Dimant suggested that 1Q19 was a source of 1 Enoch. On the other hand, George Nickelsburg argued that 1Q19 was influenced by 1 Enoch.

But all the differences listed by Feldman make it more probable "that both works rely on a common exegetic tradition, reworked in different ways".

As far as the Genesis Apocryphon (1QapGen) and its relationship with 1Q19 is concerned, Feldman points out that the fragments relating the story of Noah’s birth are quite small and difficult to interpret in both manuscripts. Yet 1QapGen II-V fragments do provide some clear parallels to 1Q19 fragments. Thus, by analogy with 1 Enoch, Feldman suggests a common prior Enochic tradition behind both manuscripts.

== See also ==
- Genesis Apocryphon
