= The Rule of the Blessing =

Part of the Dead Sea Scrolls

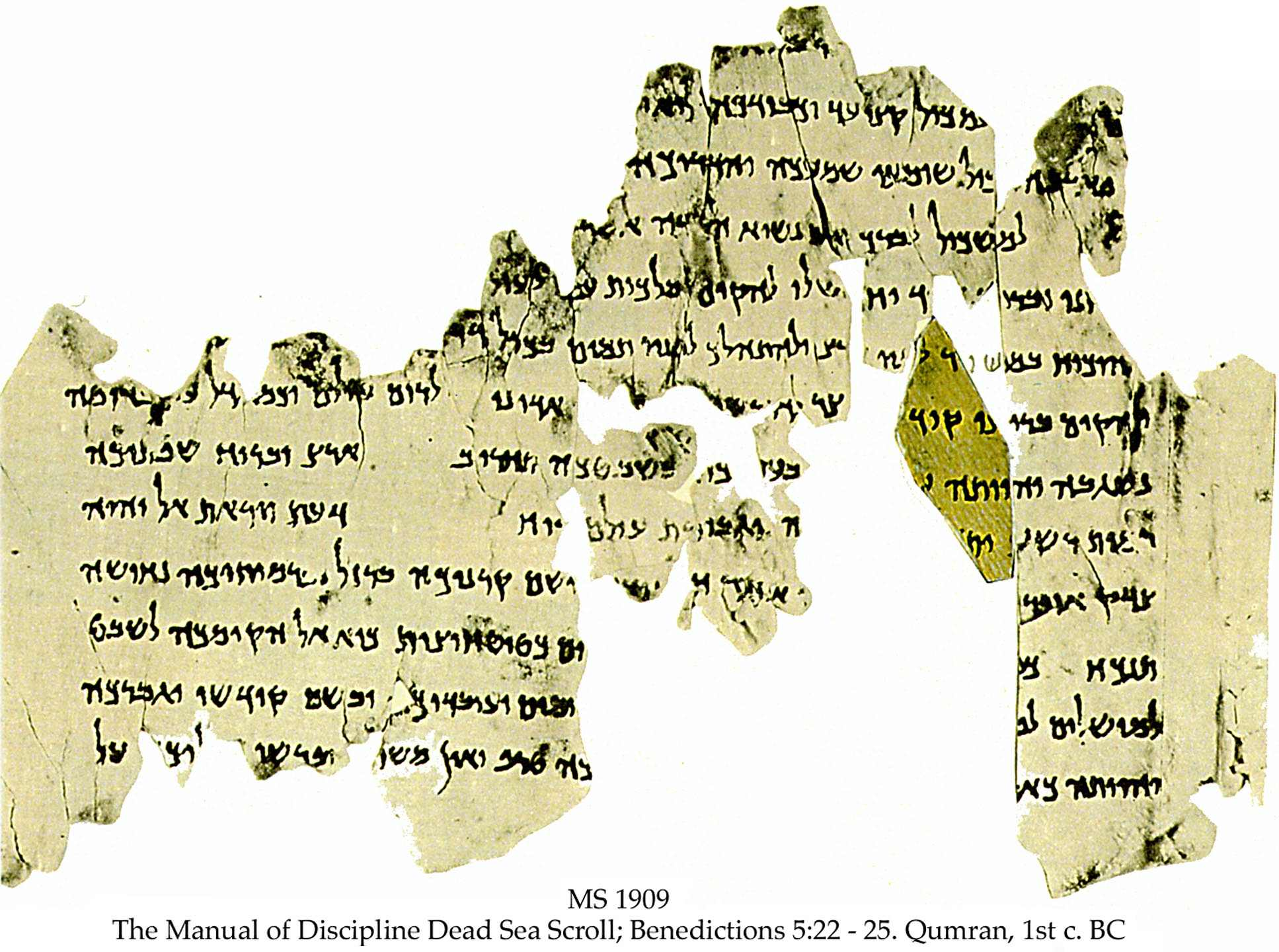
A portion of the "Manual of Discipline" or the "Rule of the Blessing" scroll, designated 1QSb, depicting Benedictions 5:22-25.

The Rule of the Blessing (1QSb) is a very fragmentary text once thought to be part of the text of the Community Rule scroll found in Cave 1 at Qumran as part of the Dead Sea Scrolls. It is added as one of two appendices (including the equally eschatological Rule of the Congregation) following the book of the Community Rule, on one of the first seven scrolls discovered at the Qumran site. The Rule of the Blessing includes three benedictions for use during the eschaton: one for the general assembly of the eschatological Tribe of Israel, which describes a sort of "living water" bringing them into a new covenant with God, one concerning the Kohen (priest) Sons of Zadok, chosen by God who will act "like angels" and lead Israel after the War. The third prayer is that for the messianic meal, to bless the "Prince", or Davidic messiah, who has come to deliver Israel. Similar prayers are found elsewhere in the scrolls, and some believe that this particular manuscript may be a collection of prayers for general, daily use.

== Bibliography ==
- Phillip R. Davies, George J. Brooke and Phillip R. Callaway. "The Complete World of the Dead Sea Scrolls", London: Thames and Hudson, 2002.
- Michael O. Wise, Martin G. Abegg Jr., and Edward M. Cook. "The Dead Sea Scrolls: A New Translation", San Francisco: HaperSanFrancisco, 2005.
- Lawrence H. Schiffman, The Eschatological Community of the Dead Sea Scrolls. Atlanta: Scholar's Press, 1989.
- Lawrence H. Schiffman, "Rule of the Congregation". The Encyclopedia of the Dead Sea Scrolls. Ed. Lawrence H. Schiffman and James C. Vanderkam. Oxford: Oxford University Press, 2000. 797–798.
