= The Rule of the Congregation =

Dead Sea Scroll appendix

The Rule of the Congregation (1QSa; Hebrew: סרך היחד and סרך הברכות) is an appendix to one of the first seven Dead Sea Scrolls discovered in caves near the Qumran site in 1946. Three related sectarian documents were discovered in Qumran Cave 1: The Community Rule (1QS), The Rule of the Congregation (1QSa), and The Rule of the Blessing (1QSb). The Rule of the Congregation and the Rule of the Blessing were initially overlooked by researchers and considered a continuation of the much longer Community Rule.

Since their discovery, the two passages have been called many names, including "The Messianic Rule", "The Charter for Israel in the Last Days", "The Rule of the Benedictions", and "A Priestly Blessing for the Last Days".
