= Community Rule =

One of the Dead Sea Scrolls

The Community Rule (Hebrew: סרך היחד), which is designated 1QS and was previously referred to as the Manual of Discipline, is one of the first scrolls to be discovered near the ruins of Qumran, the scrolls found in the eleven caves between 1947 and 1954 are now referred to simply as the Dead Sea Scrolls. The Rule of the Community is a crucial sectarian document and is seen as definitive for classifying other compositions as sectarian or non-sectarian (1QpHabakkuk; 1QM; the Hodayot; and CD are other core sectarian documents). Among the nearly 350 documents (900+ manuscripts) discovered, roughly 30% of the scrolls are classified as "sectarian."

== Discovery ==
The most complete manuscript of the Community Rule was found in Cave 1, and was first called the Manual of Discipline by Millar Burrows, because one of the texts reminded him of a Methodist text titled Discipline. It is now designated 1QS (which stands for Cave 1 / Qumran / Serekh (Hebrew for 'rule')). Numerous other fragments of this document, containing variant readings, were found in caves 4 and 5 (4QS^{a–j}, 5Q11, 5Q13). Two other documents, known as the Rule of the Congregation (1QSa) and the Rule of the Blessing (1QSb), are found on the same scroll as 1QS and while they were originally thought to be part of the Community Rule are now considered separate compositions and appendices. The Community Rule texts contain dualistic writings with possible Zoroastrian and Roman influences. They talk of War between Angel of Evil, represented as Darkness or Satan and the Son(s) of the Israelite God, represented as light.

== Community ==
There is some debate about the identification of the community described in 1QS. The most significant question that has been asked and debated is the relationship of the scroll to the ruins of the nearby settlement. While the vast majority of scholars would argue that a Jewish religious community in the Second Temple period occupied the site at Qumran and owned the scrolls found in caves nearby, a larger issue related to their identity as "Essenes" continues to be debated to this day. Striking similarities are found between the site of Qumran and the rites and practices described in 1QS. Most noteworthy is the concern in 1QS for ritual purity by immersion and the discovery of nearly ten mikva'ot (ritual baths) at Qumran. Much of the debate about the communities' identification with Essenes has centered on comparing and contrasting Josephus' descriptions of Essenes (he describes other "philosophical schools" such as Pharisees and Sadducees) with the details that emerge from sectarian literature found at Qumran (esp. 1QS) and the site itself. Josephus, for example, describes initiates to a male monastic order who are given a trowel for use when defecating (they are to dig a hole in private, away from the group, and ease their bowels while covering themselves with their robe), a detail about toilet habits that he finds amusing and entertaining for his readership. And yet, the discovery of a toilet at Qumran seems to contradict Josephus. Another question that has arisen, among others, when identifying Josephus' Essenes (see also Philo and Pliny) to the group at Qumran is the presence or absence of women. The cemetery adjacent to the settlement has only been partially excavated, and there appear to be at least a few skeletal remains of women, which some interpret as contradicting an association between the Essenes and the group there.

Scholars of earliest Christianity have traditionally taken note of 1QS because it refers to the messiahs of Aaron and Israel (ix 9–11). This and other writings from the Dead Sea Scrolls have opened a window to the past, allowing us to understand ideas and developments related to the religious milieu near the time of earliest Christianity.

== Variant readings ==
As opposed to 1QS, manuscript 4QS^{d} (4Q258) has the word God written in paleo-Hebrew letters 𐤀𐤋 "ʾEl", as can be seen on an infrared picture at the Dead Sea Scrolls Digital Library. In addition, 4QS^{d} does not mention 'the Priests, the Sons of Zadok' as does 1QS. Finally, 4QS^{d} and 4QS^{b} read 'ha-rabbim' (the Congregation).

== Relationship with other texts from Qumran ==
The text is likely one of the oldest documents original to the community, with a hypothesized composition date of around 100 BC, and the 1QS scroll being written about 25 years after. According to Geza Vermes, "no writings in ancient Jewish sources parallel to the Community Rule, but a similar type of literature flourished among Christians" during the early church, including such texts as the Didache, the Didascalia, and the Apostolic Constitution.

The Community Rule is closely related to the Damascus Document, another Qumran text. The conclusion of the Damascus Document, which has only been preserved in fragments, largely contains the same text as the Community Rule. The structure and terminology used in both works also show similarities. However, there are also differences, particularly in the choice of words. For example, the community in the Damascus Document (as well as in 1QSa, the Community Rule) is consistently referred to as עדה (edah), as opposed to יחד (jachad) in the Community Rule.

According to Charlotte Hempel, the relationship between the Damascus Document and the Community Rule "has been a central issue in Scrolls scholarship" ever since it became clear that the Damascus Document, which was already known before from the Cairo Geniza, is also represented in Qumran.

In 1998, Hempel argued that the Community Rule represents a community the parent group of which were the creators of the Damascus Document, which was an older document.

On the other hand, according to Annette Steudel (2012), the literary comparison of the Community Rule and the Damascus Document shows that the Damascus Document represents a rewriting of the Community Rule. She shows that the Damascus Document closely follows the text of the Community Rule, and specifically of the sections 1QS V-VII. Also she shows that the long Fourth Admonition in the Damascus Document is basically an elaboration of the passage 1QS V, l-7a.

Nevertheless, she also argues that this relationship between the two documents doesn’t end there, because there also appears to be a complex interplay between these two documents. A later passage in the Community Rule (1QS VIII-IX) might have been composed as a reaction to the rewriting/reinterpretation that was offered by the Damascus Document, as mentioned above. So, at a later stage, these two documents appear to be in a dialogue with each other.

The figure of the Teacher of Righteousness is well known from the Damascus Document, and yet he is not mentioned in the Community Rule as such. So he may be a later figure in this community.

== Messianic expectations ==
In the study of the messianic expectations of the Qumran community, 1QS IX 10-11 has played an important role. The text reads: '... until the prophet comes and the anointed of Aaron and of Israel'. From the passage it becomes clear that the Qumran community expected (at least) two messiah figures, one of whom ('the messiah of Aaron') is characterized as a high priest and the other ('the messiah of Israel') as a political leader. This expectation also appears in several other places in the Dead Sea Scrolls.

The authors of this text "imagined a future in which the Priest Messiah would preside over a 'Messianic banquet' with the King Messiah of Israel".

== See also ==
- The Rule of the Congregation
- The Rule of the Blessing
- Teacher of Righteousness
