= War of the Sons of Light Against the Sons of Darkness =

Jewish manual from the Dead Sea Scrolls

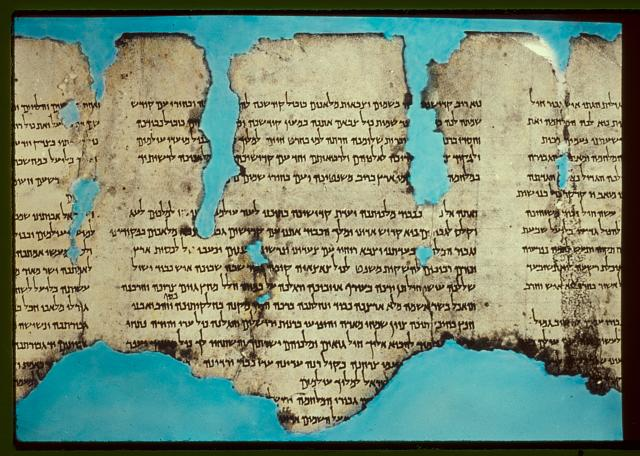
The War Scroll, found in Qumran Cave 1

The War of the Sons of Light Against the Sons of Darkness, also known as War Rule, Rule of War and the War Scroll, is a manual for military organization and strategy that was discovered among the Dead Sea Scrolls. The manuscript was among the scrolls found in Qumran Cave 1, acquired by the Hebrew University of Jerusalem and first published posthumously by Eleazar Sukenik in 1955. The document is made up of various scrolls and fragments including 1QM, and 4Q491–497. It is possible that The War of the Messiah is the conclusion to this document. The 4Q491–497 fragments were published by Maurice Baillet in Discoveries in the Judaean Desert, volume 7 and comprise a shorter recension of the War Scroll.

== History ==
Two time periods have been put forward and defended as the most probable time of composition: the Seleucid period and the Roman period. The Seleucid period proposals include the very beginning of the Maccabean Revolt (165 or 164 BCE), the height of Jonathan's military power (143 BCE), and the reign of John Hyrcanus (135–104 BCE). Scholars who believe the scroll was composed during the Roman period propose a date from the middle of the 1st century BCE to the first decade of the 1st century CE. The War Scroll's description of the weaponry and tactics led Yigael Yadin to assign the composition of the scroll to a date between the capture of Jerusalem by Pompey (65 BCE) and the death of Herod (4 BCE). More recently, author Russell Gmirkin disagrees with Yadin's analysis and assigns the weaponry described in the War Scroll to the 2nd century BCE. Lt. Col. Peter Fromm (US Army Ret.) sides with Gmirkin also assigning the army and weaponry described in the War Scroll to the 2nd century BCE.

Scholars have been unable to determine the exact author of the text. The unity and cohesiveness of the manuscript leads some, such as Jean Carmignac and Yigael Yadin, to believe that it was written or compiled by a single writer. Most scholars believe, at this point, that it is a composite document, copied from many source documents by one scribe.

In modern times, the genre of 1QM has been described as apocalyptic literature, though some translators and interpreters contend that it is actually a part of sectarian liturgy or tactical treatises. Jean Duhaime believes that it was probably classified as a part of the serek (rule) texts developed by the Qumranites.

== Contents ==
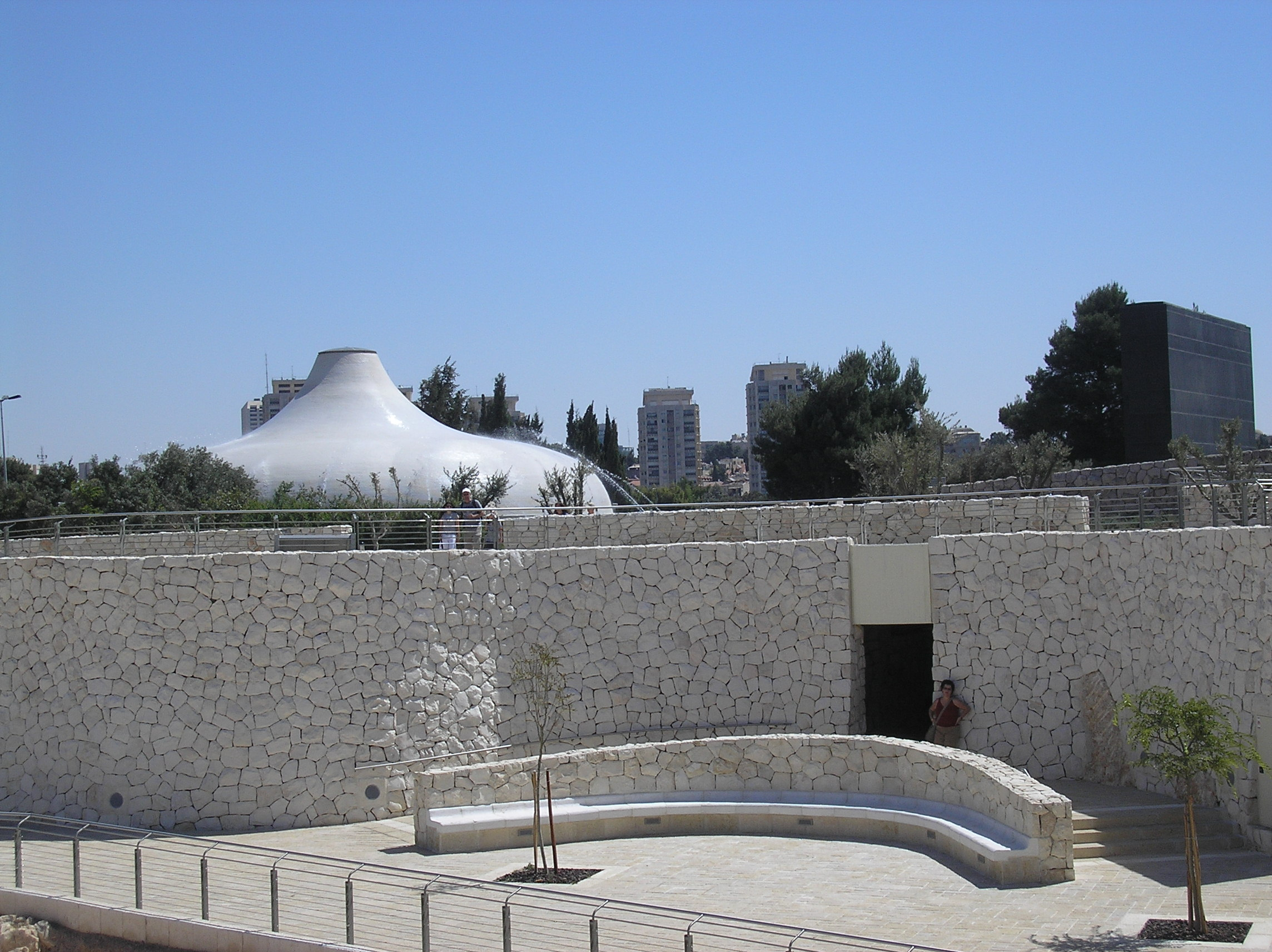
The Shrine of the Book, a wing of the Israel Museum in Jerusalem, is built to symbolize the scroll. The shrine is built as a white dome symbolizing the Sons of Light, and a black basalt wall symbolizing the Sons of Darkness.

These scrolls contain an apocalyptic prophecy of a war between the Sons of Light and the Sons of Darkness. The war is described in two distinct parts, first (the War against the Kittim) described as a battle between the Sons of Light, consisting of the sons of Levi, the sons of Judah, and the sons of Benjamin, and the exiled of the desert, against Edom, Moab, the sons of Ammon, the Amalekites, and Philistia and their allies the Kittim of Asshur (referred to collectively as the army of Belial), and [those who assist them from among the wicked] who "violate the covenant". The second part of the war (the War of Divisions) is described as the Sons of Light, now the united twelve tribes of Israel, conquering the "nations of vanity". In the end, all of Darkness is to be destroyed and Light will live in peace for all eternity. The text goes on to detail inscriptions for trumpets and banners for the war and liturgies for the priests during the conflict.

There are many key differences in the way the War against the Kittim and the War of Divisions are described. The War against the Kittim is referred to as a day of battle in best-of-seven format, with the Sons of Light and the Sons of Darkness each winning three of the first six before final victory for the Sons of Light by divine intervention in the seventh. While it is unclear if this is meant as a literal 24-hour period, it does not seem to describe a protracted battle. After the War against the Kittim there is a six-year period of preparation culminating in the restoration of the Temple in Jerusalem. The beginning of the description of the War of Divisions says that there are 33 years of war remaining of the total 40 years of the war. In the War against the Kittim each side will fight alongside angelic hosts and supernatural beings and final victory is achieved for the Sons of Light directly by the hand of God. In the War of Divisions, on the other hand, there is no mention of angels or supernatural allies fighting alongside either the tribes of Israel or the Nations. Another distinction is that in the War against the Kittim the Sons of Light face defeat three times before victory, but in the War of Divisions there is not mention of defeat or setbacks of any kind.

Yigael Yadin and Géza Vermes have argued that the descriptions of the armament, equipment and formation of the Sons of Light suggest a basis in Roman methods of warfare.

== Structure ==
1QM consists of 19 columns, of which the first 14–19 lines of each have been preserved.

i. Summarizes the War against the Kittim.
ii. Summarizes the War of Divisions telling of a total forty years of combat.
iii–ix. Deal almost exclusively with the inscriptions meant to be displayed on banners, trumpets, darts, etc.
x–xiv. A number of liturgical pieces, which seem meant for the War of Divisions, but explicitly mention the Kittim, possibly because these are a later addition stemming from a tradition of a more universal fight against the Kittim.
xv–xix. Describes the seven-stage battle, led by the priests, between Light and Darkness, the War against the Kittim. The battle is finally won by divine intervention.

== Links with other scrolls ==
The War Scroll contributes significantly to our understanding of History in the Dead Sea Scrolls. But, perhaps surprisingly, there are hardly any direct ‘historical accounts’ in this collection, or any historical texts in the modern understanding of these words. The authors of these documents typically use veiled language when referring to their own community and its history.

Nevertheless, there are also other war-related texts among the Qumran documents that can provide further background, and some notable links that can be made. In the Community Rule (1QS), for example, the theme of a binary opposition between Light and Dark can be seen. Both include dualistic blessing and cursing liturgies. The "congregation of Israel" in its organization within 1QM can be compared to The Rule of the Congregation (1QSa), as it is described as being broken into thousands, hundreds, fifties and tens, with age limits listed for specific types of service within ranks. Also of note is the single/multiple messiah discrepancy between several of the texts. The War Scroll makes reference to "messiahs" in the plural (1QM 11:7), as does the Community Rule (1QS 9:11); the Rule of the Congregation explicitly mentions only one (1QSa 2:21-22).
