= Thanksgiving Hymns =

Dead Sea Scroll discovered in 1947

The Thanksgiving Scroll was one of the first seven Dead Sea Scrolls discovered in 1947 by the Bedouin. The scroll gets its name from the recurring use of the phrase "I thank you" in many of the poems. The Hebrew word Hodayot refers to "thanks" or "thanksgiving". Other names include Thanksgiving Hymns, Thanksgiving Psalms, Hymns Scroll and Scroll of Hymns.

The main scroll found in 1947 is designated 1QH^{a}. Other fragments of this text have been found in Caves 1 and 4 (1Q35, 4Q427–432). But even when these readings are added to 1QH^{a}, there is still a substantial amount of text missing.

The style of the hymns is so similar to that of the Old Testament that scholars have described it as a "mosaic of Old Testament Texts". Like the biblical "psalms of lament", they employ intimate and personal language.

The content varies from poem to poem but there are certainly overriding themes: first and foremost the scroll talks about and to God and is usually contrasted with the weakness, dependency, unworthiness and wretchedness of the human condition (thereby exalting God’s power and perfection even more). Other main themes include: salvation of the just and destruction of the wicked, gratitude for divine insight, personal (?) accounts of exile/persecution (and God delivering the speaker from such plights). To use the last subject as an example, here is a quote from the text showing both how personal the language is and the thanks awarded to God for his mercy:

"the wicked of the people rush against me with their afflictions, and all the day long they crush my soul. But You, O my God, turn the tempest to a whisper, and the life of the distressed You have brought to safety as a bird from the snare and as prey from the power of lions" (1QH, Col. 13 lines 17–19).

There are several theories regarding how the Hodayot were used. Some believe they were daily prayers, or a moral instruction booklet or even war songs sung after a victory. Menahem Mansoor holds that The Thanksgiving scroll was a private psalter for a select group within a community that modeled the correct way to praise God for deliverance.

The cave 1 Thanksgiving Hymns (1QH^{a} and 1QH^{b}) was among the seven original scrolls recovered at Qumran Cave 1 by the Bedouin in the year 1947. There were two different groupings of textual evidence that were found. The first contained twelve columns of script with up to forty lines of text each. The second included six columns and sixty-six fragments that were found. The problem with this particular discovery is that the quality of the text and its legibility. The text on the materials is preserved with numerous lacunae and requires much evaluation in order to decipher the structure and meaning behind a number of the hymns in 1QH^{a}.

Scholars have debated the identity of specific sections of the hymns as it is unclear what the text signifies in terms of organization of the different sections. However, it is clear to many that the opening line "I thank Thee, O Lord" "אודכה אדוני" is indicative of the beginning of an individual hymn. There are also other opening statements used by the Hymns such as "Blessed be Thou, O Lord", "I thank you, Lord", and "I thank you, my God".

There are numerous Hodayot-like texts that were located in both cave 1 and cave 4 at Qumran. The largest of the documents was found at cave 1 (1QH^{a}) as well as a second copy of the hymns which was in worse condition (1QH^{b}). Cave 4 included six documents considered to be associated with the Thanksgiving Hymns: (4Q427–32, 4Q433, 433a, 4Q440, and 440a). The argument can be made that because these fragments were found in more than multiple caves, the Thanksgiving Hymns were of importance to the community at Qumran.

There are two sets of literature involved in the entire work of the Hymns. The first set of poetic works is centered on the idea of one's self or "I". This set speaks of feelings, beliefs, and messages of destiny. The speaker in many of the poems is considered to perhaps be a figure called "The Teacher or Righteousness". The second set of poetic works was involved mainly with, as VanderKam describes as "regular members of the community" and no extraordinary claims were made by the poet. This section of the hymns is concerned with central themes of obedience to God, God judges evil, knowledge to God's followers, and the righteous praise God.
