= Royal psalms =

Hermann Gunkel categorized ten psalms by their subject matter of kingship as royal psalms. Specifically, the royal psalms deal with the spiritual role of kings in the worship of Yahweh. Aside from that single qualification, there is nothing else which specifically links the ten psalms. Each of the psalms make explicit references to their subject, the king. However, it has been posited that other psalms, which do not mention the king directly, may have been written for royalty (e.g. Psalm 22).

Old Testament scholar Brevard Childs has raised the possibility that the royal psalms are strategically scattered throughout the psalter. According to Childs, these psalms are often paired with other psalms that give the royal psalms an eschatological and messianic sense.

== Gunkel's royal psalms ==
First lines from King James Version.

- Psalm 2 ("Why do the heathen rage, and the people imagine a vain thing?")
- Psalm 18 ("I love you, O Lord, my strength.")
- Psalm 20 ("The LORD hear thee in the day of trouble; the name of the God of Jacob defend thee")
- Psalm 21 ("The king shall joy in thy strength, O LORD; and in thy salvation how greatly shall he rejoice!")
- Psalm 45 ("My heart is inditing a good matter: I speak of the things which I have made touching the king: my tongue is the pen of a ready writer.")
- Psalm 72 ("Give the king thy judgments, O God, and thy righteousness unto the king's son.")
- Psalm 101 ("I will sing of mercy and judgment: unto thee, O Lord, will I sing.")
- Psalm 110 ("The Lord said unto my lord, Sit thou at my right hand, until I make thine enemies thy footstool.")
- Psalm 132 ("Lord, remember David, and all his afflictions")
- Psalm 144 ("Blessed be the Lord my strength which teacheth my hands to war, and my fingers to fight")

== Other royal psalms ==
Additionally, Psalms 93, 94, 95, 96, 97, 98, and 99 are called royal psalms because they "celebrate God as King".
