= Psalm 94 =

94th psalm of the book of psalms

- "O LORD God, to whom vengeance belongeth"
- Royal Psalm
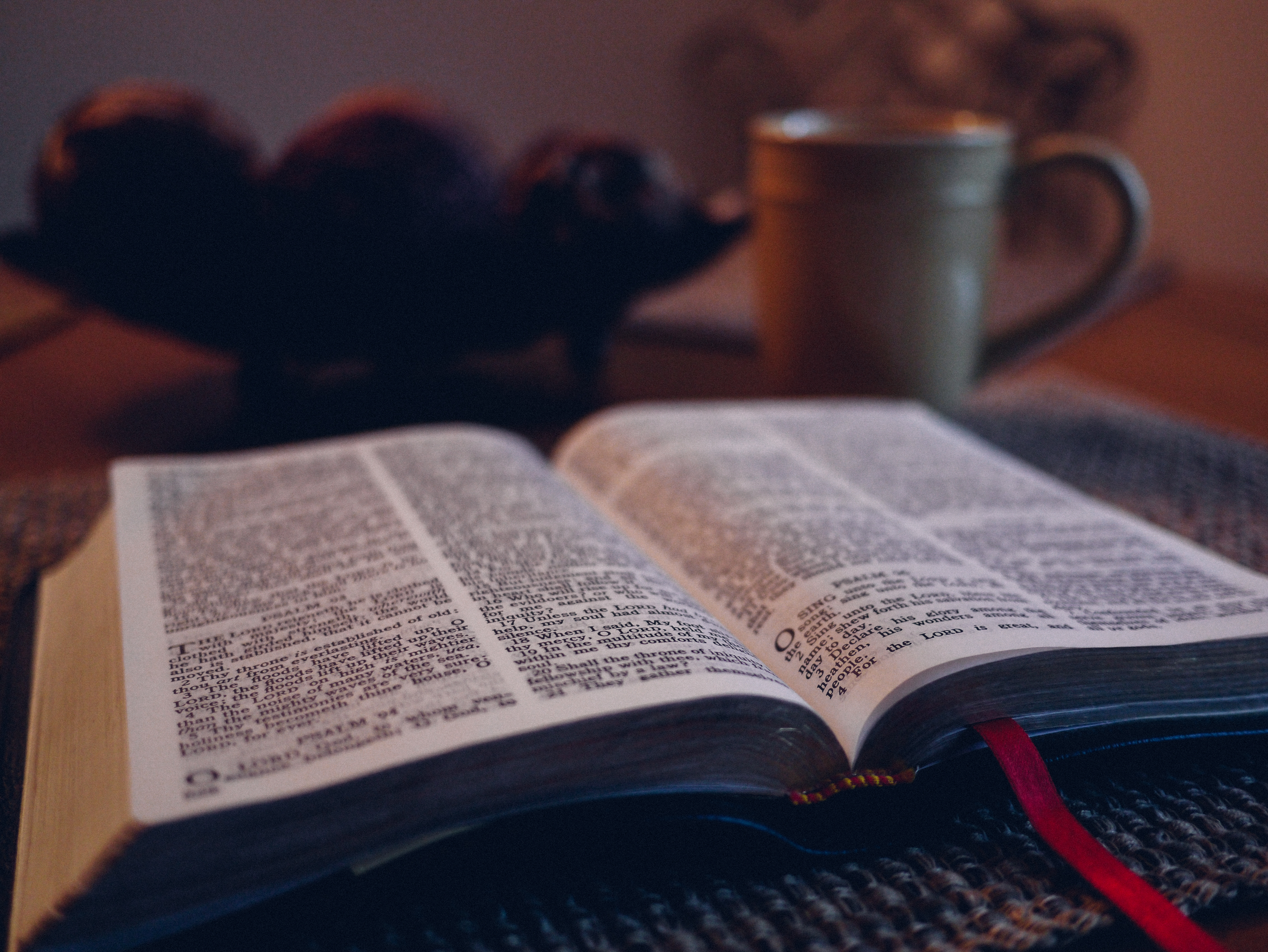
- English Bible open at Psalm 94
- Other name: Psalm 93; "Deus ultionum"
- Language: Biblical Hebrew

Psalm 94
- ← Psalm 93 Psalm 95 →
- Book: Book of Psalms
- Hebrew Bible part: Ketuvim
- Order in the Hebrew part: 1
- Category: Sifrei Emet
- Christian Bible part: Old Testament
- Order in the Christian part: 19

Psalm 94 is the 94th psalm of the Book of Psalms, beginning in English in the King James Version: "O LORD God, to whom vengeance belongeth". In the slightly different numbering system used in the Greek Septuagint and Latin Vulgate translations of the Bible, this psalm is Psalm 93. In Latin, it is known as "Deus ultionum". This psalm is referred to as one of the Royal Psalms, Psalms 93–99, praising God as the King of His people, although as Gordon Churchyard notes, God is referred to here as judge rather than king.

Alexander Kirkpatrick divides it into two sections. In the first section, up to verse 11, the psalmist calls on God "to manifest Himself as judge of the earth", while "the second part of the Psalm is occupied with thoughts of consolation for times of trouble".

The psalm forms a regular part of Jewish and Catholic liturgies. It has been set to music, for example by Baroque composers Heinrich Schütz and Johann Sebastian Bach (cantata BWV 21) in German. Julius Reubke composed the Sonata on the 94th Psalm for organ, first performed in 1857.

== Uses ==
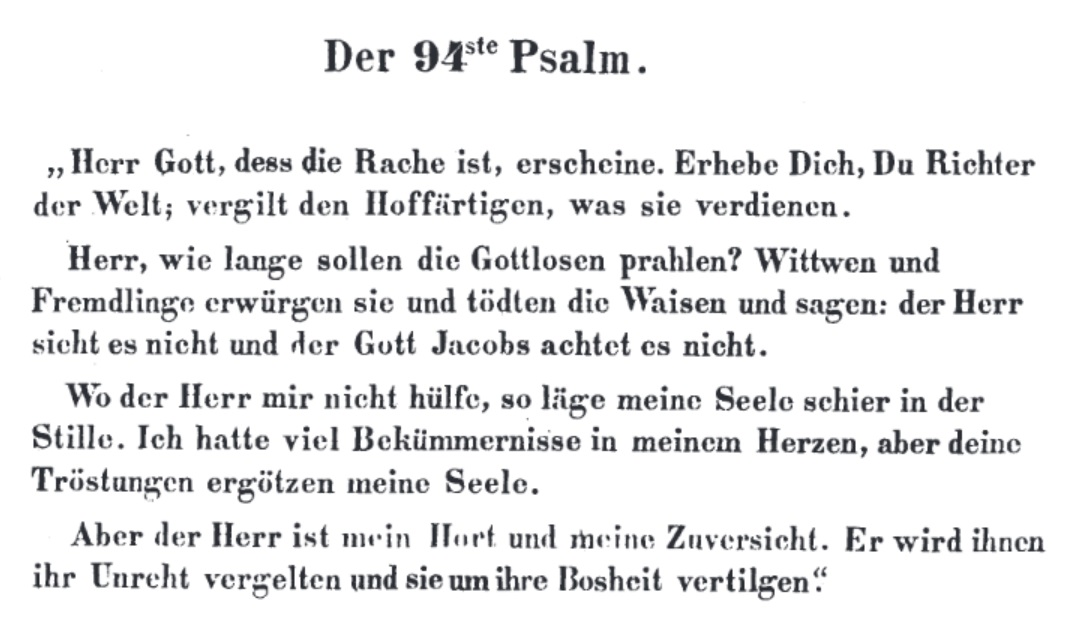
Verses 1,3,17 and 22 from Psalm 94, beginning the four sections of Reubke's Sonata

=== New Testament ===
- Verse 11 is quoted in 1 Corinthians 3:20.
- Verse 14 is quoted in Romans 11:1, 2.

=== Judaism ===
- Is recited in its entirety, along with the first three verses of Psalm 95, as the psalm of the day for the Shir Shel Yom of Wednesday.
- Is recited on the fifth day of Sukkot.
- Verse 1 is part of Mishnah Tamid 7:4.
- Verse 1-2 are the sixth and seventh verses of V'hu Rachum in Pesukei Dezimra.
- Verse 14 is the sixteenth verse of Yehi Kivod in Pesukei Dezimra.

=== Literature ===
Israeli historian Dina Porat titled her book about the Nakam group which sought revenge for the Holocaust "Vengeance and Retribution are Mine" to express her belief that humans should leave revenge for God.

=== Monuments ===
The beginning of verse 15 from Psalm 94 is quoted at the Peace Tower in Ottawa, a Canadian landmark.

=== Musical settings ===
Heinrich Schütz set the Psalm 94 in a metred version in German as part of the Becker Psalter, first published in 1628, "Gott, dem alle Rach heimfällt", SWV 192.

Sonata on the 94th Psalm for organ was composed by Julius Reubke, a student of Franz Liszt, and first performed in 1857; It is programmatically based on selected verses, 1-3, 6-7, 17, 19, 22-23, and became a staple of the organ repertoire.

== Text ==
The following table shows the Hebrew text of the Psalm with vowels, alongside the Koine Greek text in the Septuagint and the English translation from the King James Version. Note that the meaning can slightly differ between these versions, as the Septuagint and the Masoretic Text come from different textual traditions. (Note: A 1917 translation directly from Hebrew to English by the Jewish Publication Society can be found here or here, and an 1844 translation directly from the Septuagint by L. C. L. Brenton can be found here. Both translations are in the public domain.) In the Septuagint, this psalm is numbered Psalm 93.

#	Hebrew	English	Greek
1	אֵל־נְקָמ֥וֹת יְהֹוָ֑ה אֵ֖ל נְקָמ֣וֹת הוֹפִֽיעַ׃	O LORD God, to whom vengeance belongeth; O God, to whom vengeance belongeth, shew thyself.	Ψαλμὸς τῷ Δαυΐδ, τετράδι σαββάτου. - ΘΕΟΣ ἐκδικήσεων Κύριος, Θεὸς ἐκδικήσεων ἐπαρρησιάσατο.
2	הִ֭נָּשֵׂא שֹׁפֵ֣ט הָאָ֑רֶץ הָשֵׁ֥ב גְּ֝מ֗וּל עַל־גֵּאִֽים׃	Lift up thyself, thou judge of the earth: render a reward to the proud.	ὑψώθητι ὁ κρίνων τὴν γῆν, ἀπόδος ἀνταπόδοσιν τοῖς ὑπερηφάνοις.
3	עַד־מָתַ֖י רְשָׁעִ֥ים ׀ יְהֹוָ֑ה עַד־מָ֝תַ֗י רְשָׁעִ֥ים יַעֲלֹֽזוּ׃	LORD, how long shall the wicked, how long shall the wicked triumph?	ἕως πότε ἁμαρτωλοί, Κύριε, ἕως πότε ἁμαρτωλοὶ καυχήσονται,
4	יַבִּ֣יעוּ יְדַבְּר֣וּ עָתָ֑ק יִ֝תְאַמְּר֗וּ כׇּל־פֹּ֥עֲלֵי אָֽוֶן׃	How long shall they utter and speak hard things? and all the workers of iniquity boast themselves?	φθέγξονται καὶ λαλήσουσιν ἀδικίαν, λαλήσουσι πάντες οἱ ἐργαζόμενοι τὴν ἀνομίαν;
5	עַמְּךָ֣ יְהֹוָ֣ה יְדַכְּא֑וּ וְֽנַחֲלָתְךָ֥ יְעַנּֽוּ׃	They break in pieces thy people, O LORD, and afflict thine heritage.	τὸν λαόν σου, Κύριε, ἐταπείνωσαν καὶ τὴν κληρονομίαν σου ἐκάκωσαν,
6	אַלְמָנָ֣ה וְגֵ֣ר יַהֲרֹ֑גוּ וִ֖יתוֹמִ֣ים יְרַצֵּֽחוּ׃	They slay the widow and the stranger, and murder the fatherless.	χήραν καὶ ὀρφανὸν ἀπέκτειναν, καὶ προσήλυτον ἐφόνευσαν
7	וַ֭יֹּ֣אמְרוּ לֹ֣א יִרְאֶה־יָּ֑הּ וְלֹא־יָ֝בִ֗ין אֱלֹהֵ֥י יַעֲקֹֽב׃	Yet they say, The LORD shall not see, neither shall the God of Jacob regard it.	καὶ εἶπαν· οὐκ ὄψεται Κύριος, οὐδὲ συνήσει ὁ Θεὸς τοῦ ᾿Ιακώβ.
8	בִּ֭ינוּ בֹּעֲרִ֣ים בָּעָ֑ם וּ֝כְסִילִ֗ים מָתַ֥י תַּשְׂכִּֽילוּ׃	Understand, ye brutish among the people: and ye fools, when will ye be wise?	σύνετε δή, ἄφρονες ἐν τῷ λαῷ· καί, μωροί, ποτὲ φρονήσατε.
9	הֲנֹ֣טַֽע אֹ֭זֶן הֲלֹ֣א יִשְׁמָ֑ע אִֽם־יֹ֥צֵֽר עַ֝֗יִן הֲלֹ֣א יַבִּֽיט׃	He that planted the ear, shall he not hear? he that formed the eye, shall he not see?	ὁ φυτεύσας τὸ οὖς οὐχὶ ἀκούει; ἢ ὁ πλάσας τὸν ὀφθαλμὸν οὐχὶ κατανοεῖ;
10	הֲיֹסֵ֣ר גּ֭וֹיִם הֲלֹ֣א יוֹכִ֑יחַ הַֽמְלַמֵּ֖ד אָדָ֣ם דָּֽעַת׃	He that chastiseth the heathen, shall not he correct? he that teacheth man knowledge, shall not he know?	ὁ παιδεύων ἔθνη οὐχὶ ἐλέγξει; ὁ διδάσκων ἄνθρωπον γνῶσιν;
11	יְֽהֹוָ֗ה יֹ֭דֵעַ מַחְשְׁב֣וֹת אָדָ֑ם כִּי־הֵ֥מָּה הָֽבֶל׃	The LORD knoweth the thoughts of man, that they are vanity.	Κύριος γινώσκει τοὺς διαλογισμοὺς τῶν ἀνθρώπων ὅτι εἰσὶ μάταιοι.
12	אַשְׁרֵ֤י ׀ הַגֶּ֣בֶר אֲשֶׁר־תְּיַסְּרֶ֣נּוּ יָּ֑הּ וּֽמִתּוֹרָתְךָ֥ תְלַמְּדֶֽנּוּ׃	Blessed is the man whom thou chastenest, O LORD, and teachest him out of thy law;	μακάριος ὁ ἄνθρωπος, ὃν ἂν παιδεύσῃς, Κύριε, καὶ ἐκ τοῦ νόμου σου διδάξῃς αὐτὸν
13	לְהַשְׁקִ֣יט ל֭וֹ מִ֣ימֵי רָ֑ע עַ֤ד יִכָּרֶ֖ה לָרָשָׁ֣ע שָֽׁחַת׃	That thou mayest give him rest from the days of adversity, until the pit be digged for the wicked.	τοῦ πραΰναι αὐτὸν ἀφ᾿ ἡμερῶν πονηρῶν, ἕως οὗ ὀρυγῇ τῷ ἁμαρτωλῷ βόθρος.
14	כִּ֤י ׀ לֹא־יִטֹּ֣שׁ יְהֹוָ֣ה עַמּ֑וֹ וְ֝נַחֲלָת֗וֹ לֹ֣א יַעֲזֹֽב׃	For the LORD will not cast off his people, neither will he forsake his inheritance.	ὅτι οὐκ ἀπώσεται Κύριος τὸν λαὸν αὐτοῦ καὶ τὴν κληρονομίαν αὐτοῦ οὐκ ἐγκαταλείψει,
15	כִּֽי־עַד־צֶ֭דֶק יָשׁ֣וּב מִשְׁפָּ֑ט וְ֝אַחֲרָ֗יו כׇּל־יִשְׁרֵי־לֵֽב׃	But judgment shall return unto righteousness: and all the upright in heart shall follow it.	ἕως οὗ δικαιοσύνη ἐπιστρέψῃ εἰς κρίσιν καὶ ἐχόμενοι αὐτῆς πάντες οἱ εὐθεῖς τῇ καρδίᾳ. (διάψαλμα).
16	מִֽי־יָק֣וּם לִ֭י עִם־מְרֵעִ֑ים מִי־יִתְיַצֵּ֥ב לִ֝֗י עִם־פֹּ֥עֲלֵי אָֽוֶן׃	Who will rise up for me against the evildoers? or who will stand up for me against the workers of iniquity?	τίς ἀναστήσεταί μοι ἐπὶ πονηρευομένοις; ἢ τίς συμπαραστήσεταί μοι ἐπὶ τοὺς ἐργαζομένους τὴν ἀνομίαν;
17	לוּלֵ֣י יְ֭הֹוָה עֶזְרָ֣תָה לִּ֑י כִּמְעַ֓ט ׀ שָׁכְנָ֖ה דוּמָ֣ה נַפְשִֽׁי׃	Unless the LORD had been my help, my soul had almost dwelt in silence.	εἰ μὴ ὅτι Κύριος ἐβοήθησέ μοι, παρὰ βραχὺ παρῴκησε τῷ ᾅδῃ ἡ ψυχή μου.
18	אִם־אָ֭מַרְתִּי מָ֣טָה רַגְלִ֑י חַסְדְּךָ֥ יְ֝הֹוָ֗ה יִסְעָדֵֽנִי׃	When I said, My foot slippeth; thy mercy, O LORD, held me up.	εἰ ἔλεγον· σεσάλευται ὁ πούς μου, τὸ ἔλεός σου, Κύριε, ἐβοήθει μοι.
19	בְּרֹ֣ב שַׂרְעַפַּ֣י בְּקִרְבִּ֑י תַּ֝נְחוּמֶ֗יךָ יְֽשַׁעַשְׁע֥וּ נַפְשִֽׁי׃	In the multitude of my thoughts within me thy comforts delight my soul.	Κύριε, κατὰ τὸ πλῆθος τῶν ὀδυνῶν μου ἐν τῇ καρδίᾳ μου αἱ παρακλήσεις σου εὔφραναν τὴν ψυχήν μου.
20	הַֽ֭יְחׇבְרְךָ כִּסֵּ֣א הַוּ֑וֹת יֹצֵ֖ר עָמָ֣ל עֲלֵי־חֹֽק׃	Shall the throne of iniquity have fellowship with thee, which frameth mischief by a law?	μὴ συμπροσέστω σοι θρόνος ἀνομίας, ὁ πλάσσων κόπον ἐπὶ πρόσταγμα.
21	יָ֭גוֹדּוּ עַל־נֶ֣פֶשׁ צַדִּ֑יק וְדָ֖ם נָקִ֣י יַרְשִֽׁיעוּ׃	They gather themselves together against the soul of the righteous, and condemn the innocent blood.	θηρεύσουσιν ἐπὶ ψυχὴν δικαίου καὶ αἷμα ἀθῷον καταδικάσονται.
22	וַיְהִ֬י יְהֹוָ֣ה לִ֣י לְמִשְׂגָּ֑ב וֵ֝אלֹהַ֗י לְצ֣וּר מַחְסִֽי׃	But the LORD is my defence; and my God is the rock of my refuge.	καὶ ἐγένετό μοι Κύριος εἰς καταφυγὴν καὶ ὁ Θεός μου εἰς βοηθὸν ἐλπίδος μου·
23	וַיָּ֤שֶׁב עֲלֵיהֶ֨ם ׀ אֶת־אוֹנָ֗ם וּבְרָעָתָ֥ם יַצְמִיתֵ֑ם יַ֝צְמִיתֵ֗ם יְהֹוָ֥ה אֱלֹהֵֽינוּ׃	And he shall bring upon them their own iniquity, and shall cut them off in their own wickedness; yea, the LORD our God shall cut them off.	καὶ ἀποδώσει αὐτοῖς Κύριος τὴν ἀνομίαν αὐτῶν, καὶ κατὰ τὴν πονηρίαν αὐτῶν ἀφανιεῖ αὐτοὺς Κύριος ὁ Θεός.
