= Verona Cathedral =

Church building in Verona, Italy

Coordinates: 45.447045°N 10.996849°E

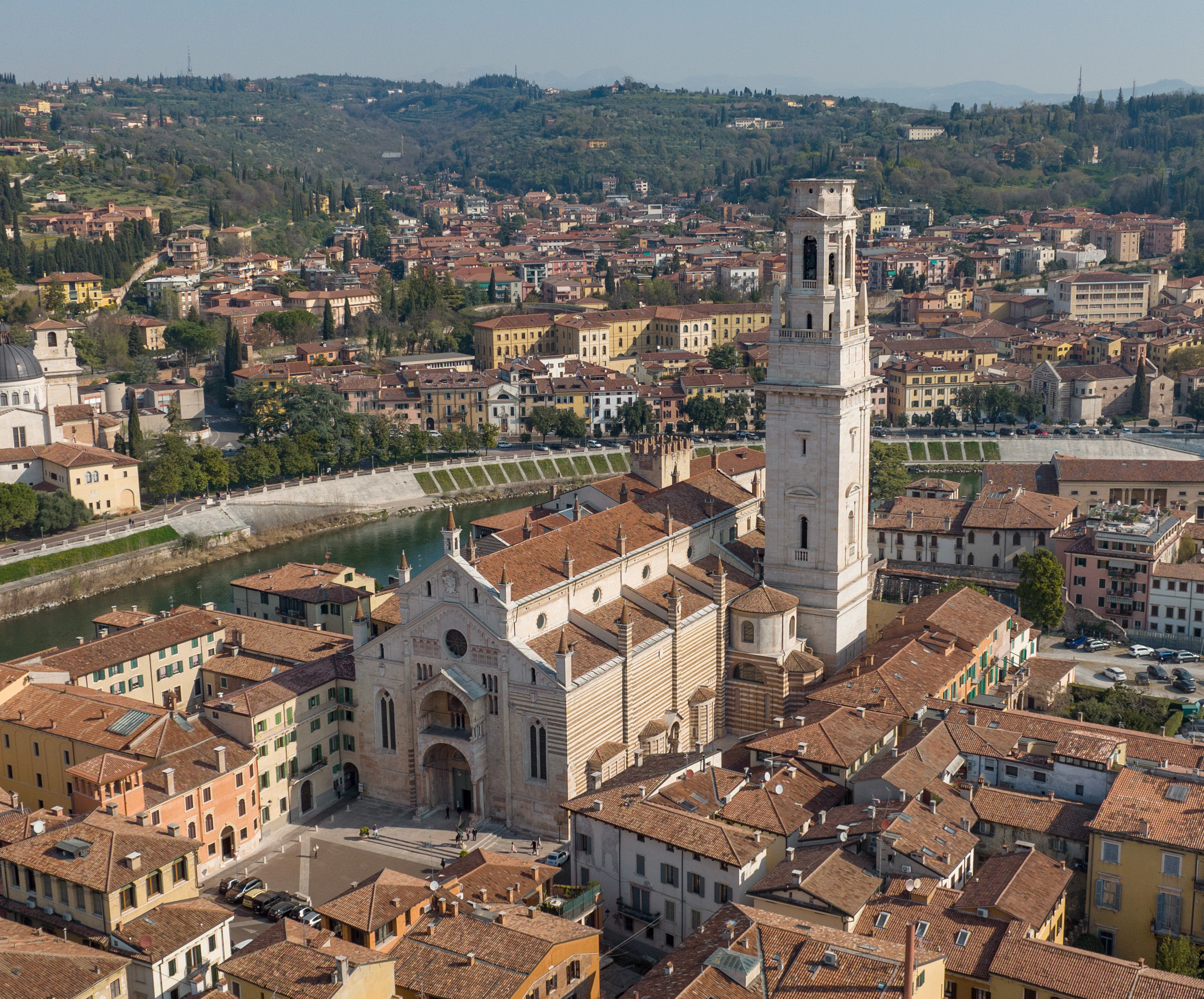
Verona Cathedral (2022)

Verona Cathedral (Italian: Cattedrale Santa Maria Matricolare; Duomo di Verona) is a Roman Catholic cathedral in Verona, northern Italy, dedicated to the Blessed Virgin Mary under the designation Santa Maria Matricolare. It is the episcopal seat of the Diocese of Verona.

It was erected after two Palaeo-Christian churches on the same site had been destroyed by an earthquake in 1117. Built in Romanesque style, the cathedral was consecrated on September 13, 1187. The structure was later modified by several renovation interventions, although the plan has remained unchanged.

== Exterior ==
The façade is divided into three parts, with a pediment and a two storied projecting porch or protiro embellished with sculpture, which is the work of the twelfth-century sculptor Nicholaus, who also executed and signed the entranceway at the abbey church of San Zeno, also in Verona, and Ferrara Cathedral. The portico is supported on the backs of two griffins, similar to those from the dismantled Porta dei Mesi at Ferrara. The lunette depicts the Virgin holding the Christ child in high relief, centered between two low relief scenes, the Annunciation to the Shepherds (left) and the Adoration of the Magi (right).

On the lintel in medallions are the three theological virtues, Faith, Charity and Hope. Ten figures of prophets are set in the doorposts and jambs; the four symbols of the Evangelists and the Hand of God are set above in the barrel vault of the first story of the porch. Set into the walls on either side of the portal are figures of Roland and Oliver, who as holy warriors, remind one of the constant need to provide protection to the church.

The Gothic windows in the façade provide evidence of the renovation that took place in the 14th century. The Baroque addition at the upper part of the facade is part of 17th-century additions. On the south side of the church is a second portal executed in the so-called Lombard or Como style. The main apse has retained its integrity and as such is an example of mid-12th-century architecture.

The bell tower, begun in the 16th century by Michele Sanmicheli and left unfinished, has two orders of columns with highly decorated capitals, bas-reliefs and traces of 14th-century frescoes. It contains nine bells in the scale of A. The tenor weight is 4,566 kg. The bells are rung with the tradition of Veronese bellringing art.

== Interior ==
The current appearance of the interior dates from the 15th-century renovations. It has a nave and two aisles divided by tall pilasters in red Verona marble, which support Gothic arcades. The first three chapels on each side are in the same style, and house mostly Renaissance artworks by Veronese artists. The nave ends with the main Chapel (Cappella Maggiore), also by Sanmicheli.

== Library ==
The Chapter Library of Verona Cathedral (Biblioteca Capitolare della Cattedrale di Verona) is claimed to be the world's oldest library in continuous function. Such is its importance that it has been dubbed the "Queen of ecclesiastical collections". Many ancient works of the Classical tradition have survived only because of the Chapter Library, including:

- the only surviving corpus of Catullus (Verona Codex, now lost);
- the epistulae ad Atticum, ad Quintum, ad Brutum by Cicero, rediscovered by Petrarch (exemplar now lost);
- the Institutes of Gaius, overwritten with works of Saint Jerome, rediscovered by Barthold Niebuhr;
- the fasti consulares of Verona, a list of Roman consuls from 439 to 494;
- the Laterculus Veronensis, a list of Roman dioceses;

It holds also important early Christian writings, such as:

- the Leonine Sacramentary, the oldest liturgical book of the Roman Rite;
- the Verona Palimpsest, containing early Church Orders;
- the Codex Veronensis, containing an old version of the Latin Psalter;
- the Codex Veronensis (R) is a diglot psalter in Greek and Latin

The following signature in a life of Saint Martin of Tours by a scribe is usually considered to mark the conventional dating of the founding of the Library: "my name is Ursicinus, Lector of the Church of Verona", confirming that he finished the work in the consulship of Agapitus (517).

== Gallery ==
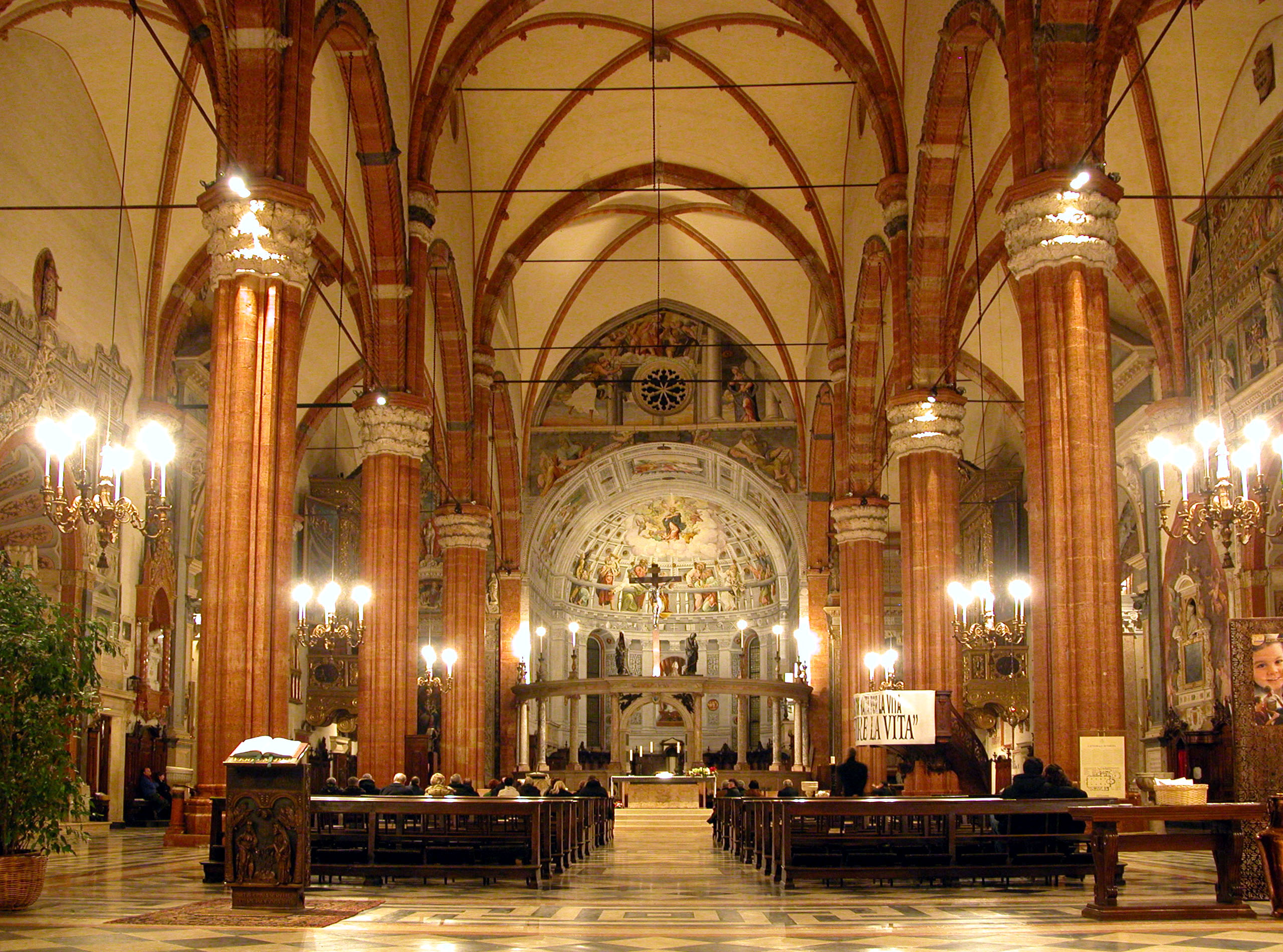
Central nave

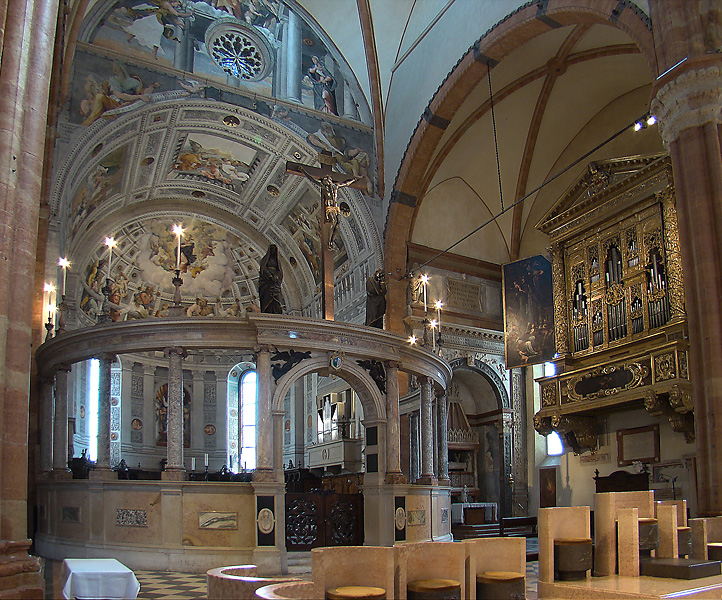
Main Chapel

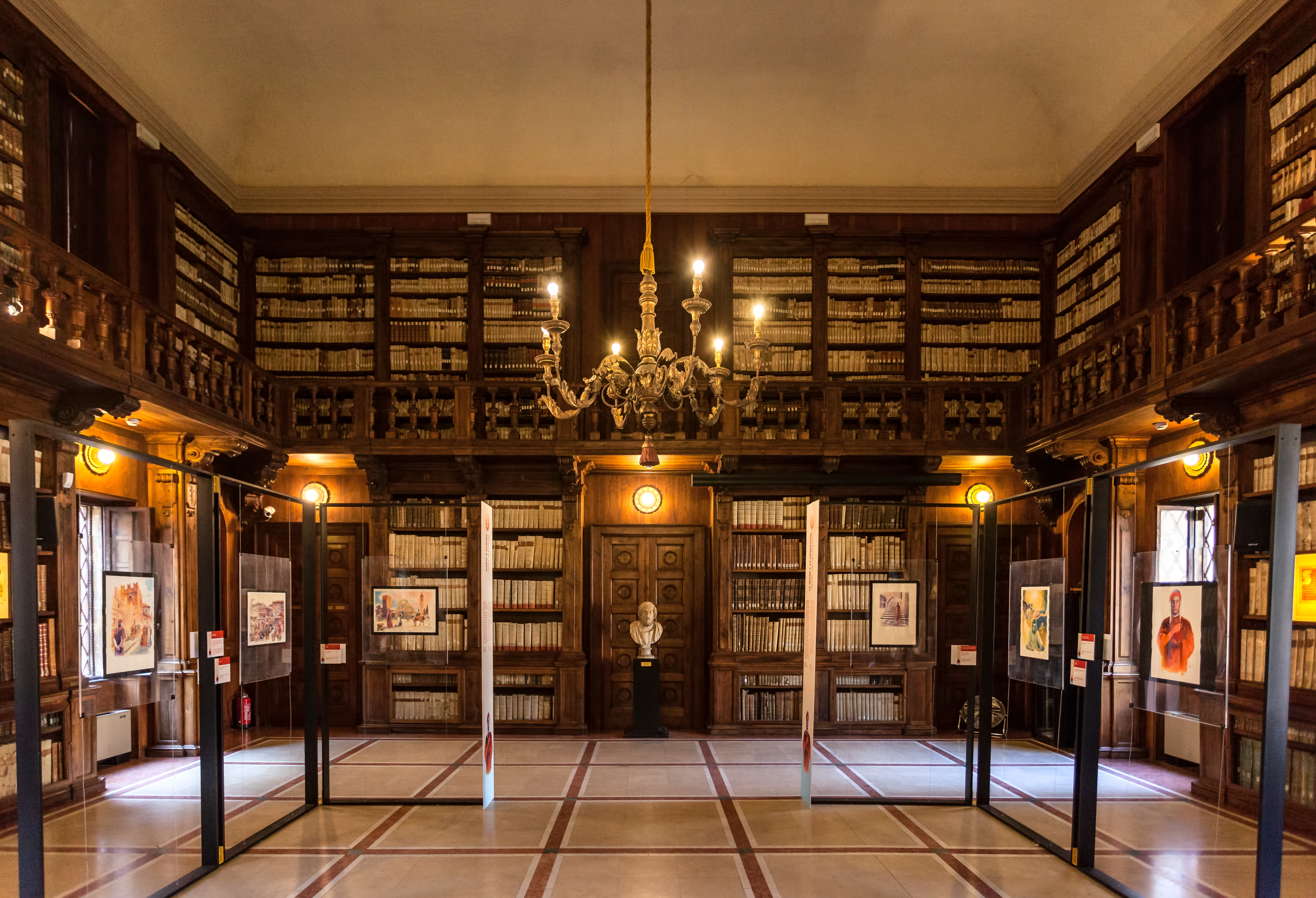
The Chapter Library

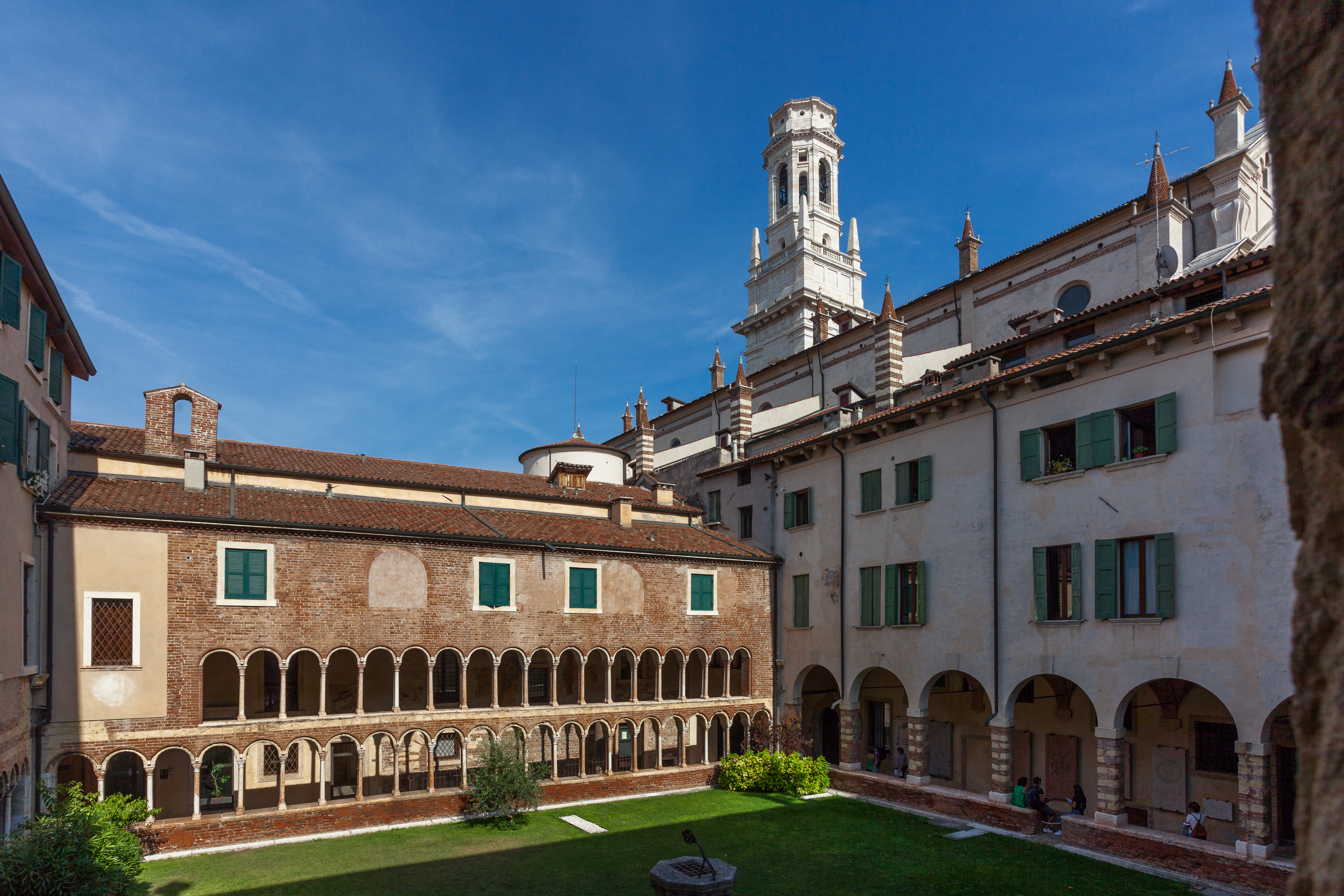
View from the cathedral cloister with Sanmicheli's bell tower

== See also ==
- Jacquet de Berchem
