= Psalm 96 =

Biblical psalm

- "Sing a new song unto the Lord"
- Royal psalm
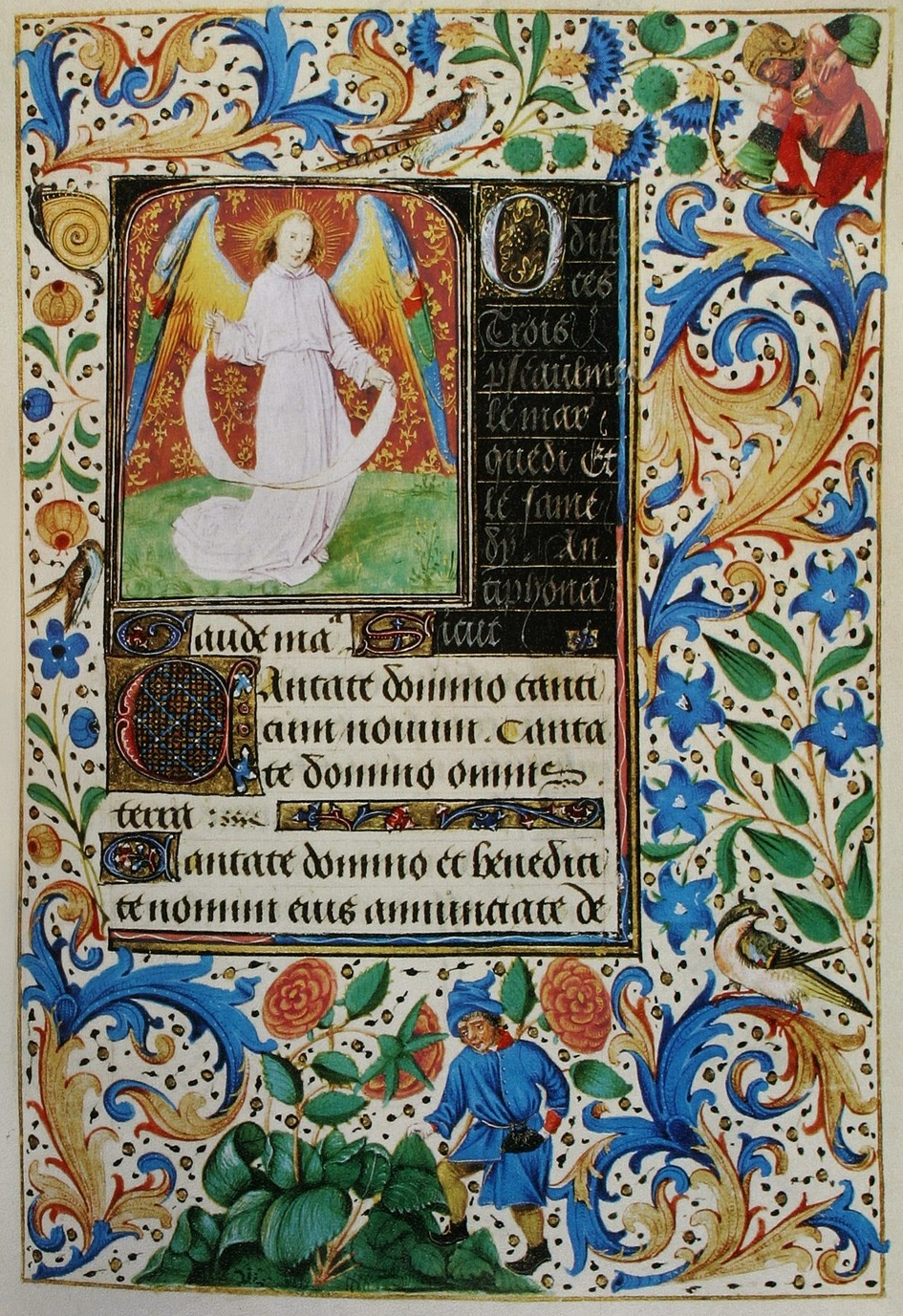
- Beginning of Cantate Domino in the Hours of Mary of Burgundy, 1477
- Other name: "Cantate Domino"; "Singet dem Herrn ein neues Lied"; "Cantate Domino canticum novum"
- Related: Psalm 98; Psalm 149
- Language: Hebrew (original)

Psalm 96
- ← Psalm 95 Psalm 97 →
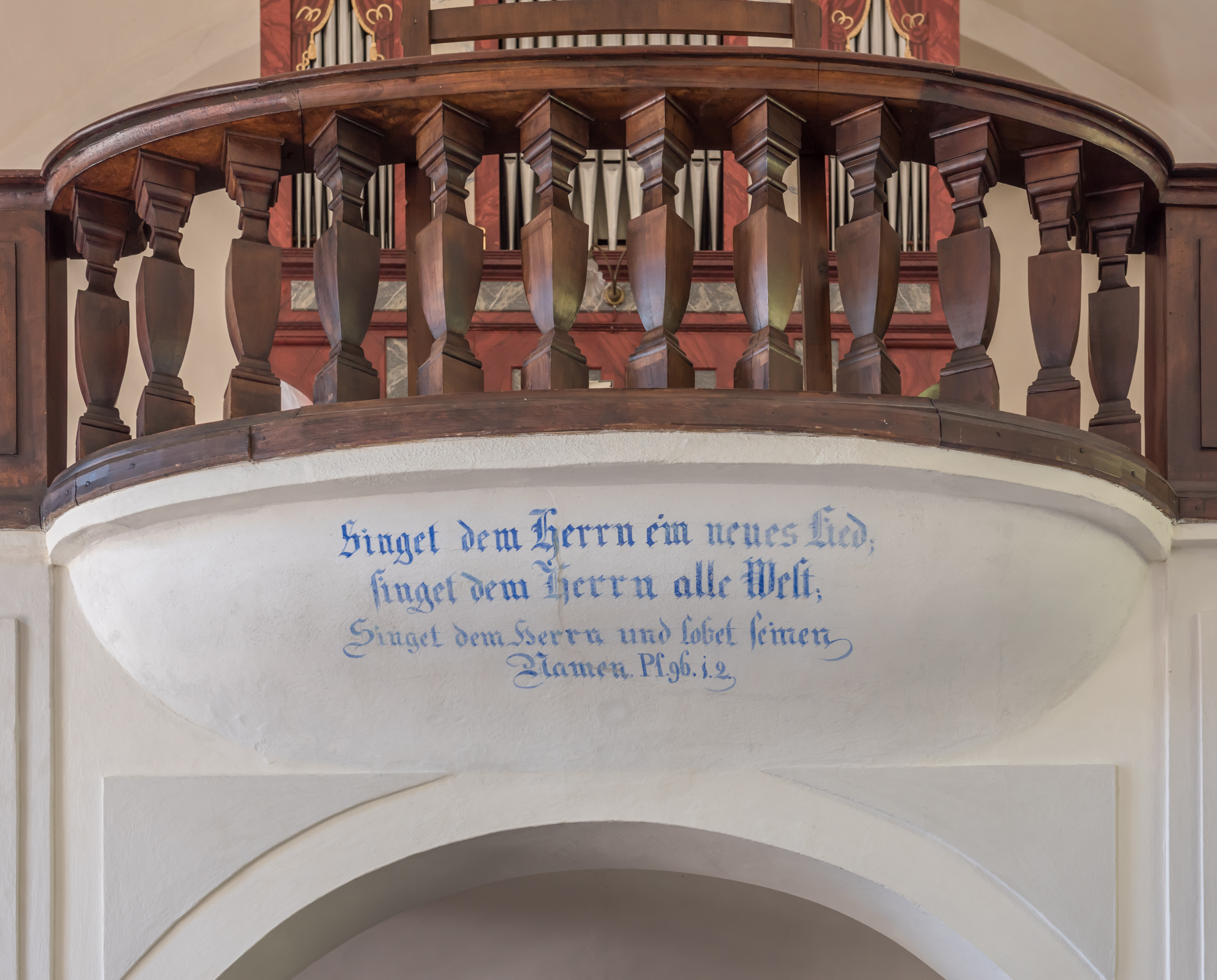
- Beginning of Psalm 96 in German at a church in Feldkirchen in Kärnten, Austria
- Book: Book of Psalms
- Hebrew Bible part: Ketuvim
- Order in the Hebrew part: 1
- Category: Sifrei Emet
- Christian Bible part: Old Testament
- Order in the Christian part: 19

Psalm 96 is the 96th psalm of the Book of Psalms, a hymn. The first verse of the psalm calls to praise in singing, in English in the Christian King James Version: "O sing a new song unto the Lord". Similar to Psalm 98 ("Cantate Domino") and Psalm 149, the psalm calls to praise God in music and dance, because he has chosen his people and helped them to victory. It is one of the royal psalms praising God as the king of his people.

In the slightly different numbering system used by the Greek Septuagint and the Latin Vulgate, this psalm is Psalm 95. In Latin, it is known as "Cantate Domino canticum novum".

The psalm forms a regular part of Jewish, Catholic, Lutheran, and Anglican liturgies. The Latin conclusion, "Laetentur caeli", is used during the Christmas night liturgy. The psalm or verses of it have been paraphrased to hymns, and it has often been set to music, notably by Handel in his Chandos Anthems, by Mendelssohn who quoted from it in a movement of his choral symphony Lobgesang, and Zoltán Gárdonyi as part of three motets.

Incipit: "O sing unto the LORD a new song: sing unto the LORD, all the earth." (KJV; in Hebrew שירו ליהוה שיר חדש שירו ליהוה כל־הארץ).

== Background and themes ==
According to Rabbi David Kimhi (Radak), this psalm was composed by David when he brought the Ark of the Covenant up to Jerusalem. On this day, David composed two songs—Hodu and "Sing to the Lord, the entire earth" (verse 2 of this psalm, which is also recorded in 1 Chronicles 16:23). As recounted in 1 Chronicles 16:7, David instructed Asaph and his brothers to sing these songs daily. Hodu was sung before the Ark every morning, and Psalm 96 was sung before the Ark every afternoon, until the time the Temple was constructed and the Ark was moved into it. However, Alexander Kirkpatrick associates the "newness" of the song with the deliverance of Israel from Babylonian captivity, inaugurating "a new stage in the nation’s history". He notes that the Septuagint's title for this psalm is "When the house was being built after the Captivity".

In Hebrew, this psalm is known as Shiru Lashem ("Sing to the Name"), and repeats the word "sing" three times. According to the Midrash Tehillim, these three instances allude to the three daily prayer services "when Israel sings praises to God". They are: Shacharit, the morning prayer, corresponding to "Sing a new song to the Lord" (verse 1); Mincha, the afternoon prayer, corresponding to "Sing to the Lord, all the earth" (verse 1); and Maariv, the evening prayer, corresponding to "Sing to the Lord, bless His Name" (verse 2).

In Baptist minister Charles Spurgeon's assessment, Psalm 96 is a "missionary hymn". He argues that it was specifically paired with Psalm 95, which described "Israel's hard-heartedness" toward God in the desert. Christian scholars assert that Israel employed that same hard-heartedness to reject Jesus as the Messiah, so now the Christians have the task of proselytizing the Gospel to the world. Matthew Henry interprets verses 10 to 13 in this psalm as instructions of what to say for those who preach the Gospel.

Biblical scholars note numerous thematic and structural similarities between Psalm 96 and Psalm 97, which are both "Kingship of YHWH" psalms.

== Textual witnesses ==
Some early manuscripts containing the text of this chapter in Hebrew are of the Masoretic Text tradition, which includes the Aleppo Codex (10th century), and Codex Leningradensis (1008).

The extant palimpsest Aq^{Taylor} includes a translation into Koine Greek by Aquila of Sinope in about 130 CE, containing verses 7–13.

== Uses ==
=== Judaism ===
Psalm 96 is the second of six psalms recited during the Kabbalat Shabbat (Welcoming the Shabbat) service in Ashkenazic, Hasidic and some Sephardic communities. These six psalms represent the six days of the week, with Psalm 96 corresponding to the second day of the week (Monday).

Verses 4 and 9 are part of Selichot.

Psalm 96 is recited to increase joy among family members.

=== Catholicism ===
The final three verses in Latin, "Laetentur caeli", comprise the offertory antiphon used in the Mass During the Night for the Nativity of the Lord.

=== Coptic Orthodox Church ===
In the Agpeya, the Coptic Church's book of hours, this psalm is prayed in the office of None.

== Musical settings ==
Calling to sing, Psalm 96 has been paraphrased in hymns, and often set to music. "Laetentur caeli" (vv. 11–13 of the Psalm) was set by Orlando di Lasso for four parts, and by Giovanni Bassano for double choir, among others. Handel set the psalm around 1712, and a movement of his Chandos Anthems in 1717 or 1718. German settings of the Baroque era:

- Heinrich Schütz set Psalm 96 in German, "Singet dem Herrn ein neues Lied", for choir as part of his composition of the Becker Psalter, SWV 194.
- Singet dem Herrn ein neues Lied, previously attributed to Georg Philipp Telemann as TWV 1:1748, is Melchior Hoffmann's 1708 setting of Psalm 96, as a church cantata for New Year's Day.
- Telemann's Singet dem Herrn ein neues Lied, TWV 7:30 is a setting of Psalm 96.

In the 19th century, Mendelssohn quoted from Psalm 96 in movement 10 of his choral symphony Lobgesang on biblical texts in 1810. Czech composer Antonín Dvořák quoted the psalm, combined with verses of Psalm 98, in the final movement of his Biblical Songs of 1894.

In the 20th century, Zoltán Gárdonyi set Psalm 96 as part of three motets in German, "Singet dem Herren", for mixed choir a cappella, along with a Finnish song and Psalm 23, published by Schott. James MacMillan wrote "A New Song" in 1997, with lyrics taken from this Psalm.

Hymns referring to the psalm include the 1901 "This Is My Father's World", and "Sing to the Lord a new made song". Music inspired by the psalm also includes a gospel blues by Blind Willie Johnson, "Church, I'm Fully Saved To-Day", based on the hymn "Fully Saved Today".

== Text ==
The following table shows the Hebrew text of the Psalm with vowels, alongside the Koine Greek text in the Septuagint and the English translation from the King James Version. Note that the meaning can slightly differ between these versions, as the Septuagint and the Masoretic Text come from different textual traditions. (Note: A 1917 translation directly from Hebrew to English by the Jewish Publication Society can be found here or here, and an 1844 translation directly from the Septuagint by L. C. L. Brenton can be found here. Both translations are in the public domain.) In the Septuagint, this psalm is numbered Psalm 95.

#	Hebrew	English	Greek
1	שִׁ֣ירוּ לַ֭יהֹוָה שִׁ֣יר חָדָ֑שׁ שִׁ֥ירוּ לַ֝יהֹוָ֗ה כׇּל־הָאָֽרֶץ׃	O sing unto the LORD a new song: sing unto the LORD, all the earth.	῞Οτε ὁ οἶκος ᾠκοδομεῖτο μετὰ τὴν αἰχμαλωσίαν· ᾠδὴ τῷ Δαυΐδ. - ΑΣΑΤΕ τῷ Κυρίῳ ᾆσμα καινόν, ᾄσατε τῷ Κυρίῳ πᾶσα ἡ γῆ·
2	שִׁ֣ירוּ לַ֭יהֹוָה בָּרְכ֣וּ שְׁמ֑וֹ בַּשְּׂר֥וּ מִיּֽוֹם־לְ֝י֗וֹם יְשׁוּעָתֽוֹ׃	Sing unto the LORD, bless his name; shew forth his salvation from day to day.	ᾄσατε τῷ Κυρίῳ· εὐλογήσατε τὸ ὄνομα αὐτοῦ, εὐαγγελίζεσθε ἡμέραν ἐξ ἡμέρας τὸ σωτήριον αὐτοῦ·
3	סַפְּר֣וּ בַגּוֹיִ֣ם כְּבוֹד֑וֹ בְּכׇל־הָ֝עַמִּ֗ים נִפְלְאוֹתָֽיו׃	Declare his glory among the heathen, his wonders among all people.	ἀναγγείλατε ἐν τοῖς ἔθνεσι τὴν δόξαν αὐτοῦ, ἐν πᾶσι τοῖς λαοῖς τὰ θαυμάσια αὐτοῦ.
4	כִּ֥י גָ֘ד֤וֹל יְהֹוָ֣ה וּמְהֻלָּ֣ל מְאֹ֑ד נוֹרָ֥א ה֝֗וּא עַל־כׇּל־אֱלֹהִֽים׃	For the LORD is great, and greatly to be praised: he is to be feared above all gods.	ὅτι μέγας Κύριος καὶ αἰνετὸς σφόδρα, φοβερός ἐστιν ὑπὲρ πάντας τοὺς θεούς·
5	כִּ֤י ׀ כׇּל־אֱלֹהֵ֣י הָעַמִּ֣ים אֱלִילִ֑ים וַ֝יהֹוָ֗ה שָׁמַ֥יִם עָשָֽׂה׃	For all the gods of the nations are idols: but the LORD made the heavens.	ὅτι πάντες οἱ θεοὶ τῶν ἐθνῶν δαιμόνια, ὁ δὲ Κύριος τοὺς οὐρανοὺς ἐποίησεν.
6	הוֹד־וְהָדָ֥ר לְפָנָ֑יו עֹ֥ז וְ֝תִפְאֶ֗רֶת בְּמִקְדָּשֽׁוֹ׃	Honour and majesty are before him: strength and beauty are in his sanctuary.	ἐξομολόγησις καὶ ὡραιότης ἐνώπιον αὐτοῦ. ἁγιωσύνη καὶ μεγαλοπρέπεια ἐν τῷ ἁγιάσματι αὐτοῦ.
7	הָב֣וּ לַ֭יהֹוָה מִשְׁפְּח֣וֹת עַמִּ֑ים הָב֥וּ לַ֝יהֹוָ֗ה כָּב֥וֹד וָעֹֽז׃	Give unto the LORD, O ye kindreds of the people, give unto the LORD glory and strength.	ἐνέγκατε τῷ Κυρίῳ, αἱ πατριαὶ τῶν ἐθνῶν, ἐνέγκατε τῷ Κυρίῳ δόξαν καὶ τιμήν·
8	הָב֣וּ לַ֭יהֹוָה כְּב֣וֹד שְׁמ֑וֹ שְׂאֽוּ־מִ֝נְחָ֗ה וּבֹ֥אוּ לְחַצְרוֹתָֽיו׃	Give unto the LORD the glory due unto his name: bring an offering, and come into his courts.	ἐνέγκατε τῷ Κυρίῳ δόξαν ὀνόματι αὐτοῦ, ἄρατε θυσίας καὶ εἰσπορεύεσθε εἰς τὰς αὐλὰς αὐτοῦ·
9	הִשְׁתַּחֲו֣וּ לַ֭יהֹוָה בְּהַדְרַת־קֹ֑דֶשׁ חִ֥ילוּ מִ֝פָּנָ֗יו כׇּל־הָאָֽרֶץ׃	O worship the LORD in the beauty of holiness: fear before him, all the earth.	προσκυνήσατε τῷ Κυρίῳ ἐν αὐλῇ ἁγίᾳ αὐτοῦ, σαλευθήτω ἀπὸ προσώπου αὐτοῦ πᾶσα ἡ γῆ.
10	אִמְר֤וּ בַגּוֹיִ֨ם ׀ יְ֘הֹוָ֤ה מָלָ֗ךְ אַף־תִּכּ֣וֹן תֵּ֭בֵל בַּל־תִּמּ֑וֹט יָדִ֥ין עַ֝מִּ֗ים בְּמֵישָׁרִֽים׃	Say among the heathen that the LORD reigneth: the world also shall be established that it shall not be moved: he shall judge the people righteously.	εἴπατε ἐν τοῖς ἔθνεσιν· ὁ Κύριος ἐβασίλευσε, καὶ γὰρ κατώρθωσε τὴν οἰκουμένην, ἥτις οὐ σαλευθήσεται, κρινεῖ λαοὺς ἐν εὐθύτητι.
11	יִשְׂמְח֣וּ הַ֭שָּׁמַיִם וְתָגֵ֣ל הָאָ֑רֶץ יִֽרְעַ֥ם הַ֝יָּ֗ם וּמְלֹאֽוֹ׃	Let the heavens rejoice, and let the earth be glad; let the sea roar, and the fulness thereof.	εὐφραινέσθωσαν οἱ οὐρανοὶ καὶ ἀγαλλιάσθω ἡ γῆ, σαλευθήτω ἡ θάλασσα καὶ τὸ πλήρωμα αὐτῆς·
12	יַעֲלֹ֣ז שָׂ֭דַי וְכׇל־אֲשֶׁר־בּ֑וֹ אָ֥ז יְ֝רַנְּנ֗וּ כׇּל־עֲצֵי־יָֽעַר׃	Let the field be joyful, and all that is therein: then shall all the trees of the wood rejoice	χαρήσεται τὰ πεδία καὶ πάντα τὰ ἐν αὐτοῖς· τότε ἀγαλλιάσονται πάντα τὰ ξύλα τοῦ δρυμοῦ
13	לִפְנֵ֤י יְהֹוָ֨ה ׀ כִּ֬י בָ֗א כִּ֥י בָא֮ לִשְׁפֹּ֢ט הָ֫אָ֥רֶץ יִשְׁפֹּֽט־תֵּבֵ֥ל בְּצֶ֑דֶק וְ֝עַמִּ֗ים בֶּאֱמוּנָתֽוֹ׃	Before the LORD: for he cometh, for he cometh to judge the earth: he shall judge the world with righteousness, and the people with his truth.	πρὸ προσώπου τοῦ Κυρίου, ὅτι ἔρχεται, ὅτι ἔρχεται κρῖναι τὴν γῆν. κρινεῖ τὴν οἰκουμένην ἐν δικαιοσύνῃ καὶ λαοὺς ἐν τῇ ἀληθείᾳ αὐτοῦ.

=== Verse 1 ===
Oh, sing to the Lord a new song!
Sing to the Lord, all the earth.

These words match those of the prophet Isaiah in Isaiah 42:10.

=== Verse 10 ===
Say among the nations, “The Lord reigns;
The world also is firmly established,
It shall not be moved;
He shall judge the peoples righteously.

Many Old Latin manuscripts read Dominus regnavit a ligno, that is "The Lord reigns from the wood" or "The Lord reigns from the tree". This reading does not appear in any Hebrew manuscripts, and its only appearance in a Greek Old Testament manuscript (as ἀπὸ τῷ ξύλω) is in a bilingual Greek-Latin manuscript, the Codex Veronensis. Neither does it appear in the parallel passage in 1 Chronicles 16:31. However, Justin Martyr references it in his Dialogue with Trypho (c. 160 AD), accusing the Jews of having omitted it. (Note: And from the ninety-fifth Psalm they have taken away this short saying of the words of David: 'From the wood.' For when the passage said, 'Tell ye among the nations, the Lord hath reigned from the wood,' they have left, 'Tell ye among the nations, the Lord hath reigned.' Now no one of your people has ever been said to have reigned as God and Lord among the nations, with the exception of Him only who was crucified, of whom also the Holy Spirit affirms in the same Psalm that He was raised again, and freed from [the grave], declaring that there is none like Him among the gods of the nations: for they are idols of demons. — Justin Martyr, Dialogue with Trypho LXXIII) Augustine quotes it in his commentary on the psalms (c. 430 AD), relating it to the crucifixion of Jesus, as do several other Church Fathers such as Tertullian, Cyprian and Lactantius. Jerome did not include it in the Vulgate because he could not find it in any Hebrew manuscripts. Despite this, it entered Christian hymnological and liturgical texts, such as the Psalterium Romanum, the hymn Vexilla regis prodeunt and the Coptic Agpeya, thus becoming familiar to many Christians.

Most Biblical critics believe that the words "from the wood" were added by an early Christian scribe, perhaps as a gloss that was then incorporated into the main text. However, Fr John Hunwicke hypothesized that, if the verse is original, it might have originally referred to the wooden Ark of the Covenant and its victory over the Philistine god Dagon.

== Sources ==
- Howard, David M. Jr. (1997). The Structure of Psalms 93–100. Eisenbrauns. ISBN 9781575060095.
- Nulman, Macy (1996). The Encyclopedia of Jewish Prayer: The Ashkenazic and Sephardic Rites. Jason Aronson. ISBN 1461631246.
- Rubin, Rav Yissachar Dov (2005). Talelei Oros: The Prayer Anthology. Feldheim Publishers. ISBN 9781583307618.
