= Psalm 99 =

99th psalm of the book of Psalms

- "The LORD reigneth"
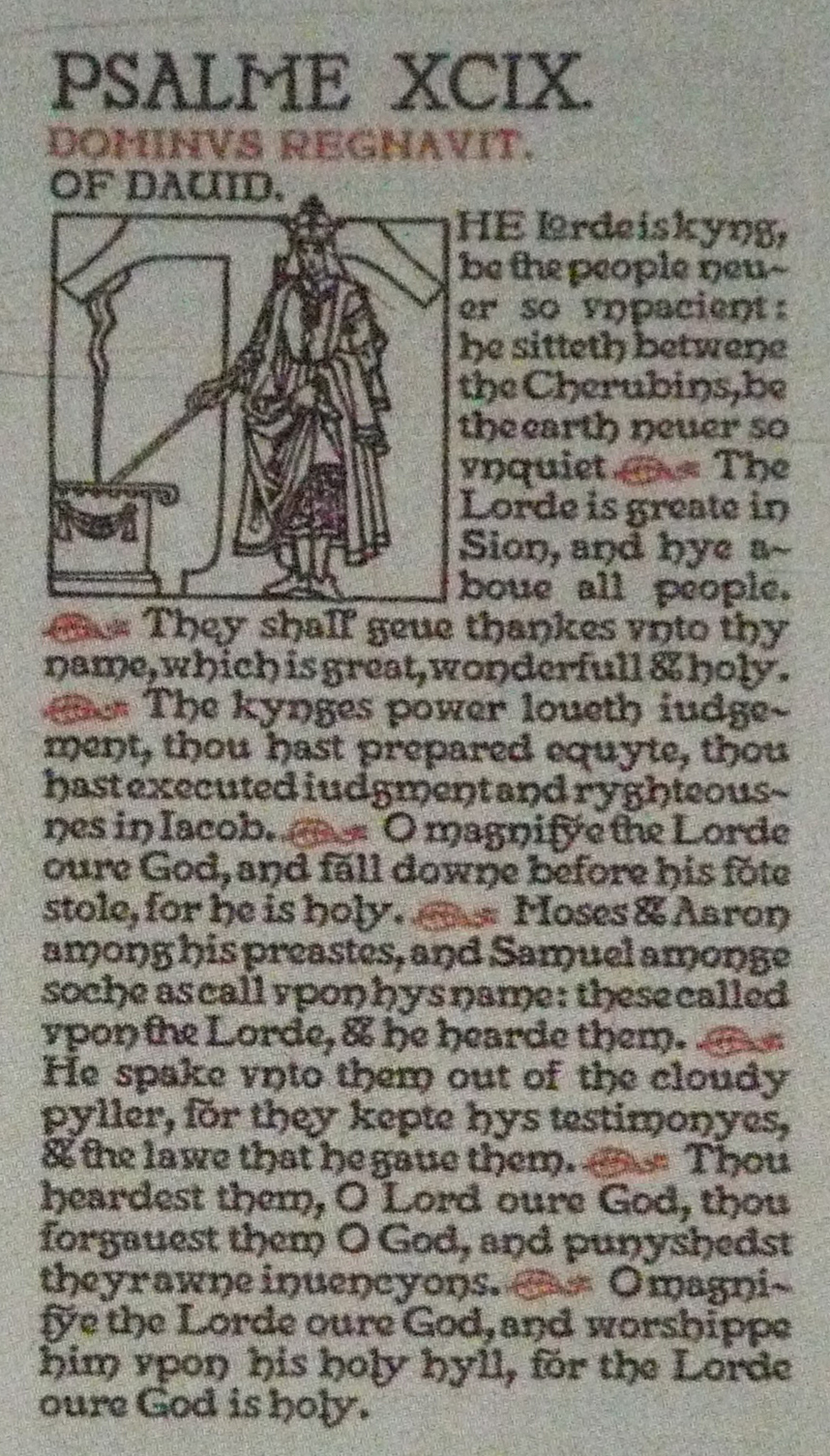
- Psalm 99 from 1902 Psalter
- Other name: Psalm 98; "Dominus regnavit"
- Language: Hebrew (original)

Psalm 99
- ← Psalm 98 Psalm 100 →
- Book: Book of Psalms
- Hebrew Bible part: Ketuvim
- Order in the Hebrew part: 1
- Category: Sifrei Emet
- Christian Bible part: Old Testament
- Order in the Christian part: 19

Psalm 99 is the 99th psalm of the Book of Psalms, beginning in English in the King James Version: "The LORD reigneth; let the people tremble". The Book of Psalms starts the third section of the Hebrew Bible, and, as such, is a book of the Christian Old Testament. In the slightly different numbering system in the Greek Septuagint version of the Bible, and in the Latin Vulgate, this psalm is Psalm 98, beginning "Dominus regnavit". It is the last of the set of additional Royal Psalms (Psalm 93–99), praising God as King of his people. There is no title in the Masoretic Text version, but the Septuagint provides a title: "A psalm of David".

The psalm forms a regular part of the Jewish liturgy, as well as the Catholic, Lutheran, Anglican and other Protestant liturgies. It has been set to music, including by Heinrich Schütz, and has inspired hymns and contemporary songs.

== Commentary ==
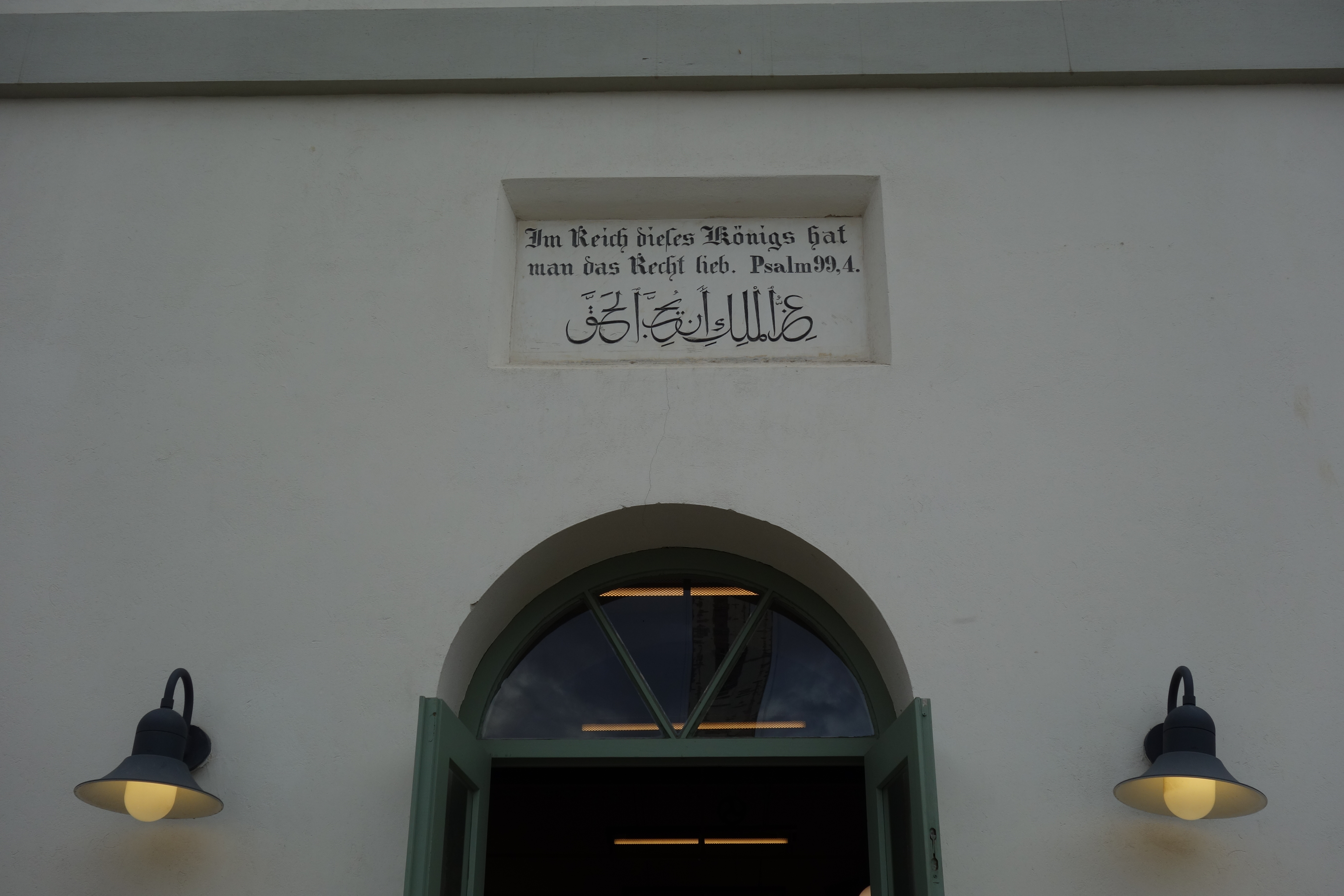
Psalm 99:4 on a building in Tel Aviv (2018), text in German and Arabic.

This psalm is the last of the "enthronement psalms" (Psalm 47, Psalm 93, and Psalms 96–99). It begins with the familiar statement "YHWH is king", followed by references to justice and righteousness (verse 4) and the covenant and its moral demands (verses 4 and 7), centering upon Zion (verse 2; "his holy mountain" in verse 9).

Some similarities with Deutero-Isaiah include the call for nations to tremble before God (verse 1). It is unique in naming Moses, Aaron, and Samuel, the "three great intercessors", and its feature of the threefold "Holy" (verses 3, 5, and 9), which repeated during the Kedushah in Judaism.

Alexander Kirkpatrick links this and other royal psalms to the restoration of Israel following the Israelites' return from the Babylonian captivity.

== Uses ==
=== Judaism ===
- The psalm is recited in its entirety as the fifth prayer of Kabbalat Shabbat in Ashkenazic, Hasidic, and some Sephardic communities' rites.
- Verses 5 and 9 are recited in succession during the early part of Pesukei Dezimra. These verses are also recited by the congregation when the Torah scroll is taken out of the ark.
- Verse 6 is found in the foundation of repentance recited by some on the eve of Rosh Hashanah.
- According to Siddur Avodas Yisrael, Psalm 99 should be read in addition to Psalm 92 (Mizmor Shir L'yom HaShabbat) on the Shabbat on which parashat Shemot is chanted.

=== Coptic Orthodox Church ===
In the Agpeya, the Coptic Orthodox Church's book of hours, Psalm 99 is prayed in the office of None.

== Musical settings ==
=== Hymns ===
Maria Luise Thurmair paraphrased Psalm 99 in the 1971 hymn in German "König ist der Herr".

=== Motets ===
Heinrich Schütz set a German metred version of Psalm 98 in the Becker Psalter, published in 1628, Der Herr ist König und residiert, SWV 197.

Raymond Wilding-White set the psalm for eight-part choir and organ.

=== Songs ===
The following songs are based on Psalm 99 or contain part of the psalm:

- "He sits enthroned" by Sons of Korah
- "Holy Is He" by Jason Silver
- "Issand on Siionis suur" (Lord is Great in Zion) by Rein Kalmus, was written for 2015 Estonian Christian Song Festival finale.

== Text ==
The following table shows the Hebrew text of the Psalm with vowels, alongside the Koine Greek text in the Septuagint and the English translation from the King James Version. Note that the meaning can slightly differ between these versions, as the Septuagint and the Masoretic Text come from different textual traditions. (Note: A 1917 translation directly from Hebrew to English by the Jewish Publication Society can be found here or here, and an 1844 translation directly from the Septuagint by L. C. L. Brenton can be found here. Both translations are in the public domain.) In the Septuagint, this psalm is numbered Psalm 98.

#	Hebrew	English	Greek
1	יְהֹוָ֣ה מָ֭לָךְ יִרְגְּז֣וּ עַמִּ֑ים יֹשֵׁ֥ב כְּ֝רוּבִ֗ים תָּנ֥וּט הָאָֽרֶץ׃	The LORD reigneth; let the people tremble: he sitteth between the cherubims; let the earth be moved.	Ψαλμὸς τῷ Δαυΐδ. - Ο ΚΥΡΙΟΣ ἐβασίλευσεν, ὀργιζέσθωσαν λαοί· ὁ καθήμενος ἐπὶ τῶν Χερουβίμ, σαλευθήτω ἡ γῆ.
2	יְ֭הֹוָה בְּצִיּ֣וֹן גָּד֑וֹל וְרָ֥ם ה֝֗וּא עַל־כׇּל־הָעַמִּֽים׃	The LORD is great in Zion; and he is high above all the people.	Κύριος ἐν Σιὼν μέγας καὶ ὑψηλός ἐστιν ἐπὶ πάντας τοὺς λαούς.
3	יוֹד֣וּ שִׁ֭מְךָ גָּד֥וֹל וְנוֹרָ֗א קָד֥וֹשׁ הֽוּא׃	Let them praise thy great and terrible name; for it is holy.	ἐξομολογησάσθωσαν τῷ ὀνόματί σου τῷ μεγάλῳ, ὅτι φοβερὸν καὶ ἅγιόν ἐστι.
4	וְעֹ֥ז מֶלֶךְ֮ מִשְׁפָּ֢ט אָ֫הֵ֥ב אַ֭תָּה כּוֹנַ֣נְתָּ מֵישָׁרִ֑ים מִשְׁפָּ֥ט וּ֝צְדָקָ֗ה בְּיַעֲקֹ֤ב ׀ אַתָּ֬ה עָשִֽׂיתָ׃	The king's strength also loveth judgment; thou dost establish equity, thou executest judgment and righteousness in Jacob.	καὶ τιμὴ βασιλέως κρίσιν ἀγαπᾷ· σὺ ἡτοίμασας εὐθύτητας, κρίσιν καὶ δικαιοσύνην ἐν ᾿Ιακὼβ σὺ ἐποίησας.
5	רוֹמְמ֡וּ יְ֘הֹוָ֤ה אֱלֹהֵ֗ינוּ וְֽ֭הִשְׁתַּחֲווּ לַהֲדֹ֥ם רַגְלָ֗יו קָד֥וֹשׁ הֽוּא׃	Exalt ye the LORD our God, and worship at his footstool; for he is holy.	ὑψοῦτε Κύριον τὸν Θεὸν ἡμῶν καὶ προσκυνεῖτε τῷ ὑποποδίῳ τῶν ποδῶν αὐτοῦ, ὅτι ἅγιός ἐστι.
6	מֹ֘שֶׁ֤ה וְאַֽהֲרֹ֨ן ׀ בְּֽכֹהֲנָ֗יו וּ֭שְׁמוּאֵל בְּקֹרְאֵ֣י שְׁמ֑וֹ קֹרִ֥אים אֶל־יְ֝הֹוָ֗ה וְה֣וּא יַעֲנֵֽם׃	Moses and Aaron among his priests, and Samuel among them that call upon his name; they called upon the LORD, and he answered them.	Μωυσῆς καὶ ᾿Ααρὼν ἐν τοῖς ἱερεῦσιν αὐτοῦ, καὶ Σαμουὴλ ἐν τοῖς ἐπικαλουμένοις τὸ ὄνομα αὐτοῦ· ἐπεκαλοῦντο τὸν Κύριον, καὶ αὐτὸς εἰσήκουσεν αὐτῶν,
7	בְּעַמּ֣וּד עָ֭נָן יְדַבֵּ֣ר אֲלֵיהֶ֑ם שָׁמְר֥וּ עֵ֝דֹתָ֗יו וְחֹ֣ק נָֽתַן־לָֽמוֹ׃	He spake unto them in the cloudy pillar: they kept his testimonies, and the ordinance that he gave them.	ἐν στύλῳ νεφέλης ἐλάλει πρὸς αὐτούς· ὅτι ἐφύλασσον τὰ μαρτύρια αὐτοῦ καὶ τὰ προστάγματα αὐτοῦ, ἃ ἔδωκεν αὐτοῖς.
8	יְהֹוָ֣ה אֱלֹהֵינוּ֮ אַתָּ֢ה עֲנִ֫יתָ֥ם אֵ֣ל נֹ֭שֵׂא הָיִ֣יתָ לָהֶ֑ם וְ֝נֹקֵ֗ם עַל־עֲלִילוֹתָֽם׃	Thou answeredst them, O LORD our God: thou wast a God that forgavest them, though thou tookest vengeance of their inventions.	Κύριε ὁ Θεὸς ἡμῶν, σὺ ἐπήκουσε αὐτῶν· ὁ Θεός, σὺ εὐίλατος ἐγίνου αὐτοῖς καὶ ἐκδικῶν ἐπὶ πάντα τὰ ἐπιτηδεύματα αὐτῶν.
9	רוֹמְמ֡וּ יְ֘הֹוָ֤ה אֱלֹהֵ֗ינוּ וְֽ֭הִשְׁתַּחֲווּ לְהַ֣ר קׇדְשׁ֑וֹ כִּי־קָ֝ד֗וֹשׁ יְהֹוָ֥ה אֱלֹהֵֽינוּ׃	Exalt the LORD our God, and worship at his holy hill; for the LORD our God is holy.	ὑψοῦτε Κύριον τὸν Θεὸν ἡμῶν καὶ προσκυνεῖτε εἰς ὄρος ἅγιον αὐτοῦ, ὅτι ἅγιος Κύριος ὁ Θεὸς ἡμῶν.

=== Verse 5 ===
Exalt the Lord our God,
And worship at His footstool —
He is holy.

"God's footstool" may allude to 'the ark', 'the temple, Jerusalem', or 'the whole earth'. Alexander Kirkpatrick notes that "as there was no Ark in the Second Temple, the Temple itself must be meant here, or possibly Zion".

=== Verse 6 ===
Moses and Aaron were among his priests,
Samuel also was among those who called on his name.

They cried to the Lord, and he answered them.

English church commentator John Trapp noted that Moses, if not a priest as such, was "a continual intercessor for the people", and Aben-Ezra and Philo both include the term "priest" in their praise of Moses.
