= Psalm 93 =

Biblical psalm

- "The LORD reigneth, he is clothed with majesty"
- Royal psalm
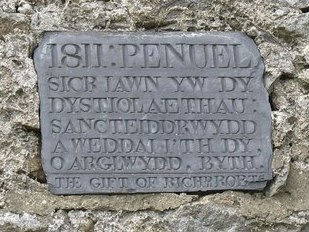
- Verse 5 engraved in Welsh at Peniel Chapel, Tremadog, Gwynedd, in 1811
- Other name: Psalm 92 (Vulgate); Dominus regnavit, decorem indutus est
- Language: Hebrew (original)

Psalm 93
- ← Psalm 92 Psalm 94 →
- Book: Book of Psalms
- Hebrew Bible part: Ketuvim
- Order in the Hebrew part: 1
- Category: Sifrei Emet
- Christian Bible part: Old Testament
- Order in the Christian part: 19

Psalm 93 is the 93rd psalm of the Book of Psalms, beginning in English in the King James Version: "The LORD reigneth, he is clothed with majesty". The Latin wording is Dominus regnavit, decorem indutus est. The Book of Psalms is part of the Hebrew Bible and the Christian Old Testament. In the slightly different numbering system of the Greek Septuagint and Latin Vulgate versions of the Bible, this psalm is Psalm 92. It is the first of a series of psalms (Psalms 93–99) which are called royal psalms as they praise God as King.

In the Masoretic text and in English versions it has no title or author, but the Septuagint and Vulgate entitle it "On the day before the Sabbath, when the earth was founded: A Psalm of thanksgiving to (or for) David".

The psalm forms a regular part of Jewish, Catholic, Lutheran, Anglican and other Protestant worship. It has often been set to music. The Latin version was set by Hildegard of Bingen, Josquin des Prez, Jean-Joseph de Mondonville and Jules Van Nuffel, among others. Heinrich Schütz and Ferdinand Hiller composed settings in German. Handel used verses from the psalm for his Chandos Anthem No. 4 for use in the Anglican Church.

== Background and themes ==
The two main themes of Psalm 93 are God's kingship and a connection with Friday, the sixth day of the week (counting from Sunday). The Zohar notes that in Hebrew, this psalm contains 45 words, which is the gematria (numerical value) of the word adam (Hebrew: אדם, "man"). Adam was created on the sixth day of Creation and went on to proclaim God as King. Psalm 93 was also designated as the Song of the Day for Friday, to be sung by the Levites in the Temple in Jerusalem: this tradition continues today in the psalm's inclusion in the regular Friday morning prayer service in Judaism. According to Rabbi Yaakov Emden, the connection with the sixth day is reinforced by the psalm's description of God "in His full grandeur and power as He was when He completed the six days of Creation", and the reference to donning grandeur further alludes to the way Jews dress up in their nicest garments on Friday to greet the approaching Shabbat. Psalm 93 also hints to the future Messianic Age, when the entire world will acknowledge God as King.

Charles Spurgeon notes that the Septuagint connects Psalm 93 with the sixth day of the week by titling it "On the day before the Sabbath, when the earth was founded: A Psalm of thanksgiving to (or for) David". This wording was similarly adopted by the Vulgate: Psalmus ipsi David, quarta sabbati. Spurgeon adds that the theme of God's sovereignty is clear from the first line of the psalm. Matthew Henry notes how the psalm reinforces God's kingship by comparing him to earthly kings, stating:

Concerning God's kingdom glorious things are here spoken.
I. Have other kings their royal robes? So has he (v. 1).
II. Have they their thrones? So has he (v. 2).
III. Have they their enemies whom they subdue and triumph over? So has he (v. 3, v. 4).
IV. Is it their honour to be faithful and holy? So it is his (v. 5).

== Textual witnesses ==
Some early manuscripts containing the text of this chapter in Hebrew are of the Masoretic Text tradition, which includes the Aleppo Codex (10th century), and Codex Leningradensis (1008).

The extant palimpsest Aq^{Taylor} includes a translation into Koine Greek by Aquila of Sinope in c. 130 CE, containing verse 3.

== Uses ==
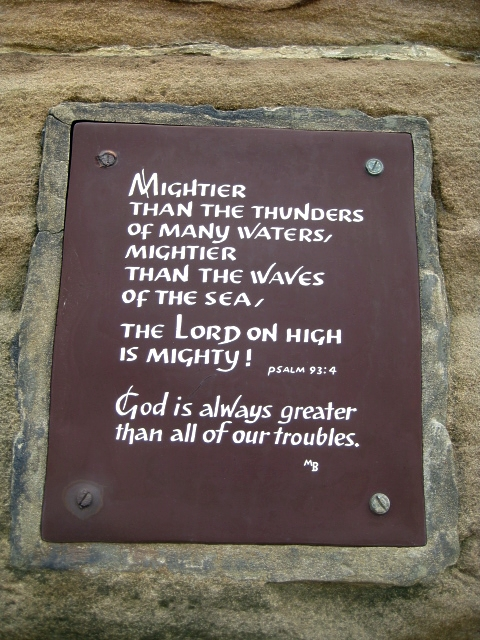
A plaque with Psalm 93:4 is affixed to the south side of the west pier lightouse, Whitby, United Kingdom.

=== Judaism ===
Psalm 93 is the Song of the Day for Friday, recited in that day's morning prayer service. Some communities also recite this psalm as the ma'amad (special daily prayer) for Friday. Additionally, Psalm 93 is the final psalm said during the Kabbalat Shabbat service on Friday night, acting as a summation of the preceding seven psalms. It is also recited in its entirety during Pesukei dezimra on Shabbat, Yom Tov, and - in many communities - on Hoshana Rabbah. In most Sephardic communities, it is recited in mincha on Friday as well.

Verse 1 (in the Hebrew) is quoted in Mishnah Tamid 7:4. Verse 1 is also one of the ten verses in the section of Malkhuyot (Sovereignty) which is recited in the Mussaf Amidah on Rosh Hashanah.

Verse 4 (in the Hebrew) is said by the seas in Perek Shirah.

Psalm 93 is said as a prayer for success in a court case.

=== Eastern Orthodox Church ===
In the Eastern Orthodox Church, Psalm 92 (Psalm 93 in the Masoretic Text) is part of the thirteenth Kathisma division of the Psalter, read at Matins on Thursday mornings, as well as on Tuesdays and Fridays during Lent, at the First Hour and Matins, respectively. It is also read at the Great Hours on the eve of Epiphany, and at the Inter-Hour of the First Hour.

Verses from Psalm 92/93 are sung as the Second Antiphon at the Divine Liturgy on ordinary (non-festal) weekdays.

This Psalm is also read during the rite of the consecration of a church, during the vesting of the altar.

=== Coptic Orthodox Church ===
In the Agpeya, the Coptic Church's book of hours, this psalm is prayed in the office of Sext.

== Musical settings ==
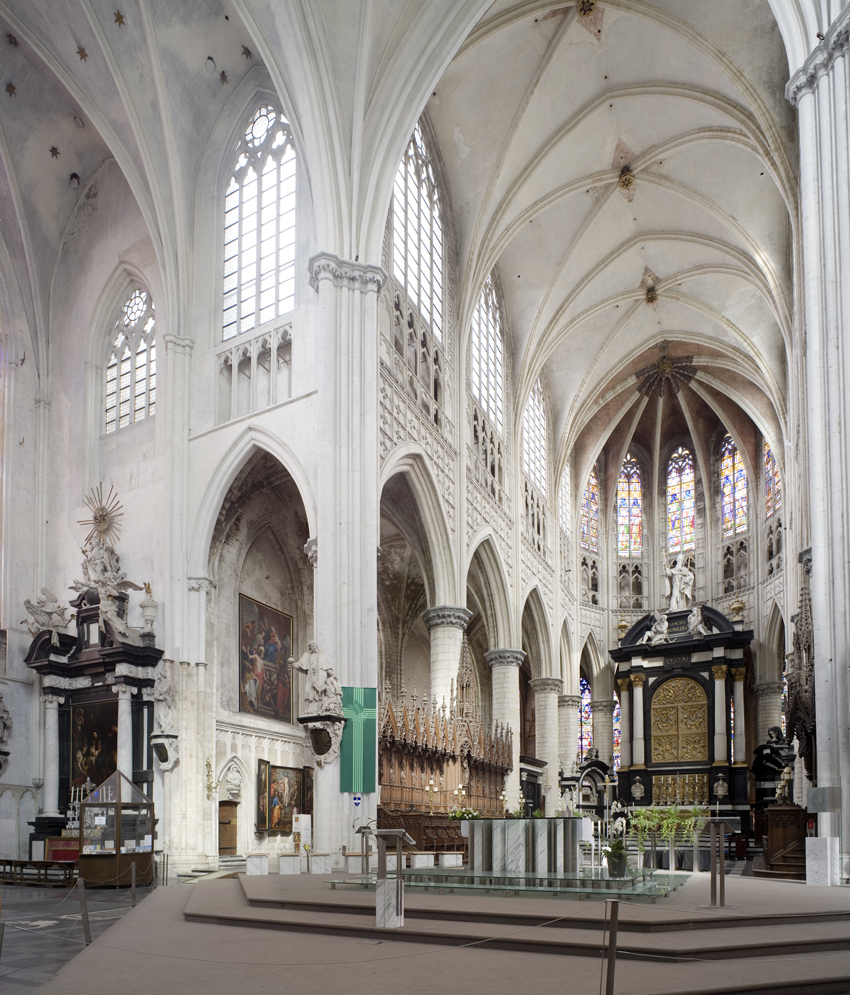
Interior of St. Rumbold's Cathedral in Mechelen, Belgium, where Van Nuffel worked

=== Catholic ===
"Dominus regnavit" is Psalm 92 in the Vulgate; it was set by Hildegard of Bingen. A motet setting it for choir a cappella, with an added doxology, is attributed to Josquin des Prez.

Jean-Joseph de Mondonville set the psalm in 1734 as a Grand Motet in several movements, Dominus regnavit decorum. François Giroust set a Grand motet in 1764. Jules Van Nuffel, founder and conductor of the choir at St. Rumbold's Cathedral in Mechelen, Belgium, set the psalm in Latin, Dominus regnavit, for four-to-six-part choir and organ, Op. 49, in 1935.

=== Protestant ===
The Lutheran Baroque composer Heinrich Schütz set Psalm 93 in German, "Der Herr ist König herrlich schön" (The Lord is King, heavenly beautiful), for choir as part of his composition of the Becker Psalter, SWV 191. Handel used verses from the psalm for his Chandos Anthem No. 4 in 1717 or 1718, intended for use in the Anglican Church.

Ferdinand Hiller wrote a setting in German for men's choir and orchestra, published in Leipzig, 1864.

In the Free Church of Scotland's 2003 psalter, Sing Psalms, Psalm 93 starts "The Lord is king; his throne endures." Set to the common meter, the recommended melodies are St. Magnus, Southwark and Stroudwater.

=== Jewish ===
Shlomo Carlebach composed a melody for the last two verses in the Hebrew, to be sung during Kabbalat Shabbat. Charles Salaman arranged a setting based on Mendelssohn's Elijah that is sung in the Friday night shabbat service in London's Spanish and Portuguese synagogue.

== Text ==
The following table shows the Hebrew text of the Psalm with vowels, alongside the Koine Greek text in the Septuagint and the English translation from the King James Version. Note that the meaning can slightly differ between these versions, as the Septuagint and the Masoretic Text come from different textual traditions. (Note: A 1917 translation directly from Hebrew to English by the Jewish Publication Society can be found here or here, and an 1844 translation directly from the Septuagint by L. C. L. Brenton can be found here. Both translations are in the public domain.) In the Septuagint, this psalm is numbered Psalm 92.

| # | Hebrew | English | Greek |
|---|---|---|---|
| 1 | יְהֹוָ֣ה מָלָךְ֮ גֵּא֢וּת לָ֫בֵ֥שׁ לָבֵ֣שׁ יְ֭הֹוָה עֹ֣ז הִתְאַזָּ֑ר אַף־תִּכּ֥וֹן תֵּ֝בֵ֗ל בַּל־תִּמּֽוֹט׃ | The LORD reigneth, he is clothed with majesty; the LORD is clothed with strength, wherewith he hath girded himself: the world also is established, that it cannot be moved. | Εἰς τὴν ἡμέραν τοῦ προσαββάτου, ὅτε κατῴκισται ἡ γῆ· αἶνος ᾠδῆς τῷ Δαυΐδ. - Ο Κύριος ἐβασίλευσεν, εὐπρέπειαν ἐνεδύσατο, ἐνεδύσατο Κύριος δύναμιν καὶ περιεζώσατο· καὶ γὰρ ἐστερέωσε τὴν οἰκουμένην, ἥτις οὐ σαλευθήσεται. |
| 2 | נָכ֣וֹן כִּסְאֲךָ֣ מֵאָ֑ז מֵעוֹלָ֣ם אָֽתָּה׃ | Thy throne is established of old: thou art from everlasting. | ἕτοιμος ὁ θρόνος σου ἀπὸ τότε, ἀπὸ τοῦ αἰῶνος σὺ εἶ. |
| 3 | נָשְׂא֤וּ נְהָר֨וֹת ׀ יְֽהֹוָ֗ה נָשְׂא֣וּ נְהָר֣וֹת קוֹלָ֑ם יִשְׂא֖וּ נְהָר֣וֹת דׇּכְיָֽם׃ | The floods have lifted up, O LORD, the floods have lifted up their voice; the floods lift up their waves. | ἐπῆραν οἱ ποταμοί, Κύριε, ἐπῆραν οἱ ποταμοὶ φωνὰς αὐτῶν· ἀροῦσιν οἱ ποταμοὶ ἐπιτρίψεις αὐτῶν. |
| 4 | מִקֹּל֨וֹת ׀ מַ֤יִם רַבִּ֗ים אַדִּירִ֣ים מִשְׁבְּרֵי־יָ֑ם אַדִּ֖יר בַּמָּר֣וֹם יְהֹוָֽה׃ | The LORD on high is mightier than the noise of many waters, yea, than the mighty waves of the sea. | ἀπὸ φωνῶν ὑδάτων πολλῶν θαυμαστοὶ οἱ μετεωρισμοὶ τῆς θαλάσσης, θαυμαστὸς ἐν ὑψηλοῖς ὁ Κύριος. |
| 5 | עֵֽדֹתֶ֨יךָ ׀ נֶאֶמְנ֬וּ מְאֹ֗ד לְבֵיתְךָ֥ נַאֲוָה־קֹ֑דֶשׁ יְ֝הֹוָ֗ה לְאֹ֣רֶךְ יָמִֽים׃ | Thy testimonies are very sure: holiness becometh thine house, O LORD, for ever. | τὰ μαρτύριά σου ἐπιστώθησαν σφόδρα· τῷ οἴκῳ σου πρέπει ἁγίασμα, Κύριε, εἰς μακρότητα ἡμερῶν. |

== Cited sources ==
- Birnbaum, Rabbi Mayer (ed.). Pathway to Prayer: Yomim Noraim, Sefardi. Feldheim Publishers. ISBN 978-1583302880.
- Nelson, Thomas (2018). NKJV Study Bible. Thomas Nelson. ISBN 978-0785220732.
- Nulman, Macy (1996). The Encyclopedia of Jewish Prayer: The Ashkenazic and Sephardic Rites. Jason Aronson. ISBN 1461631246.
- Scherman, Rabbi Nosson (2005). The Complete Artscroll Siddur (3rd ed.). Mesorah Publications, Ltd. ISBN 978-0899066509.
- Scherman, Rabbi Nosson (1989). The Complete ArtScroll Machzor – Rosh Hashanah (1st ed.). Mesorah Publications, Ltd. ISBN 0-89906-676-3.
