= Psalm 21 =

Biblical psalm

- "The king shall joy in thy strength"
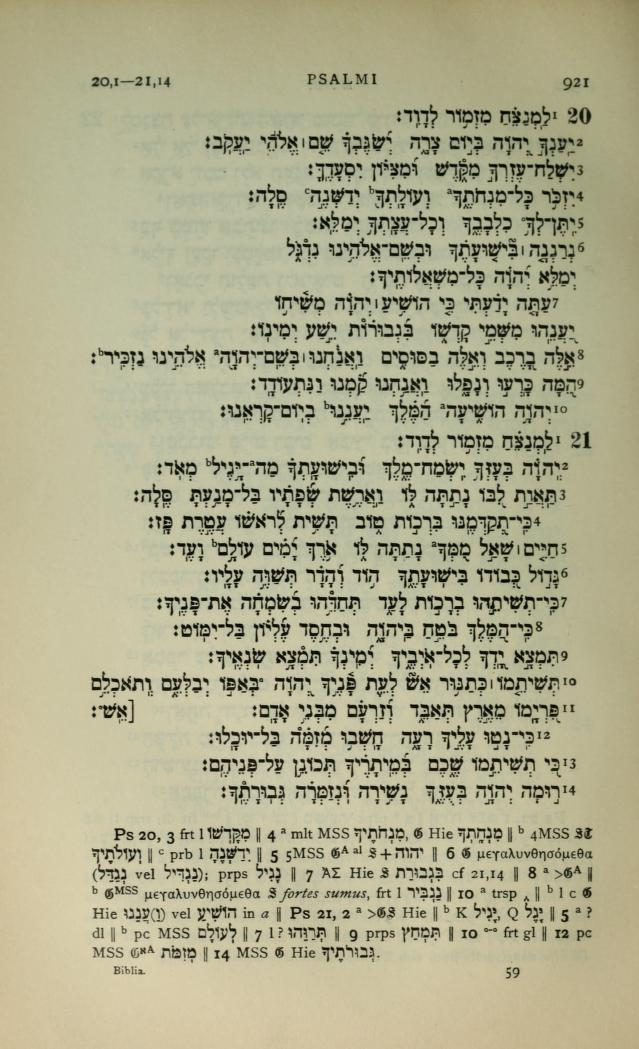
- Psalms 20-21 in Biblia Hebraica Kittel (1909)
- Other name: "Domine in virtute tua laetabitur"
- Text: attributed to David
- Language: Hebrew (original)

Psalm 21
- ← Psalm 20 Psalm 22 →
- Book: Book of Psalms
- Hebrew Bible part: Ketuvim
- Order in the Hebrew part: 1
- Category: Sifrei Emet
- Christian Bible part: Old Testament
- Order in the Christian part: 19

Psalm 21 is the 21st psalm of the Book of Psalms, beginning in English in the King James Version: "The king shall joy in thy strength". The Book of Psalms is part of the third section of the Hebrew Bible, and a book of the Christian Old Testament. In the slightly different numbering system used in the Greek Septuagint and Latin Vulgate translations of the Bible, this psalm is Psalm 20. In Latin, it is known by the incipit, "Domine in virtute tua". The psalm is attributed to David.

Psalm 21 is used in both Jewish and Christian liturgies. It has often been set to music, especially for royal functions, such as Handel's Coronation anthems.

== Themes ==
This royal psalm and the previous one are closely related: they are both liturgical psalms; in both, the king is the prominent figure. Psalm 21 is characterised as a psalm of thanksgiving. It focuses on the imagery of a king; the king is often credited with being an example of the moral state of a kingdom in the Old Testament.

Commentary by the theologian John Calvin relates this psalm to the belief that God had appointed a succession of rulers on Earth, starting with David and eventually leading to the messiah, who Calvin identified as Jesus. Calvin also implies that this psalm does not refer to a specific king, but to all kings. The Jerusalem Bible identifies both messianic and eschatological themes, and commends the application of this psalm to the idea of "Christ the King". Verse 9, the time of thine anger in the King James Version, the day that you appear in the Jerusalem Bible, and the reference to a blazing furnace "suggest a more ... eschatological perspective".

Commentator Cyril Rodd notes that "the situation to which [the psalm] refers is not clear". He identifies four possible occasions for its composition or use:

- before a battle
- after a victory
- at the king's coronation
- at an annual celebration of the king's accession.

The New Revised Standard Version specifies that it is a psalm of "thanksgiving for victory".

== Text ==
The following table shows the Hebrew text of the Psalm with vowels, alongside the Koine Greek text in the Septuagint and the English translation from the King James Version. Note that the meaning can slightly differ between these versions, as the Septuagint and the Masoretic Text come from different textual traditions. (Note: A 1917 translation directly from Hebrew to English by the Jewish Publication Society can be found here or here, and an 1844 translation directly from the Septuagint by L. C. L. Brenton can be found here. Both translations are in the public domain.) In the Septuagint, this psalm is numbered Psalm 20.

| # | Hebrew | English | Greek |
|---|---|---|---|
| (Note: In the Jewish verse numbering, the ascription of this psalm is verse 1, and the rest of the psalm begins from verse 2. However, the Christian verse numbering does not count the ascription as a separate verse.) | לַמְנַצֵּ֗חַ מִזְמ֥וֹר לְדָוִֽד׃ | (To the chief Musician, A Psalm of David.) | Εἰς τὸ τέλος· ψαλμὸς τῷ Δαυΐδ. - |
| 1 | יְֽהֹוָ֗ה בְּעׇזְּךָ֥ יִשְׂמַח־מֶ֑לֶךְ וּ֝בִישׁ֥וּעָתְךָ֗ מַה־[יָּ֥גֶל] (יגיל) מְאֹֽד׃ | The king shall joy in thy strength, O LORD; and in thy salvation how greatly shall he rejoice! | ΚΥΡΙΕ, ἐν τῇ δυνάμει σου εὐφρανθήσεται ὁ βασιλεὺς καὶ ἐπὶ τῷ σωτηρίῳ σου ἀγαλλιάσεται σφόδρα. |
| 2 | תַּאֲוַ֣ת לִ֭בּוֹ נָתַ֣תָּה לּ֑וֹ וַאֲרֶ֥שֶׁת שְׂ֝פָתָ֗יו בַּל־מָנַ֥עְתָּ סֶּֽלָה׃ | Thou hast given him his heart's desire, and hast not withholden the request of his lips. Selah. | τὴν ἐπιθυμίαν τῆς καρδίας αὐτοῦ ἔδωκας αὐτῷ καὶ τὴν θέλησιν τῶν χειλέων αὐτοῦ οὐκ ἐστέρησας αὐτόν. (διάψαλμα). |
| 3 | כִּֽי־תְ֭קַדְּמֶנּוּ בִּרְכ֣וֹת ט֑וֹב תָּשִׁ֥ית לְ֝רֹאשׁ֗וֹ עֲטֶ֣רֶת פָּֽז׃ | For thou preventest him with the blessings of goodness: thou settest a crown of pure gold on his head. | ὅτι προέφθασας αὐτὸν ἐν εὐλογίαις χρηστότητος, ἔθηκας ἐπὶ τὴν κεφαλὴν αὐτοῦ στέφανον ἐκ λίθου τιμίου. |
| 4 | חַיִּ֤ים ׀ שָׁאַ֣ל מִ֭מְּךָ נָתַ֣תָּה לּ֑וֹ אֹ֥רֶךְ יָ֝מִ֗ים עוֹלָ֥ם וָעֶֽד׃ | He asked life of thee, and thou gavest it him, even length of days for ever and ever. | ζωὴν ᾐτήσατό σε, καὶ ἔδωκας αὐτῷ, μακρότητα ἡμερῶν εἰς αἰῶνα αἰῶνος. |
| 5 | גָּד֣וֹל כְּ֭בוֹדוֹ בִּישׁוּעָתֶ֑ךָ ה֥וֹד וְ֝הָדָ֗ר תְּשַׁוֶּ֥ה עָלָֽיו׃ | His glory is great in thy salvation: honour and majesty hast thou laid upon him. | μεγάλη ἡ δόξα αὐτοῦ ἐν τῷ σωτηρίῳ σου, δόξαν καὶ μεγαλοπρέπειαν ἐπιθήσεις ἐπ᾿ αὐτόν· |
| 6 | כִּֽי־תְשִׁיתֵ֣הוּ בְרָכ֣וֹת לָעַ֑ד תְּחַדֵּ֥הוּ בְ֝שִׂמְחָ֗ה אֶת־פָּנֶֽיךָ׃ | For thou hast made him most blessed for ever: thou hast made him exceeding glad with thy countenance. | ὅτι δώσεις αὐτῷ εὐλογίαν εἰς αἰῶνα αἰῶνος, εὐφρανεῖς αὐτὸν ἐν χαρᾷ μετὰ τοῦ προσώπου σου. |
| 7 | כִּֽי־הַ֭מֶּלֶךְ בֹּטֵ֣חַ בַּיהֹוָ֑ה וּבְחֶ֥סֶד עֶ֝לְי֗וֹן בַּל־יִמּֽוֹט׃ | For the king trusteth in the LORD, and through the mercy of the most High he shall not be moved. | ὅτι ὁ βασιλεὺς ἐλπίζει ἐπὶ Κύριον καὶ ἐν τῷ ἐλέει τοῦ ῾Υψίστου οὐ μὴ σαλευθῇ. |
| 8 | תִּמְצָ֣א יָ֭דְךָ לְכׇל־אֹיְבֶ֑יךָ יְ֝מִֽינְךָ֗ תִּמְצָ֥א שֹׂנְאֶֽיךָ׃ | Thine hand shall find out all thine enemies: thy right hand shall find out those that hate thee. | εὑρεθείη ἡ χείρ σου πᾶσι τοῖς ἐχθροῖς σου, ἡ δεξιά σου εὕροι πάντας τοὺς μισοῦντάς σε. |
| 9 | תְּשִׁיתֵ֤מוֹ ׀ כְּתַנּ֥וּר אֵשׁ֮ לְעֵ֢ת פָּ֫נֶ֥יךָ יְ֭הֹוָה בְּאַפּ֣וֹ יְבַלְּעֵ֑ם וְֽתֹאכְלֵ֥ם אֵֽשׁ׃ | Thou shalt make them as a fiery oven in the time of thine anger: the LORD shall swallow them up in his wrath, and the fire shall devour them. | θήσεις αὐτοὺς εἰς κλίβανον πυρὸς εἰς καιρὸν τοῦ προσώπου σου· Κύριος ἐν ὀργῇ αὐτοῦ συνταράξει αὐτούς, καὶ καταφάγεται αὐτοὺς πῦρ. |
| 10 | פִּ֭רְיָמוֹ מֵאֶ֣רֶץ תְּאַבֵּ֑ד וְ֝זַרְעָ֗ם מִבְּנֵ֥י אָדָֽם׃ | Their fruit shalt thou destroy from the earth, and their seed from among the children of men. | τὸν καρπὸν αὐτῶν ἀπὸ τῆς γῆς ἀπολεῖς καὶ τὸ σπέρμα αὐτῶν ἀπὸ υἱῶν ἀνθρώπων, |
| 11 | כִּי־נָט֣וּ עָלֶ֣יךָ רָעָ֑ה חָֽשְׁב֥וּ מְ֝זִמָּ֗ה בַּל־יוּכָֽלוּ׃ | For they intended evil against thee: they imagined a mischievous device, which they are not able to perform. | ὅτι ἔκλιναν εἰς σὲ κακά, διελογίσαντο βουλάς, αἷς οὐ μὴ δύνωνται στῆναι. |
| 12 | כִּ֭י תְּשִׁיתֵ֣מוֹ שֶׁ֑כֶם בְּ֝מֵֽיתָרֶ֗יךָ תְּכוֹנֵ֥ן עַל־פְּנֵיהֶֽם׃ | Therefore shalt thou make them turn their back, when thou shalt make ready thine arrows upon thy strings against the face of them. | ὅτι θήσεις αὐτοὺς νῶτον· ἐν τοῖς περιλοίποις σου ἑτοιμάσεις τὸ πρόσωπον αὐτῶν. |
| 13 | ר֣וּמָה יְהֹוָ֣ה בְּעֻזֶּ֑ךָ נָשִׁ֥ירָה וּֽ֝נְזַמְּרָ֗ה גְּבוּרָתֶֽךָ׃ | Be thou exalted, LORD, in thine own strength: so will we sing and praise thy power. | ὑψώθητι, Κύριε, ἐν τῇ δυνάμει σου· ᾄσομεν καὶ ψαλοῦμεν τὰς δυναστείας σου. |

== Uses ==
In the Church of England's Book of Common Prayer, this psalm is appointed to be read on the morning of the fourth day of the month, as well as at Mattins on Ascension Day.

This psalm has been used as the name of the church ministry known as "Psalm 21 Church" or "Psalm 21 Kingdom Heritage", in Pontianak, West Kalimantan, Indonesia since 2004.

Verses 1-4 are used as the source material for the anthem "O Lord Make Thy Servant Elizabeth" by William Byrd.

== Musical settings ==
A setting of Psalm 21 in English, "O Lord how joyful is the king", by John Bennet was published in 1621 in The Whole Booke of Psalmes, edited by Thomas Ravenscroft. Heinrich Schütz wrote a setting of a paraphrase of the psalm in German, "Hoch freuet sich der König", SWV 118, for the Becker Psalter, published first in 1628. Marc-Antoine Charpentier set a Latin version around 1675, one Prière pour le Roi "Domine in virtute tua", H.164 for 3 voices, 2 treble instruments, and continuo. Handel used verses 1 and 3–5 in English for his Coronation anthem in three movements, The King Shall Rejoice, HWV 260, in 1727.
