= Psalm 20 =

Biblical psalm

- "The LORD hear thee in the day of trouble"
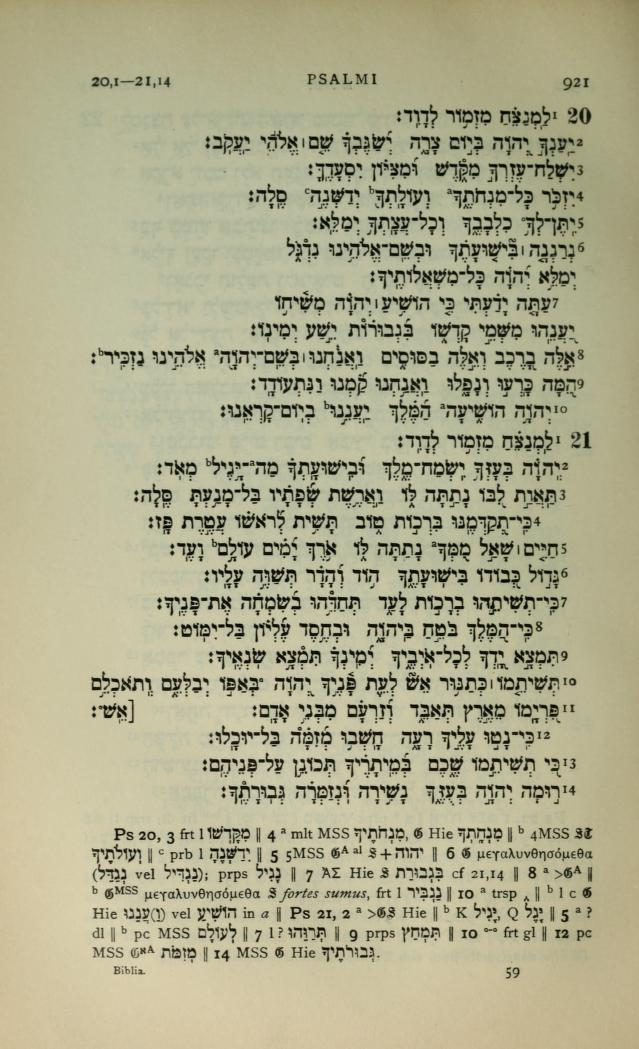
- Psalms 20-21 in Biblia Hebraica Kittel (1909)
- Other name: "Exaudiat te Dominus"
- Text: attributed to David
- Language: Hebrew (original)

Psalm 20
- ← Psalm 19 Psalm 21 →
- Book: Book of Psalms
- Hebrew Bible part: Ketuvim
- Order in the Hebrew part: 1
- Category: Sifrei Emet
- Christian Bible part: Old Testament
- Order in the Christian part: 19

Psalm 20 is the 20th psalm of the Book of Psalms, beginning in English in the King James Version: "The LORD hear thee in the day of trouble". The Book of Psalms is part of the third section of the Hebrew Bible, and a book of the Christian Old Testament. In the slightly different numbering system used in the Greek Septuagint and Latin Vulgate translations of the Bible, this psalm is Psalm 19. In Latin, it is known by the incipit, "Exaudiat te Dominus". The psalm is attributed to David. This psalm and the following one are closely related: they are both liturgical psalms: the first is an intercession, the second is a thanksgiving; in both, the king is the prominent figure.

Psalm 20 is used in both Jewish and Christian liturgies. It has often been set to music.

== History ==
In the International Critical Commentary series, Charles and Emilie Briggs suggest that it was written during the reign of Jehoshaphat.

== Text ==
The following table shows the Hebrew text of the Psalm with vowels, alongside the Koine Greek text in the Septuagint and the English translation from the King James Version. Note that the meaning can slightly differ between these versions, as the Septuagint and the Masoretic Text come from different textual traditions. (Note: A 1917 translation directly from Hebrew to English by the Jewish Publication Society can be found here or here, and an 1844 translation directly from the Septuagint by L. C. L. Brenton can be found here. Both translations are in the public domain.) In the Septuagint, this psalm is numbered Psalm 19.

#	Hebrew	English	Greek
(Note: In the Jewish verse numbering, the ascription of this psalm is verse 1, and the rest of the psalm begins from verse 2. However, the Christian verse numbering does not count the ascription as a separate verse.)	לַמְנַצֵּ֗חַ מִזְמ֥וֹר לְדָוִֽד׃	(To the chief Musician, A Psalm of David.)	Εἰς τὸ τέλος· ψαλμὸς τῷ Δαυΐδ. -
1	יַֽעַנְךָ֣ יְ֭הֹוָה בְּי֣וֹם צָרָ֑ה יְ֝שַׂגֶּבְךָ֗ שֵׁ֤ם ׀ אֱלֹהֵ֬י יַעֲקֹֽב׃	The LORD hear thee in the day of trouble; the name of the God of Jacob defend thee;	ΕΠΑΚΟΥΣΑΙ σου Κύριος ἐν ἡμέρᾳ θλίψεως, ὑπερασπίσαι σου τὸ ὄνομα τοῦ Θεοῦ ᾿Ιακώβ.
2	יִשְׁלַֽח־עֶזְרְךָ֥ מִקֹּ֑דֶשׁ וּ֝מִצִּיּ֗וֹן יִסְעָדֶֽךָּ׃	Send thee help from the sanctuary, and strengthen thee out of Zion;	ἐξαποστείλαι σοι βοήθειαν ἐξ ἁγίου καὶ ἐκ Σιὼν ἀντιλάβοιτό σου.
3	יִזְכֹּ֥ר כׇּל־מִנְחֹתֶ֑ךָ וְעוֹלָתְךָ֖ יְדַשְּׁנֶ֣ה סֶֽלָה׃	Remember all thy offerings, and accept thy burnt sacrifice; Selah.	μνησθείη πάσης θυσίας σου καὶ τὸ ὁλοκαύτωμά σου πιανάτω. (διάψαλμα).
4	יִֽתֶּן־לְךָ֥ כִלְבָבֶ֑ךָ וְֽכׇל־עֲצָתְךָ֥ יְמַלֵּֽא׃	Grant thee according to thine own heart, and fulfil all thy counsel.	δῴη σοι Κύριος κατὰ τὴν καρδίαν σου καὶ πᾶσαν τὴν βουλήν σου πληρώσαι.
5	נְרַנְּנָ֤ה ׀ בִּ֘ישׁ֤וּעָתֶ֗ךָ וּבְשֵֽׁם־אֱלֹהֵ֥ינוּ נִדְגֹּ֑ל יְמַלֵּ֥א יְ֝הֹוָ֗ה כׇּל־מִשְׁאֲלוֹתֶֽיךָ׃	We will rejoice in thy salvation, and in the name of our God we will set up our banners: the LORD fulfil all thy petitions.	ἀγαλλιασόμεθα ἐν τῷ σωτηρίῳ σου καὶ ἐν ὀνόματι Κυρίου Θεοῦ ἡμῶν μεγαλυνθησόμεθα. πληρώσαι Κύριος πάντα τὰ αἰτήματά σου.
6	עַתָּ֤ה יָדַ֗עְתִּי כִּ֤י הוֹשִׁ֥יעַ ׀ יְהֹוָ֗ה מְשִׁ֫יח֥וֹ יַ֭עֲנֵהוּ מִשְּׁמֵ֣י קׇדְשׁ֑וֹ בִּ֝גְבֻר֗וֹת יֵ֣שַׁע יְמִינֽוֹ׃	Now know I that the LORD saveth his anointed; he will hear him from his holy heaven with the saving strength of his right hand.	νῦν ἔγνων ὅτι ἔσωσε Κύριος τὸν χριστὸν αὐτοῦ· ἐπακούσεται αὐτοῦ ἐξ οὐρανοῦ ἁγίου αὐτοῦ· ἐν δυναστείαις ἡ σωτηρία τῆς δεξιᾶς αὐτοῦ.
7	אֵ֣לֶּה בָ֭רֶכֶב וְאֵ֣לֶּה בַסּוּסִ֑ים וַאֲנַ֓חְנוּ ׀ בְּשֵׁם־יְהֹוָ֖ה אֱלֹהֵ֣ינוּ נַזְכִּֽיר׃	Some trust in chariots, and some in horses: but we will remember the name of the LORD our God.	οὗτοι ἐν ἅρμασι καὶ οὗτοι ἐν ἵπποις, ἡμεῖς δὲ ἐν ὀνόματι Κυρίου Θεοῦ ἡμῶν μεγαλυνθησόμεθα.
8	הֵ֭מָּה כָּרְע֣וּ וְנָפָ֑לוּ וַאֲנַ֥חְנוּ קַּ֝֗מְנוּ וַנִּתְעוֹדָֽד׃	They are brought down and fallen: but we are risen, and stand upright.	αὐτοὶ συνεποδίσθησαν καὶ ἔπεσαν, ἡμεῖς δὲ ἀνέστημεν καὶ ἀνωρθώθημεν.
9	יְהֹוָ֥ה הוֹשִׁ֑יעָה הַ֝מֶּ֗לֶךְ יַעֲנֵ֥נוּ בְיוֹם־קׇרְאֵֽנוּ׃	Save, LORD: let the king hear us when we call.	Κύριε, σῶσον τὸν βασιλέα, καὶ ἐπάκουσον ἡμῶν, ἐν ᾗ ἂν ἡμέρᾳ ἐπικαλεσώμεθά σε.

== Usage ==
=== In Jewish prayer ===
The 70 words in this psalm may reference the 70 years of exile between the first and second temples, or as suggested in the Zohar, the 70 cries of pain associated with child birth. It has been inserted into daily prayer following the loss of the second temple to symbolize the somber period prior to the construction of the third temple.

It is used in Jewish prayer in several ways:

- The psalm is recited daily in most communities. In Sephardic communities (as well as some Hassidic communities, including Chabad), it is omitted on any day that Tachnun is omitted. On Ashkenazic communities, it is omitted only on Shabbat, Yom Tov, Rosh Chodesh, Chol Hamoed, Tisha B'Av, Hanukkah, Purim, Shushan Purim, the 14th and 15th of Adar I, and Erev Yom Kippur and Erev Passover (some communities, such as Frankfurt Am Main, omit it also on the day proceeding every Festival and the day immediately following a festival (Isru Chag)). In this context it is known as Lamenatzeiach (the first word of the psalm in Hebrew), and is recited between Ashrei and Uva Letziyon toward the end of Shacharit. In the Italian rite, it is recited as part of long Tachnun (recited on Mondays and Thursdays), but it is never recited between Ashrei and Uva Letziyon.
- Verses 2 and 10 are part of the opening paragraph of the long Tachanun recited on Mondays and Thursdays.
- Verse 10 is the 11th verse of V'hu Rachum in Pesukei Dezimra, is the final verse of Yehi Kivod in Pesukei Dezimra, is found in Uva Letzion, is the second of two verses recited as an introduction at Maariv, and is part of Havdalah.
- It is also considered appropriate to recite in times of stress, such as when in labor.
- It is recited either at the beginning or the end of the Yom Kippur Katan services.

=== Coptic Orthodox Church ===
In the Agpeya, the Coptic Church's book of hours, this psalm is prayed in the office of Terce.

=== Book of Common Prayer ===
In the Church of England's Book of Common Prayer, this psalm is appointed to be read on the morning of the fourth day of the month.

== Ancient pagan version ==
In the 1980s, a new papyrus, known as Papyrus Amherst 63, was translated. This papyrus was discovered in the late 19th century at Luxor (ancient Thebes), and is currently hold at the Morgan Library in New York. According to Karel van der Toorn, it dates towards the 4th century BC (although the texts contained there were probably composed in the 7th century BC at the latest) and contains a sort of "pagan" and "Northern Israelite" version of Psalm 20 in Aramaic (with demotic script).

== Musical settings ==
Psalm 20 was set in a German paraphrase by Heinrich Schütz for the Becker Psalter, "Der Herr erhört dich in der Not" (The Lord will hear you in need), SWV 116. This psalm in Latin was set to music in 1688 by Michel-Richard de Lalande, as a grand motet (S.36, music lost). André Campra set one grand motet. Marc-Antoine Charpentier set around 1670 one "Exaudiat te Dominus", H.162 for soloists, double chorus, double orchestra (flutes and strings), and continuo, around 1675 one "Prière pour le Roi" H.165 for 3 voices, 2 treble instruments, and continuo. At the beginning of the 1680s, he set another one, "Exaudiat pour le Roi à 4", H.180, ( H.180 a, H.180 b, 1690) for soloists, chorus, and continuo. Henry Desmarest set one grand motet "Exaudiat te Dominus". François Giroust set on grand motet Exaudiat te Dominus in 1787.
