= Codex Veronensis (Psalter) =

6th-century manuscript of the Psalter

Codex Veronensis (R) is a 6th-century manuscript of the Psalter, with the shelfmark "Verona, Chapter Library I (1)." It is a bilingual manuscript in Greek and Latin. The Greek text is that of the Septuagint; the Latin is a unique version of the Old Latin.

The manuscript consists of 405 leaves, measuring 27 x 20 cms. Each page contains 26 lines. The text is written in an uncial hand of the 6-7th century, probably written in the north of Italy. The Greek text appears at each opening on the left-hand page, and the Latin on the right.

Both texts are written in Roman characters. A few lacunae (Ps. 1. 1—2. 7, 65. 20—68. 3, 68. 26—33, 105. 43—106. 2) have been supplied by a later hand, which has also added the ψαλμὸς ἰδιόγραφος (Ps. 151.). The Psalms are followed prima manu by eight canticles (Exod. 15. 1—21, Deut. 32. 1—44, 1 Regn. 2. 1—10, Isa. 5. 1—9, Jon. 2. 3—10, Hab. 3. 1—10, Magnificat, Dan. 3. 23 ff.).

== Old Bibliography ==
Printed by J. Bianchini in his Vindiciae canonicarum scripturarum Vulgatae Latinae editionis..., (Rome, 1740), p.1-278, and used by Lagarde in the apparatus of his Specimen and Psalterii Gr. quinquagena prima, and in the Cambridge manual Septuagint (1891). A new collation was made in 1892 by H. A. Redpath, which has been employed in 142the second edition of The Old Testament in Greek (1896); but it is much to be wished that the Verona Chapter may find it possible to have this important Psalter photographed.
