= Jeremiah 10 =

Book of Jeremiah, chapter 10

- ← chapter 9 chapter 11 →
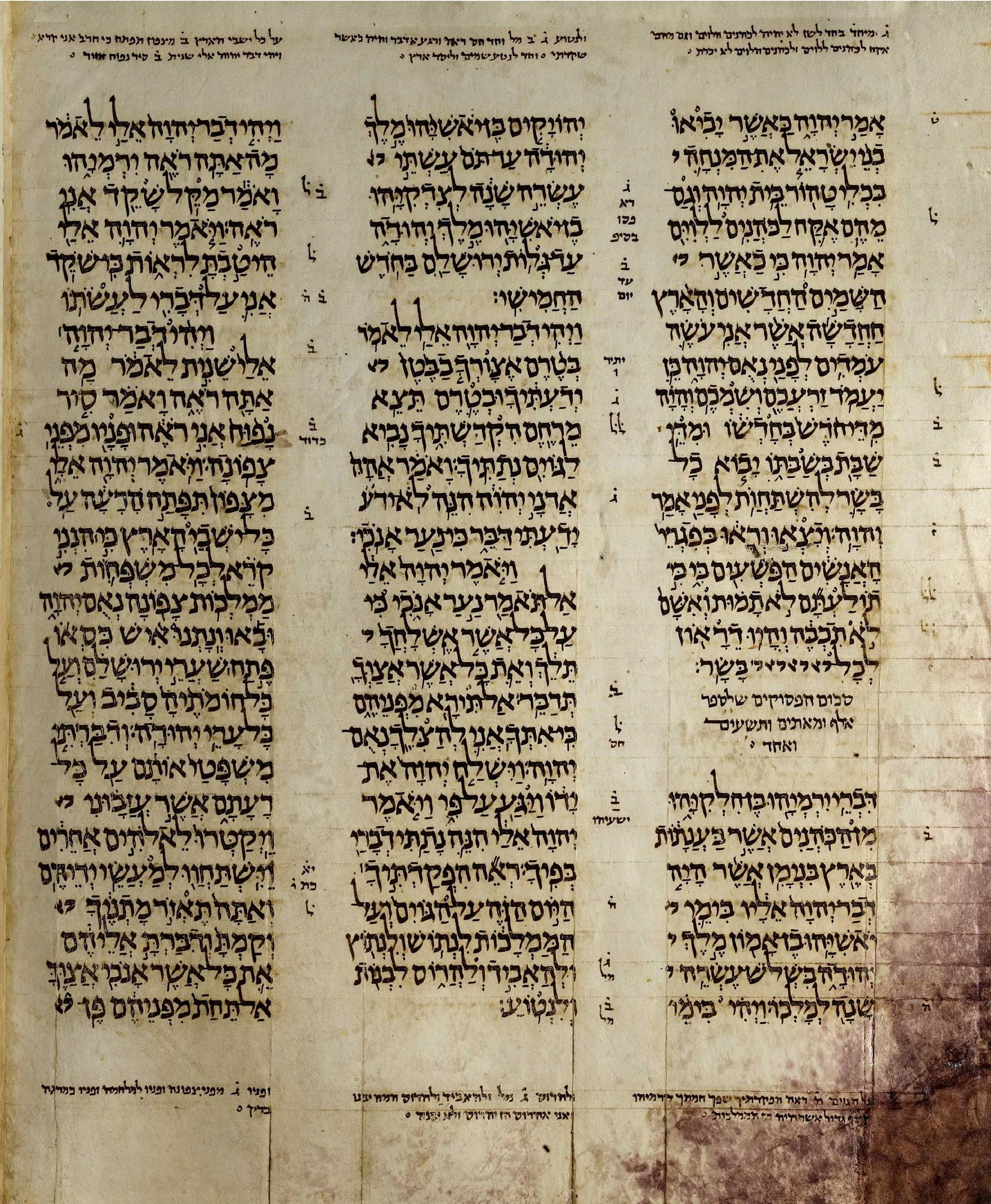
- A high resolution scan of the Aleppo Codex showing the Book of Jeremiah (the sixth book in Nevi'im).
- Book: Book of Jeremiah
- Hebrew Bible part: Nevi'im
- Order in the Hebrew part: 6
- Category: Latter Prophets
- Christian Bible part: Old Testament
- Order in the Christian part: 24

Jeremiah 10 is the tenth chapter of the Book of Jeremiah in the Hebrew Bible or the Old Testament of the Christian Bible. This book contains prophecies attributed to the prophet Jeremiah, and is one of the Books of the Prophets. It is also notable for containing the only verse in the Book of Jeremiah to be written in Aramaic, Jeremiah 10:11.

== Text ==
The original text was written in Hebrew language, except for verse 11 written entirely in Aramaic language. This chapter is divided into 25 verses.

=== Textual witnesses ===
Some early manuscripts containing the text of this chapter in Hebrew are of the Masoretic Text tradition, which includes the Codex Cairensis (895), the Petersburg Codex of the Prophets (916), Aleppo Codex (10th century), Codex Leningradensis (1008). Some fragments containing parts of this chapter were found among the Dead Sea Scrolls, i.e., 4QJer^{a} (4Q70; 225-175 BCE) with extant verses 9‑14, 23, 4QJer^{b} (4Q71; mid 2nd century BCE) with extant verses 1–5, 9, 11–21, and 4QJer^{c} (4Q72; 1st century BC) with extant verses 12‑13 (similar to Masoretic Text).

There is also a translation into Koine Greek known as the Septuagint (with a different verse numbering), made in the last few centuries BCE. Extant ancient manuscripts of the Septuagint version include Codex Vaticanus (B; $\mathfrak{G}$^{B}; 4th century), Codex Sinaiticus (S; BHK: $\mathfrak{G}$^{S}; 4th century), Codex Alexandrinus (A; $\mathfrak{G}$^{A}; 5th century) and Codex Marchalianus (Q; $\mathfrak{G}$^{Q}; 6th century). The Septuagint version doesn't contain parts what are generally known to be verses 6-8 and 10 in Christian Bibles.

== Parashot ==
The parashah sections listed here are based on the Aleppo Codex. Jeremiah 10 is a part of the Fourth prophecy (Jeremiah 7-10) in the section of Prophecies of Destruction (Jeremiah 1-25). {P}: open parashah; {S}: closed parashah.

{P} 10:1-5 {P} 10:6-10 {P} 10:11 {S} 10:12-16 {S} 10:17 {S} 10:18 {S} 10:19-21 {P} 10:22 {S} 10:23-25 {P}

== The Sovereignty of God (10:1–16) ==
=== Verse 9 ===
Silver is beaten into plates;
It is brought from Tarshish,
and gold from Uphaz,
The work of the craftsman
and of the hands of the metalsmith;
Blue and purple are their clothing;
They are all the work of skillful men.

This verse is repositioned within verse 4 in the Jerusalem Bible.

=== Verse 11 ===
Thus you shall say to them: "The gods that have not made the heavens and the earth shall perish from the earth and from under these heavens."

==== Verse 11 in Aramaic and Hebrew ====
Original text (Aramaic)

כִּדְנָה תֵּאמְרוּן לְהוֹם אֱלָהַיָּא דִּי־שְׁמַיָּא וְאַרְקָא לָא עֲבַדוּ יֵאבַדוּ מֵאַרְעָא וּמִן־תְּחוֹת שְׁמַיָּא אֵלֶּה׃ ס

Transliteration of the Aramaic text

kidna temerun lehom; elahaiya di-shemaiya ve'arka la avadu, yevadu me'ar'a umin-tekhot shemaiya eleh. (s)

Hebrew translation for comparison:

כֹּה תֹּאמְרוּ לָהֶם הָאֱלֹהִים אֳשֶּׁר שָׁמַיִּם וָאָרֶץ לֹא עָשׂוּ יֹאבְדוּ מִן הָאָרֶץ וּמִן תַחַת שָׁמַיִּם אֵלֶּה

Transliteration of the Hebrew text

ko tomeru lahem; ha'elohim asher shamayim va'arets lo assu, yovedu min ha'arets umin takhat shamayim eleh.

==== Verse 11 Analysis ====
This is the only verse in the book of Jeremiah not written in Hebrew, but in Aramaic or Chaldean, the language which was commonly spoken in Babylonia in 6th century BC. Biblical scholars Michael Coogan et al. state that it is "a gloss in Aramaic". It is shown as a textual insert by the New International and New King James versions. The Targum of Jeremiah (the Aramaic translation of the book of Jeremiah) states that this verse is instructing the exiled Jews on how to respond in the face of idolatrous temptations as a part of a letter sent to the elders in exile, starting Jeremiah 10:11 with:

This is a copy of the letter that Jeremiah the prophet sent to the rest of the elders of the exile who were in Babylon, that if the nations among whom you are (living) say to you, “Worship the idols, O house of Israel,” so you shall reply and so you shall say to them...

Garnett Reid writes that Jeremiah 10:11 is a summary of the Jews’ theology “designed as a kerygmatic challenge they are to deliver to their Babylonian captors”, placing the Babylonians on notice with this lone Aramaic statement in the prophecy.

=== Verse 13 ===
When He utters His voice,

There is a multitude of waters in the heavens:

"And He causes the vapors to ascend from the ends of the earth.

He makes lightning for the rain,
He brings the wind out of His treasuries."

- Cross reference: Psalm 135:7

Jeremiah reminded the people that God has control of nature and their ongoing life.

== The coming captivity of Judah (10:17–25) ==
The temporal threshold of exile is dramatically voiced by at least two speakers:

1. YHWH (verses 17–18; probably verse 22) announcing the exile and the siege.
2. Daughter Zion (verses 19–21; probably verses 23–25) lamenting her fate (cf. Isaiah 54:1–3; she is bereft of children, verse 20; her leaders have wounded her and her people are scattered verse 21) and pleading YHWH for justice.

The voice in verses 24–25 speaking from exile that YHWH, in turn, would 'punish those who have devastated Israel, if Israel repents' (cf. Jeremiah 3:21–25; 10:1–16).

== See also ==
- Israel
- Jacob
- Tarshish
- Uphaz
- Related Bible parts: Psalm 135, Jeremiah 9

== Sources ==
- O'Connor, Kathleen M. (2007). "23. Jeremiah". In Barton, John; Muddiman, John (eds.). The Oxford Bible Commentary (first (paperback) ed.). Oxford University Press. pp. 487–533. ISBN 978-0199277186.
- Ulrich, Eugene, ed. (2010). The Biblical Qumran Scrolls: Transcriptions and Textual Variants. Brill.
- Würthwein, Ernst (1995). The Text of the Old Testament. Translated by Rhodes, Erroll F. Grand Rapids, MI: Wm. B. Eerdmans. ISBN 978-0-8028-0788-5.
