= Jeremiah 4 =

Book of Jeremiah, chapter 4

- ← chapter 3 chapter 5 →
- Book of Jeremiah in Hebrew Bible, MS. Sassoon 1053, images 283-315.
- Book: Book of Jeremiah
- Hebrew Bible part: Nevi'im
- Order in the Hebrew part: 6
- Category: Latter Prophets
- Christian Bible part: Old Testament
- Order in the Christian part: 24

Jeremiah 4 is the fourth chapter of the Book of Jeremiah in the Hebrew Bible or the Old Testament of the Christian Bible. This book contains prophecies attributed to the prophet Jeremiah, and is one of the Books of the Prophets. Chapters 2 to 6 contain the earliest preaching of Jeremiah on the apostasy of Israel.

== Text ==
The original text of this chapter, as with the rest of the Book of Jeremiah, was written in Hebrew language. Since the division of the Bible into chapters and verses in the late medieval period, this chapter is divided into 31 verses.

=== Textual witnesses ===
Some early manuscripts containing the text of this chapter in Hebrew are of the Masoretic Text tradition, which includes the Codex Cairensis (895), the Petersburg Codex of the Prophets (916), Aleppo Codex (10th century), Codex Leningradensis (1008). Some fragments containing parts of this chapter were found among the Dead Sea Scrolls, i.e., 4QJer^{c} (4Q72; 1st century BC), with extant verses 4:5(‑6), 13‑16 (similar to Masoretic Text).

There is also a translation into Koine Greek known as the Septuagint, made in the last few centuries BCE. Extant ancient manuscripts of the Septuagint version include Codex Vaticanus (B; $\mathfrak{G}$^{B}; 4th century), Codex Sinaiticus (S; BHK: $\mathfrak{G}$^{S}; 4th century), Codex Alexandrinus (A; $\mathfrak{G}$^{A}; 5th century) and Codex Marchalianus (Q; $\mathfrak{G}$^{Q}; 6th century). Among the Chester Beatty Papyri (BHK: $\mathfrak{G}$^{Beatty}) are the fragments of Jeremiah (Rahlfs 966; Chester Beatty Library (CBL) BP VIII), dated from the late second century or early third century AD, containing Jeremiah 4:30–5:1; 5:9–13; 5:13–14; 5:23–24.

== Parashot ==
The parashah sections listed here are based on the Aleppo Codex. Jeremiah 4 is a part of the Third prophecy (Jeremiah 3:6-6:30) in the section of Prophecies of Destruction (Jeremiah 1-25). {P}: open parashah; {S}: closed parashah.

{S} 4:1-2 {S} 4:3-8 {P} 4:9 {S} 4:10-18 {P} 4:19-21 {P} 4:22-31 {S}

== Jeremiah laments over Judah (verses 1–18) ==
=== Verse 2 ===
And thou shalt swear, The Lord liveth,

in truth, in judgment, and in righteousness;

and the nations shall bless themselves in him,

and in him shall they glory.

The word "him" is capitalised in the New King James Version: "Him", i.e. God. The Jerusalem Bible reads:

... the nations shall bless themselves by you

and glory in you.

=== Verses 3–4 ===
Several metaphors here relate to repentance and reformation:

- Break up your fallow ground: Leviticus 25:1–13 prescribed that the people of Israel could work the fields for six years, but in the seventh year, the land was to remain fallow.
- Do not sow among thorns
- Circumcise yourselves to the Lord.

== Sorrow for the doomed nation (verses 19–31) ==
=== Verse 23 ===
I beheld the earth, and, lo,

it was without form, and void;

and the heavens,

and they had no light.

- "Without form and void" is translated from the Hebrew phrase תֹהוּ וָבֹהוּ, tohu wa vohu, "formless and empty", a form of hendiadys (two nouns joined by "and" both describe the same thing, with one noun retains its full nominal force, whereas the other functions as an adjective), which alludes to Genesis 1:2 (a hyperbolical image of the original precreation chaos).

== In popular culture ==
- Godspeed You! Black Emperor's Slow Riot for New Zero Kanada EP contains a copy of verses 23-27 in its liner notes in both the original Hebrew and the JPS 1917 translation.

== See also ==
- Dan
- Mount Ephraim
- Israel
- Judah
- Jerusalem
- Zion
- Related Bible parts: Deuteronomy 6, Isaiah 45, Jeremiah 3

== Bibliography ==
- Würthwein, Ernst (1995). The Text of the Old Testament. Translated by Rhodes, Erroll F. Grand Rapids, MI: Wm. B. Eerdmans. ISBN 978-0-8028-0788-5.
