= Jeremiah 9 =

Book of Jeremiah, chapter 9

- ← chapter 8 chapter 10 →
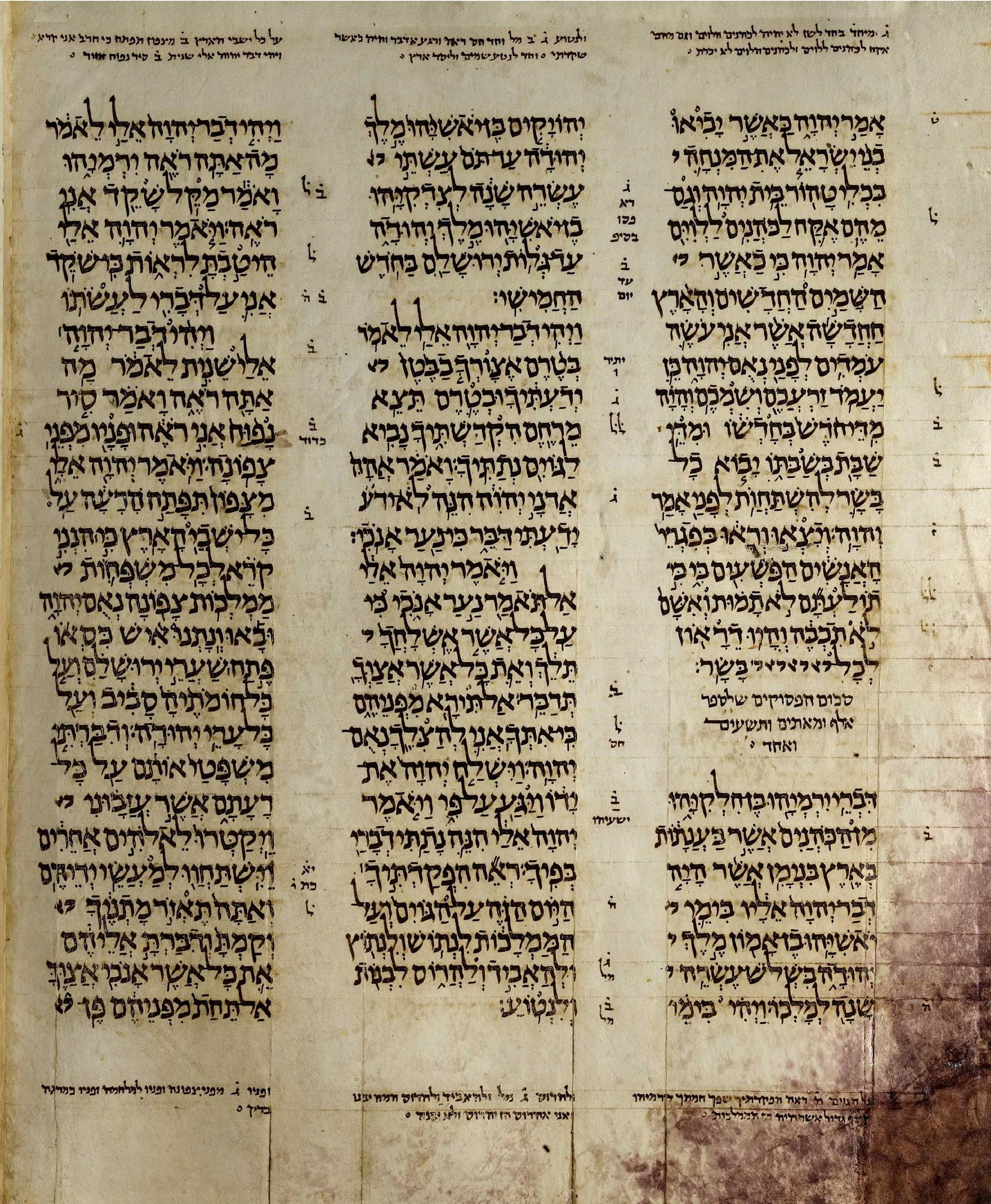
- A high resolution scan of the Aleppo Codex showing the Book of Jeremiah (the sixth book in Nevi'im).
- Book: Book of Jeremiah
- Hebrew Bible part: Nevi'im
- Order in the Hebrew part: 6
- Category: Latter Prophets
- Christian Bible part: Old Testament
- Order in the Christian part: 24

Jeremiah 9 is the ninth chapter of the Book of Jeremiah in the Hebrew Bible or the Old Testament of the Christian Bible. This book contains prophecies attributed to the prophet Jeremiah, and is one of the Books of the Prophets.

== Text ==
The original text was written in Hebrew language. This chapter is divided into 26 verses in Christian Bibles, but 25 verses in the Hebrew Bible, Hebrew manuscripts and in the JPS Version, where the verses Jeremiah 8:23 + Jeremiah 9:1-25 are numbered as Jeremiah 9:1-26 in Christian Bibles. This article generally follows the common numbering in Christian English Bible versions, with notes to the numbering in Hebrew Bible versions.

=== Textual witnesses ===
Some early manuscripts containing the text of this chapter in Hebrew are of the Masoretic Text tradition, which includes the Codex Cairensis (895), the Petersburg Codex of the Prophets (916), Aleppo Codex (10th century), Codex Leningradensis (1008). Some fragments containing parts of this chapter were found among the Dead Sea Scrolls, i.e., 4QJer^{a} (4Q70; 225-175 BCE) with extant verses 1‑3, 8‑16 [Hebrew: 8:23; 9:1-2, 7-15], 4QJer^{b} (4Q71; mid 2nd century BCE) with extant verses 23‑24, 26 [Hebrew: 22-23, 25], and 4QJer^{c} (4Q72; 1st century BC) with extant verses 1‑6 [Hebrew: 8:23; 9:1-5] (similar to Masoretic Text).

There is also a translation into Koine Greek known as the Septuagint, made in the last few centuries BCE. Extant ancient manuscripts of the Septuagint version include Codex Vaticanus (B; $\mathfrak{G}$^{B}; 4th century), Codex Sinaiticus (S; BHK: $\mathfrak{G}$^{S}; 4th century), Codex Alexandrinus (A; $\mathfrak{G}$^{A}; 5th century) and Codex Marchalianus (Q; $\mathfrak{G}$^{Q}; 6th century).

== Parashot ==
The parashah sections listed here are based on the Aleppo Codex. Jeremiah 9 is a part of the Fourth prophecy (Jeremiah 7-10) in the section of Prophecies of Destruction (Jeremiah 1-25). As mentioned in the "Text" section, verses 8:23 + 9:1-25 in the Hebrew Bible below are numbered as 9:1-26 in Christian Bibles. {P}: open parashah; {S}: closed parashah.

{S} 8:23 {S}{S} 9:1-5 {S} 9:6-8 {S} 9:9-10 {S} 9:11 {S} 9:12-13 {P} 9:14-15 {P} 9:16-18 {S} 9:19-21 {S} 9:22-23 {S} 9:24-25 {P}

== Verse 1 ==
Oh, that my head were waters,
And my eyes a fountain of tears,
That I might weep day and night
For the slain of the daughter of my people!

This verse is Jeremiah 8:23 in Hebrew manuscripts and in the JPS Version.

== Verse 25 ==
"Behold, the days are coming," says the Lord,
"that I will punish all who are circumcised with the uncircumcised."

Cross reference: Ezekiel 6:5

- "Behold, the days are coming": a typical phrase in Jeremiah's prophecy.

== Verse 26 ==
"Egypt, Judah, Edom, the people of Ammon, Moab, and all who are in the farthest corners, who dwell in the wilderness.
For all these nations are uncircumcised, and all the house of Israel are uncircumcised in the heart."

- "Uncircumcised in the heart": denoting "the physical marks of religious devotion ... without an obedient will." Circumcision as a sign of God's covenant with Abraham was meaningless without a faithful heart to God; God would ignore it when it was just "an outward symbol" (Deuteronomy 10:12–22).

== See also ==
- Ammon
- Moab
- Egypt
- Israel
- Judah
- Edom
- Jerusalem
- Zion
- Related Bible parts: Deuteronomy 10, Jeremiah 8

== Sources ==
- The Nelson Study Bible. Thomas Nelson, Inc. 1997. ISBN 9780840715999.
- Ulrich, Eugene, ed. (2010). The Biblical Qumran Scrolls: Transcriptions and Textual Variants. Brill.
- Würthwein, Ernst (1995). The Text of the Old Testament. Translated by Rhodes, Erroll F. Grand Rapids, MI: Wm. B. Eerdmans. ISBN 978-0-8028-0788-5.
