= Jeremiah 8 =

Book of Jeremiah, chapter 8

- ← chapter 7 chapter 9 →
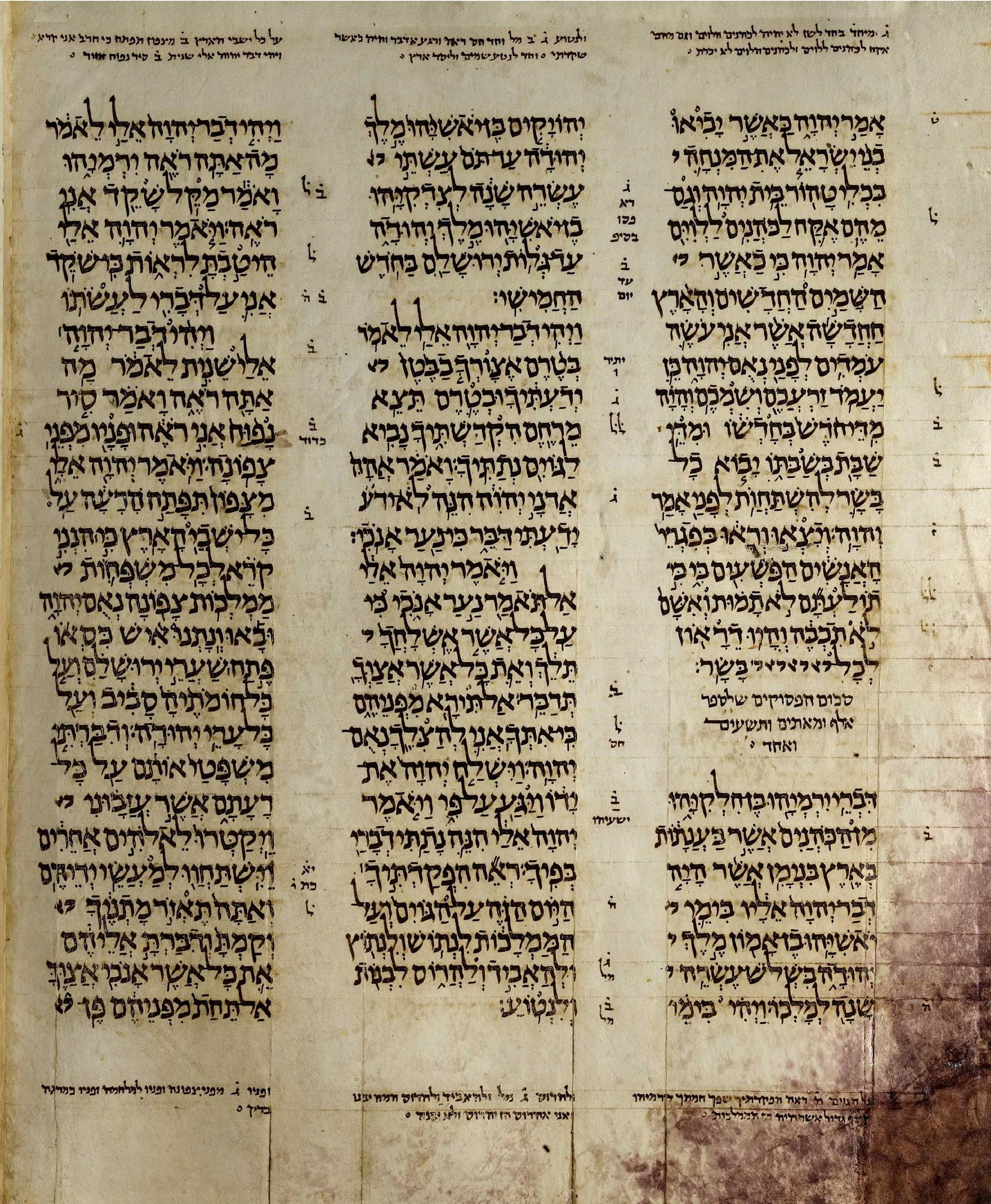
- A high resolution scan of the Aleppo Codex showing the Book of Jeremiah (the sixth book in Nevi'im).
- Book: Book of Jeremiah
- Hebrew Bible part: Nevi'im
- Order in the Hebrew part: 6
- Category: Latter Prophets
- Christian Bible part: Old Testament
- Order in the Christian part: 24

Jeremiah 8 is the eighth chapter of the Book of Jeremiah in the Hebrew Bible or the Old Testament of the Christian Bible. This book contains prophecies attributed to the prophet Jeremiah and is one of the Books of the Prophets. Chapters 7 to 10 constitute an address delivered by Jeremiah at the gate of the Temple in Jerusalem.

== Text ==
The original text was written in Hebrew language. This chapter is divided into 22 verses in Christian Bibles, but 23 verses in the Hebrew Bible, Hebrew manuscripts and in the JPS Version, where Jeremiah 9:1 is recorded as Jeremiah 8:23. This article generally follows the common numbering in Christian English Bible versions, with notes to the numbering in Hebrew Bible versions.

Verses 1-3 are treated as an extension of chapter 7 by the Jerusalem Bible and by commentator A. W. Streane in the Cambridge Bible for Schools and Colleges.

=== Textual witnesses ===
Some early manuscripts containing the text of this chapter in Hebrew are of the Masoretic Text tradition, which includes the Codex Cairensis (895), the Petersburg Codex of the Prophets (916), Aleppo Codex (10th century), Codex Leningradensis (1008). Some fragments containing parts of this chapter were found among the Dead Sea Scrolls, i.e., 4QJer^{a} (4Q70; 225-175 BCE) with extant verses 1‑22, and 4QJer^{c} (4Q72; 1st century BC) with extant verses 1‑3, 21‑22 (similar to Masoretic Text).

There is also a translation into Koine Greek known as the Septuagint (with a different verse numbering), made in the last few centuries BCE. Extant ancient manuscripts of the Septuagint version include Codex Vaticanus (B; $\mathfrak{G}$^{B}; 4th century), Codex Sinaiticus (S; BHK: $\mathfrak{G}$^{S}; 4th century), Codex Alexandrinus (A; $\mathfrak{G}$^{A}; 5th century) and Codex Marchalianus (Q; $\mathfrak{G}$^{Q}; 6th century). Verses 10-12 are not included in the Septuagint version.

== Parashot ==
The parashah sections listed here are based on the Aleppo Codex. Jeremiah 8 is a part of the Fourth prophecy (Jeremiah 7-10) in the section of Prophecies of Destruction (Jeremiah 1-25). As mentioned in the "Text" section, verses 8:1-23 in the Hebrew Bible below are numbered as 8:1-22 + 9:1 in the Christian Bible. {P}: open parashah; {S}: closed parashah.

[{P} 7:32-34] 8:1-3 {S} 8:4-12 {P}8:13-16 {P} 8:17 {S} 8:18-22 {S} 8:23 {S}

== Verse 1 ==
“At that time,” says the Lord, “they shall bring out the bones of the kings of Judah, and the bones of its princes, and the bones of the priests, and the bones of the prophets, and the bones of the inhabitants of Jerusalem, out of their graves.

Cross reference: Ezekiel 6:5

According to the first-century Jewish historian Josephus, Hyrcanus and Herod broke into the sepulchre of David to take the treasures, but the tombs of the kings were inaccessible.

== Verse 2 ==
They shall spread them before the sun and the moon and all the host of heaven, which they have loved and which they have served and after which they have walked, which they have sought and which they have worshiped.

According to Streane, the bones were laid out before the sun and the moon so that "the objects of their former devotion might look down on the indignities to which those who had served them were subject".

== Verse 7 ==
Even the stork in the heavens knows her appointed times; and the turtledove, the swift, and the swallow observe the time of their coming.

But My people do not know the judgment of the Lord.

The King James Version refers to the turtledove simply as a "turtle"; the name "turtle" is derived from Latin: turtur, which came originally from Latin tortur, onomatopoeic for the song of the bird (scientific name: Streptopelia turtur) and has no connection with the reptile turtle.

== Verse 22 ==
Is there no balm in Gilead,
Is there no physician there?
Why then is there no recovery
For the health of the daughter of my people?

- "Balm in Gilead" : Storax balsam, medicinal resin produced in north Transjordan (Jeremiah 46:11).

== See also ==
- Gilead
- Jerusalem
- Related Bible parts: Isaiah 38, Jeremiah 7, Ezekiel 6

== Bibliography ==
- Ulrich, Eugene, ed. (2010). The Biblical Qumran Scrolls: Transcriptions and Textual Variants. Brill.
- Würthwein, Ernst (1995). The Text of the Old Testament. Translated by Rhodes, Erroll F. Grand Rapids, MI: Wm. B. Eerdmans. ISBN 978-0-8028-0788-5.
