= Jeremiah 11 =

Book of Jeremiah, chapter 11

- ← chapter 10 chapter 12 →
- Book of Jeremiah in Hebrew Bible, MS. Sassoon 1053, images 283–315.
- Book: Book of Jeremiah
- Hebrew Bible part: Nevi'im
- Order in the Hebrew part: 6
- Category: Latter Prophets
- Christian Bible part: Old Testament
- Order in the Christian part: 24

Jeremiah 11 is the eleventh chapter of the Book of Jeremiah in the Hebrew Bible or the Old Testament of the Christian Bible. This book contains prophecies attributed to the prophet Jeremiah, and is one of the Books of the Prophets. This chapter includes the first of the passages known as the "Confessions of Jeremiah" (Jeremiah 11:18–12:6).

== Text ==
The original text was written in Hebrew language. This chapter is divided into 23 verses.

=== Textual witnesses ===
Some early manuscripts containing the text of this chapter in Hebrew are of the Masoretic Text tradition, which includes the Codex Cairensis (895), the Petersburg Codex of the Prophets (916), Aleppo Codex (10th century), Codex Leningradensis (1008). Some fragments containing parts of this chapter were found among the Dead Sea Scrolls, i.e., 4QJer^{a} (4Q70; 225–175 BCE), with extant verses 3‑6, 19‑20.

There is also a translation into Koine Greek known as the Septuagint (with a different verse numbering), made in the last few centuries BCE. Extant ancient manuscripts of the Septuagint version include Codex Vaticanus (B; $\mathfrak{G}$^{B}; 4th century), Codex Sinaiticus (S; BHK: $\mathfrak{G}$^{S}; 4th century), Codex Alexandrinus (A; $\mathfrak{G}$^{A}; 5th century) and Codex Marchalianus (Q; $\mathfrak{G}$^{Q}; 6th century). The Septuagint version doesn't contain a part what is generally known to be verses 7–8 in Christian Bibles.

== Parashot ==
The parashah sections listed here are based on the Aleppo Codex. Jeremiah 11 is a part of the Fifth prophecy (Jeremiah 11-13) in the section of Prophecies of Destruction (Jeremiah 1-25). {P}: open parashah; {S}: closed parashah.

{P} 11:1–5 {P} 11:6–8 {S} 11:9–10 {S} 11:11–13 {S} 11:14 {S} 11:15–17 {P} 11:18–20 {S} 11:21 {P} 11:22–23 {S}

== Covenant Curse (11:1–17) ==
This section contains the 'second major prose sermon' in the book of Jeremiah, closely related in style to the 'temple sermon' (Jeremiah 7:1–8:3), in which a curse in announced 'upon anyone who does not heed the words of the Mosaic covenant' (verses 3–4), focusing on the point that 'the possession of the land hinges entirely upon obedience to the covenant' (verse 5).

=== Verses 2–3 ===
==== Verse 2 ====
"Hear the words of this covenant, and speak to the men of Judah and to the inhabitants of Jerusalem;"

"Speak": Say to them, i.e. the men of Judah and the inhabitants of Jerusalem.

==== Verse 3 ====
and say to them, 'Thus says the Lord God of Israel: "Cursed is the man who does not obey the words of this covenant"'

"Cursed is the man who does not obey the words of this covenant": a citation from Deuteronomy 11:26–28; 27:26; 28:15–68, quoted by the apostle Paul in Galatians 3:10.

=== Verse 4 ===
which I commanded your fathers in the day I brought them out of the land of Egypt, from the iron furnace, saying, 'Obey My voice, and do according to all that I command you; so shall you be My people, and I will be your God,'

The entire future of the community in the land is dependent on the covenant with YHWH as the formula "I will be your God and you will be my people" (verse 4) is linked closely to "YHWH's oath to give them a land 'flowing with milk and honey'".

== The first lament (11:18–23) ==
This part records Jeremiah's first lament or 'confession' (could be in one combination with 12:1–6; cf. Jeremiah 15:1–21; Jeremiah 17:14–18; Jeremiah 18:18–23; Jeremiah 20:7–13) which will gain a divine response in the following part (Jeremiah 12:5–6). From the prose comments it is clear that Jeremiah is the speaker.

=== Verse 18 ===
Now the Lord gave me knowledge of it, and I know it; for You showed me their doings.

The Jerusalem Bible inserts verse 6 of chapter 12 immediately after this verse:

"Yes, even your own brothers and your own family play you false. Behind your back, they too criticise you openly. Put no reliance on them when they seem to be friendly".

=== Verse 20 ===
But, O Lord of Hosts, who judges righteously,

who tries the feelings and the heart,

let me see Your vengeance on them,

for to You I have revealed my cause.

- "The feelings" (KJV: "the reins"; NKJV: "the minds"): referring to "most secret parts", lit. "kidneys".

== In popular culture ==
- Verse 11 of this chapter, which reads: "Therefore thus saith the Lord, Behold, I will bring evil upon them, which they shall not be able to escape; and though they shall cry unto me, I will not hearken unto them." (KJV), is cited in the 2019 American horror movie Us, directed by Jordan Peele. Newslanes.com interprets the verse's use in the film as referring to the coming vengeance of the real Adelaide, also noting that it "mirrors itself like a doppelgänger".

== See also ==
- Anathoth
- Baal
- Egypt
- Israel
- Jeremiah
- Jerusalem
- Judah
- Related Bible parts: Deuteronomy 11, Deuteronomy 27, Deuteronomy 28, Galatians 3

== Sources ==
- Coogan, Michael David (2007). Coogan, Michael David; Brettler, Marc Zvi; Newsom, Carol Ann; Perkins, Pheme (eds.). The New Oxford Annotated Bible with the Apocryphal/Deuterocanonical Books: New Revised Standard Version, Issue 48 (Augmented 3rd ed.). Oxford University Press. ISBN 9780195288810.
- O'Connor, Kathleen M. (2007). "23. Jeremiah". In Barton, John; Muddiman, John (eds.). The Oxford Bible Commentary (first (paperback) ed.). Oxford University Press. pp. 487–533. ISBN 978-0199277186.
- Ulrich, Eugene, ed. (2010). The Biblical Qumran Scrolls: Transcriptions and Textual Variants. Brill. ISBN 9789004181830.
- Würthwein, Ernst (1995). The Text of the Old Testament. Translated by Rhodes, Erroll F. Grand Rapids, MI: Wm. B. Eerdmans. ISBN 0-8028-0788-7.
