= Jeremiah 12 =

Book of Jeremiah, chapter 12

- ← chapter 11 chapter 13 →
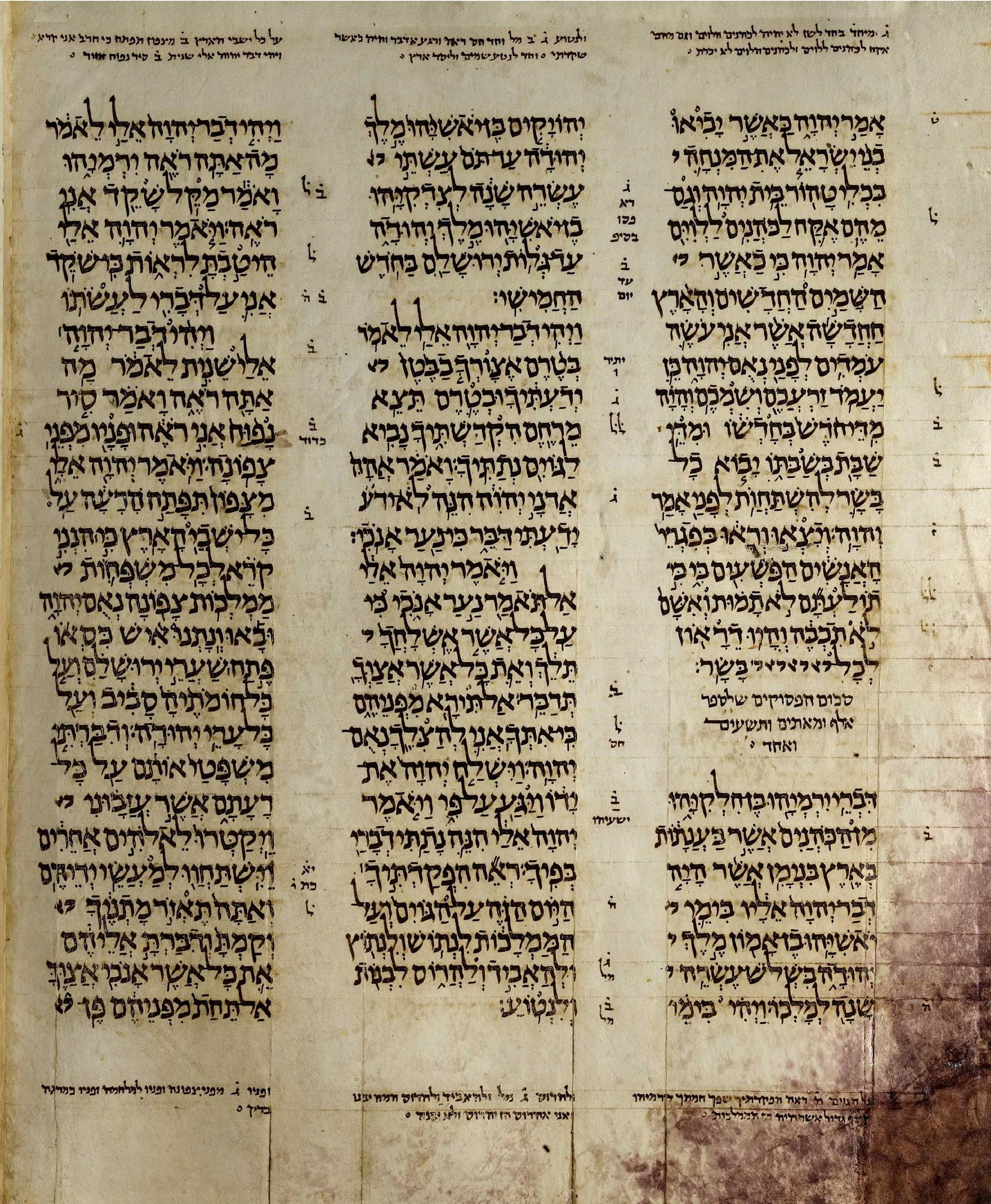
- A high resolution scan of the Aleppo Codex showing the Book of Jeremiah (the sixth book in Nevi'im).
- Book: Book of Jeremiah
- Hebrew Bible part: Nevi'im
- Order in the Hebrew part: 6
- Category: Latter Prophets
- Christian Bible part: Old Testament
- Order in the Christian part: 24

Jeremiah 12 is the twelfth chapter of the Book of Jeremiah in the Hebrew Bible or the Old Testament of the Christian Bible. This book contains prophecies attributed to the prophet Jeremiah, and is one of the Books of the Prophets. This chapter includes the first of the passages known as the "Confessions of Jeremiah" (Jeremiah 11:18–12:6).

== Text ==
The original text was written in Hebrew language. This chapter is divided into 17 verses.

=== Textual witnesses ===
Some early manuscripts containing the text of this chapter in Hebrew are of the Masoretic Text tradition, which includes the Codex Cairensis (895), the Petersburg Codex of the Prophets (916), Aleppo Codex (10th century), Codex Leningradensis (1008). Some fragments containing parts of this chapter were found among the Dead Sea Scrolls, i.e., 4QJer^{a} (4Q70; 225-175 BCE), with extant verses 3‑7, 13‑17.

There is also a translation into Koine Greek known as the Septuagint, made in the last few centuries BCE. Extant ancient manuscripts of the Septuagint version include Codex Vaticanus (B; $\mathfrak{G}$^{B}; 4th century), Codex Sinaiticus (S; BHK: $\mathfrak{G}$^{S}; 4th century), Codex Alexandrinus (A; $\mathfrak{G}$^{A}; 5th century) and Codex Marchalianus (Q; $\mathfrak{G}$^{Q}; 6th century).

== Parashot ==
The parashah sections listed here are based on the Aleppo Codex. Jeremiah 12 is a part of the Fifth prophecy (Jeremiah 11-13) in the section of Prophecies of Destruction (Jeremiah 1-25). {P}: open parashah; {S}: closed parashah.

{S} 12:1-3 {P} 12:4-6 {S} 12:7-12 {S} 12:13 {P} 12:14-17 {S}

== Jeremiah's lament (12:1–6) ==
This part records Jeremiah's lament or 'confession' (could be in one combination with 11:18–23; cf. Jeremiah 15:1–21; Jeremiah 17:14–18; Jeremiah 18:18–23; Jeremiah 20:7–13) which will gain a divine response in the following part (12:5–6). From the prose comments it is clear that Jeremiah is the speaker. These six verses uses the inversion of the images and themes from 11:18–23.

=== Verse 1 ===
Righteous are You, O Lord, when I plead with You;
Yet let me talk with You about Your judgments.
Why does the way of the wicked prosper?
Why are those happy who deal so treacherously?

The question "Why does the way of the wicked prosper?" is also a theme in Job 21; Psalm 37:1; Psalm 73:3, Habakkuk 1:4 and Malachi 3:15.

=== Verse 5 ===
If you have run with the footmen, and they have wearied you,
Then how can you contend with horses?

Possibly a proverbial expression.

=== Verse 6 ===
New King James Version:

For even your brothers, the house of your father,
Even they have dealt treacherously with you;
Yes, they have called a multitude after you.
Do not believe them,
Even though they speak smooth words to you.

Jerusalem Bible:

"Yes, even your own brothers and your own family play you false. Behind your back, they too criticise you openly. Put no reliance on them when they seem to be friendly".

The Jerusalem Bible inserts this verse immediately after verse 18 in chapter 11.

== YHWH's Lament (12:7–17) ==
In this part YHWH continues his previous reply to Jeremiah (12:5-6) with a lament, "first in a tone of exhausted grief, then of destructive rage", but ending with a look toward the future, in a hope for Israel to be returned to its inheritance.

== See also ==
- Israel
- Judah
- Related Bible parts: Psalm 37, Psalm 73, Malachi 3

== Sources ==
- Coogan, Michael David (2007). Coogan, Michael David; Brettler, Marc Zvi; Newsom, Carol Ann; Perkins, Pheme (eds.). The New Oxford Annotated Bible with the Apocryphal/Deuterocanonical Books: New Revised Standard Version, Issue 48 (Augmented 3rd ed.). Oxford University Press. ISBN 9780195288810.
- O'Connor, Kathleen M. (2007). "23. Jeremiah". In Barton, John; Muddiman, John (eds.). The Oxford Bible Commentary (first (paperback) ed.). Oxford University Press. pp. 487–533. ISBN 978-0199277186.
- Ulrich, Eugene, ed. (2010). The Biblical Qumran Scrolls: Transcriptions and Textual Variants. Brill. ISBN 9789004181830.
- Würthwein, Ernst (1995). The Text of the Old Testament. Translated by Rhodes, Erroll F. Grand Rapids, MI: Wm. B. Eerdmans. ISBN 0-8028-0788-7.
