= Jeremiah 5 =

Book of Jeremiah, chapter 5

- ← chapter 4 chapter 6 →
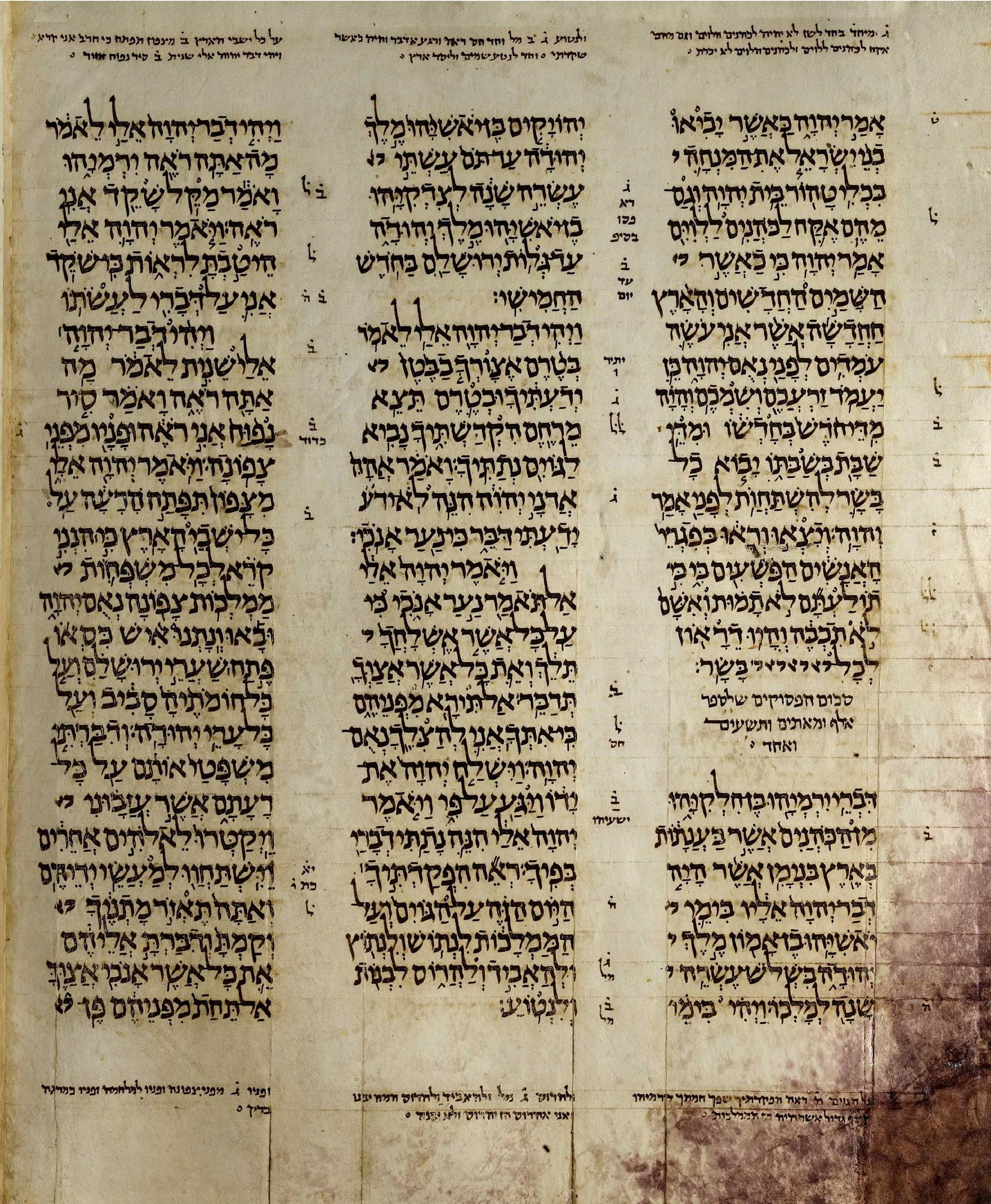
- A high resolution scan of the Aleppo Codex showing the Book of Jeremiah (the sixth book in Nevi'im).
- Book: Book of Jeremiah
- Hebrew Bible part: Nevi'im
- Order in the Hebrew part: 6
- Category: Latter Prophets
- Christian Bible part: Old Testament
- Order in the Christian part: 24

Jeremiah 5 is the fifth chapter of the Book of Jeremiah in the Hebrew Bible or the Old Testament of the Christian Bible. This book contains prophecies attributed to the prophet Jeremiah, and is one of the Books of the Prophets. Chapters 2 to 6 contain the earliest preaching of Jeremiah on the apostasy of Israel. This chapter is sub-titled "The Justice of God’s Judgment" in the New King James Version.

== Text ==
The original text of this chapter, as with the rest of the Book of Jeremiah, was written in Hebrew language. Since the division of the Bible into chapters and verses in the late medieval period, this chapter is divided into 31 verses.

=== Textual witnesses ===
Some early manuscripts containing the text of this chapter in Hebrew are of the Masoretic Text tradition, which includes the Codex Cairensis (895), the Petersburg Codex of the Prophets (916), Aleppo Codex (10th century), Codex Leningradensis (1008).

There is also a translation into Koine Greek known as the Septuagint, made in the last few centuries BCE. Extant ancient manuscripts of the Septuagint version include Codex Vaticanus (B; $\mathfrak{G}$^{B}; 4th century), Codex Sinaiticus (S; BHK: $\mathfrak{G}$^{S}; 4th century), Codex Alexandrinus (A; $\mathfrak{G}$^{A}; 5th century) and Codex Marchalianus (Q; $\mathfrak{G}$^{Q}; 6th century). Among the Chester Beatty Papyri (BHK: $\mathfrak{G}$^{Beatty}) are the fragments of Jeremiah (Rahlfs 966; Chester Beatty Library (CBL) BP VIII), dated from the late second century or early third century AD, containing Jeremiah 4:30–5:1; 5:9–13; 5:13–14; 5:23–24.

== Parashot ==
The parashah sections listed here are based on the Aleppo Codex. Jeremiah 5 is a part of the Third prophecy (Jeremiah 3:6-6:30) in the section of Prophecies of Destruction (Jeremiah 1-25). {P}: open parashah; {S}: closed parashah.

{S} 5:1-9 {S} 5:10-13 {S} 5:14-19 {P} 5:20-29 {S} 5:30-31 [6:1-5 {P}]

== Structure ==
A. W. Streane in the Cambridge Bible for Schools and Colleges organises this chapter as follows:

- Jeremiah 5:1-9: Even one righteous man would procure forgiveness. But moral obliquity and obstinacy in sin are universal among the enlightened no less than the ignorant. Retribution cannot but be the result.
- Jeremiah 5:10-19: The people have refused to credit the forecasts of the true prophets. Therefore, shall city and country alike be laid waste by a mighty nation of unknown tongue. Israel has chosen to serve foreign gods at home. Now she shall be compelled to serve foreign masters in exile.
- Jeremiah 5:20-29: They fear not Jehovah, who is absolute in His control of nature's forces, whether beneficent or destructive. By craft, like that of the fowler, who fills his cage with trapped birds, rich men lay up wealth at the expense of the needy and the orphan. Divine vengeance must ensue.
- Jeremiah 5:30-31: Prophets teach falsely, and support priestly rule. The people welcome this state of things. What shall the end be?

== Verse 1 ==
Run ye to and fro through the streets of Jerusalem,

and see now, and know,
and seek in the broad places thereof,

if ye can find a man,

if there be any that executeth judgment,
that seeketh the truth;

and I will pardon it.

"Run to and fro" is fitting for Jeremiah as a youth (Jeremiah 1:6) but other translations do not maintain this emphasis: “Go up and down the streets of Jerusalem (New International Version), Walk up and down the streets of Jerusalem (New Century Version). The Greek philosopher Diogenes similarly is said to have strolled about the city of Athens in full daylight with a lantern, "looking for an honest man".

== Verse 2 ==
And though they say, The LORD liveth; surely they swear falsely

The reading is "... therefore they swear falsely" in the Masoretic Text and the Lexham English Bible.

== Verse 15 ==
Lo, I will bring a nation upon you from far,

O house of Israel, saith the Lord:

it is a mighty nation, it is an ancient nation,

a nation whose language thou knowest not,
neither understandest what they say.

== Verse 31 ==
The prophets prophesy falsely,
And the priests rule by their own power;
And My people love to have it so.
But what will you do in the end?

A rhetorical question; alternatively, "But when the end comes, what will you do?" (New Jerusalem Bible). Greek: εις τα μετά ταύτα, eis ta meta tauta, literally "in the [times] after these things".

The prophet Isaiah also asks his hearers:

What will you do in the day of punishment,

And in the desolation which will come from afar?
To whom will you flee for help?

== See also ==
- Israel
- Jacob
- Judah
- Jerusalem
- Related Bible parts: Isaiah 9, Jeremiah 4

== Bibliography ==
- Würthwein, Ernst (1995). The Text of the Old Testament. Translated by Rhodes, Erroll F. Grand Rapids, MI: Wm. B. Eerdmans. ISBN 0-8028-0788-7.
