= Jeremiah 13 =

Book of Jeremiah, chapter 13

- ← chapter 12 chapter 14 →
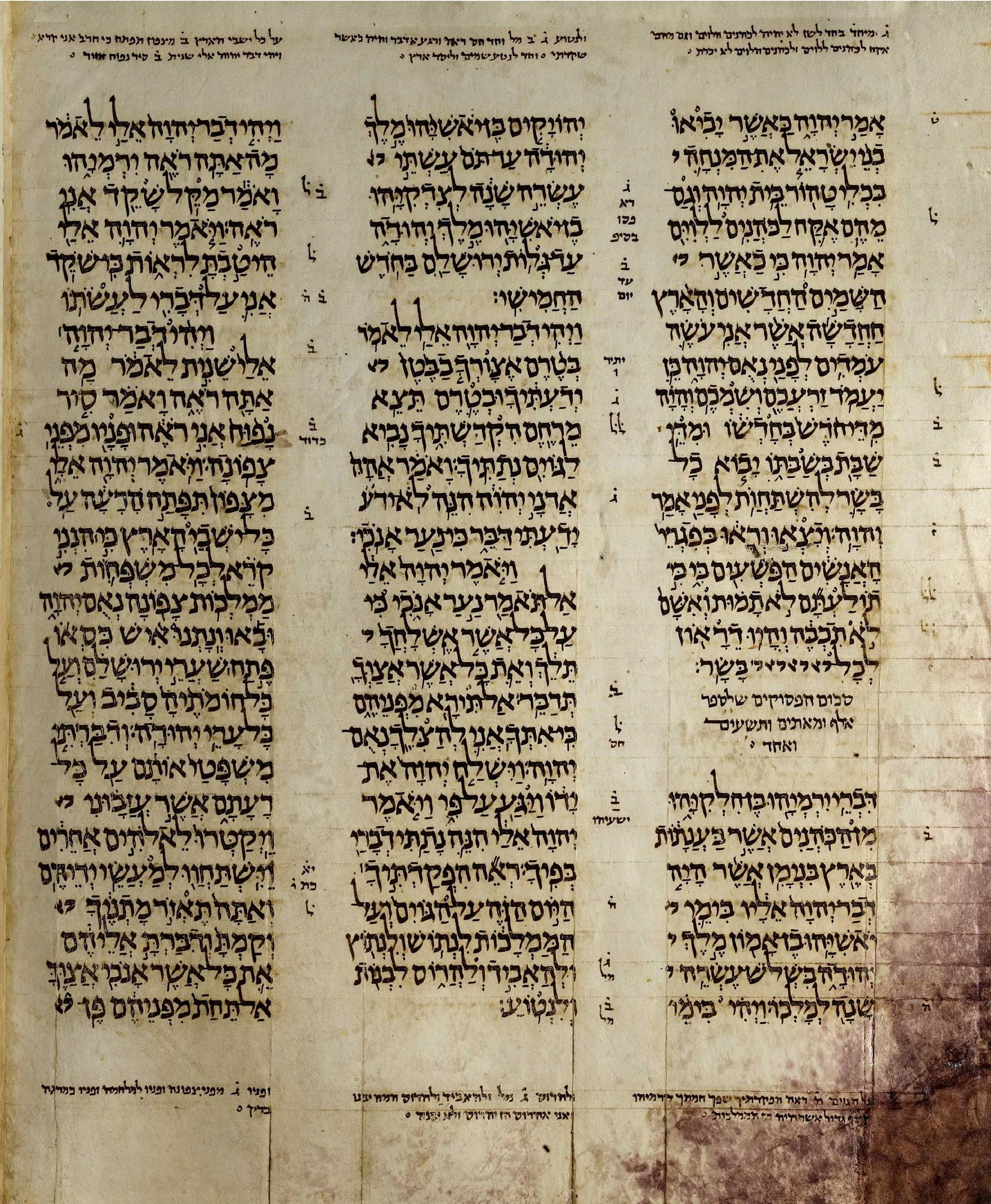
- A high resolution scan of the Aleppo Codex showing the Book of Jeremiah (the sixth book in Nevi'im).
- Book: Book of Jeremiah
- Hebrew Bible part: Nevi'im
- Order in the Hebrew part: 6
- Category: Latter Prophets
- Christian Bible part: Old Testament
- Order in the Christian part: 24

Jeremiah 13 is the thirteenth chapter of the Book of Jeremiah in the Hebrew Bible or the Old Testament of the Christian Bible. This book contains prophecies attributed to the prophet Jeremiah, and is one of the Books of the Prophets.

== Text ==
The original text was written in Hebrew language. This chapter is divided into 27 verses.

=== Textual witnesses ===
Some early manuscripts containing the text of this chapter in Hebrew are of the Masoretic Text tradition, which includes the Codex Cairensis (895), the Petersburg Codex of the Prophets (916), Aleppo Codex (10th century), Codex Leningradensis (1008). Some fragments containing parts of this chapter were found among the Dead Sea Scrolls, i.e., 4QJer^{a} (4Q70; 225-175 BCE) with extant verses 1–7, 22-23? [or 22:3], 27, and 2QJer (2Q13; 1st century CE) with the extant verse 22.

There is also a translation into Koine Greek known as the Septuagint, made in the last few centuries BCE. Extant ancient manuscripts of the Septuagint version include Codex Vaticanus (B; $\mathfrak{G}$^{B}; 4th century), Codex Sinaiticus (S; BHK: $\mathfrak{G}$^{S}; 4th century), Codex Alexandrinus (A; $\mathfrak{G}$^{A}; 5th century) and Codex Marchalianus (Q; $\mathfrak{G}$^{Q}; 6th century).

== Parashot ==
The parashah sections listed here are based on the Aleppo Codex. Jeremiah 13 is a part of the Fifth prophecy (Jeremiah 11-13) in the section of Prophecies of Destruction (Jeremiah 1-25). {P}: open parashah; {S}: closed parashah.

{S} 13:1-2 {P} 13:3-7 {P} 13:8-10 {S} 13:11-12a {S} 13:12b-17 כה אמר {S} 13:18-19 {S} 13:20-27 {S}

== Verses 1-11 ==
The "acted symbol of the linen girdle".

=== Verse 11 ===
'For as the sash clings to the waist of a man, so I have caused the whole house of Israel and the whole house of Judah to cling to Me,' says the Lord, 'that they may become My people, for renown, for praise, and for glory; but they would not hear.'

"Sash", from Hebrew: אזור (’ê-zōr): a belt, girdle, waistband, loincloth, waist cloth, girdle of loin. This loincloth is made of linen, associated with priestly wear (Exodus 28:42).

== Verses 12-14 ==
The "spoken symbol of the bottles".

== Verse 18 ==
Say to the king and to the queen mother,

“Humble yourselves;
Sit down,
For your rule shall collapse, the crown of your glory.

The king and queen mother were probably Jehoiachin and Nehushta, respectively. Commentator A. W. Streane refers to a minority view held by Karl Heinrich Graf and other biblical commentators, who suggested they were the earlier king Jehoiakim and Zebidah the queen mother.

== See also ==
- David
- Ethiopia
- Israel
- Jerusalem
- Judah
- Linen
- Related Bible parts: Exodus 28; Leviticus 16; Ezekiel 36; Zechariah 3

== Bibliography ==
- Brown, Francis; Driver, S. R.; Briggs, Charles A. (1907). The Brown-Driver-Briggs Hebrew and English Lexicon (1962 reprint ed.). Oxford University Press. Reprinted with Corrections in 1962.
- Ulrich, Eugene, ed. (2010). The Biblical Qumran Scrolls: Transcriptions and Textual Variants. Brill.
- Würthwein, Ernst (1995). The Text of the Old Testament. Translated by Rhodes, Erroll F. Grand Rapids, MI: Wm. B. Eerdmans. ISBN 0-8028-0788-7.
