= Zechariah 7 =

Bible chapter

- ← chapter 6 chapter 8 →
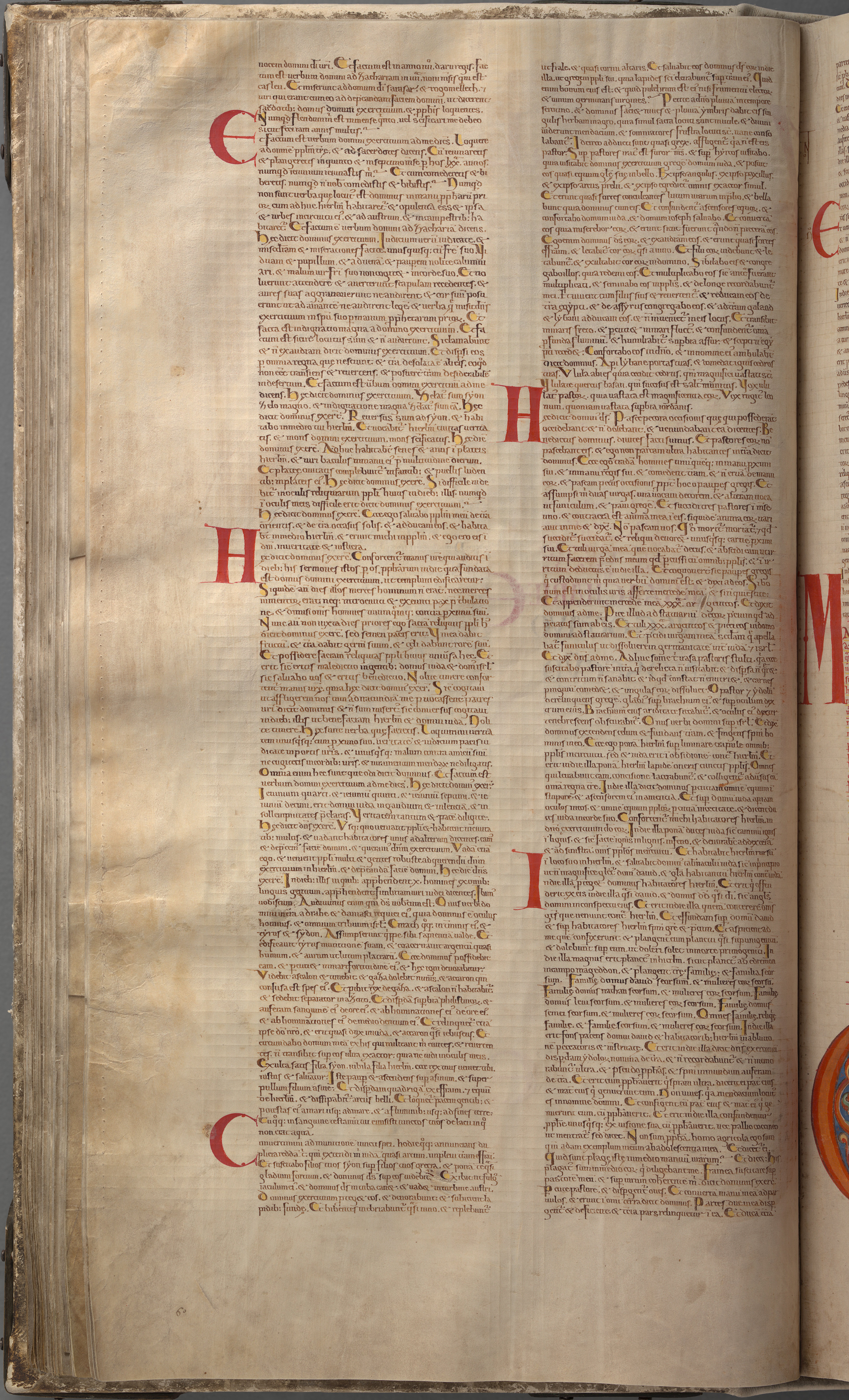
- Book of Zechariah (6:15-13:9) in Latin in Codex Gigas, made around 13th century.
- Book: Book of Zechariah
- Category: Nevi'im
- Christian Bible part: Old Testament
- Order in the Christian part: 38

Zechariah 7 is the seventh of the 14 chapters in the Book of Zechariah in the Hebrew Bible or the Old Testament of the Christian Bible. This book contains the prophecies attributed to the prophet Zechariah. In the Hebrew Bible it is part of the Book of the Twelve Minor Prophets. This chapter is a part of a section (so-called "First Zechariah") consisting of Zechariah 1–8. The Jews having sent to inquire concerning the set fasts, Zechariah 7:1-3, Zechariah reproves the hypocrisy of their fasts, Zechariah 7:4-7, and they are exhorted by repentance to remove the cause of their calamity, Zechariah 7:8-14.

== Text ==
The original text was written in the Hebrew language. This chapter is divided into 14 verses.

=== Textual witnesses ===
Some early manuscripts containing the text of this chapter in Hebrew are of the Masoretic Text, which includes the Codex Cairensis (from year 895), the Petersburg Codex of the Prophets (916), and Codex Leningradensis (1008). (Note: The Aleppo Codex (930) now only contains Zechariah 9:17b–14:21.)

There is also a translation into Koine Greek known as the Septuagint, made in the last few centuries BCE. Extant ancient manuscripts of the Septuagint version include Codex Vaticanus (B; $\mathfrak{G}$^{B}; 4th century), Codex Sinaiticus (S; BHK: $\mathfrak{G}$^{S}; 4th century), Codex Alexandrinus (A; $\mathfrak{G}$^{A}; 5th century) and Codex Marchalianus (Q; $\mathfrak{G}$^{Q}; 6th century).

== Obedience better than fasting (verses 1–7) ==
With the completion of the new temple in Jerusalem a question arises whether the fast of the fifth month, commemorating the destruction of the first temple, is still necessary. The answer (verses 4—7, amplified in verses 8—14) is negative and sweeps in the fast of the seventh month also (verse 5), but more likely it means that, in the ideal world envisaged by the prophet, fasting is seen as punishment, so it should no longer be necessary.

=== Verse 1 ===
And it came to pass in the fourth year of king Darius,

that the word of the Lord came unto Zechariah

in the fourth day of the ninth month, even in Chisleu;

- " In the fourth year of King Darius": This happened in 518 BCE, nearly two years after the visions had occurred (Zechariah 1:7) and after the foundation of the temple was laid (Haggai 2:10). In two years more the temple was finished (Ezra 6:15), and the work of rebuilding was now proceeding vigorously; it seemed a fit opportunity for inquiring whether, in this period of comparative prosperity and success, it behoved the people to continue the fast appointed in sadder times.
- "Chisleu" or "Chislev" (Nehemiah 1:1). This month corresponded to mid-November until mid-December in the Gregorian calendar. The word "Chisleu" means "torpidity," the state in which nature is in November, answering to this month.

=== Verse 2 ===
When they had sent unto the house of God Sherezer and Regemmelech, and their men, to pray before the Lord,

==== Verse 2 in Hebrew ====
Masoretic Text:

וישלח בית־אל שר־אצר ורגם מלך ואנשיו לחלות את־פני יהוה׃

Transliteration:

wa-yish-lakh bêṯ-'êl shar-'e-tser wə-re-ḡem-me-leḵ wa-'ă-nā-šāw; lə-khal-lō-wṯ 'eṯ-pə-nê Yah-weh.

Literal translation:

and sent Bethel Sharezer and Regemmelech and their men to entreat the face of the Lord.

==== Verse 2 notes ====
- "When they held sent unto the house of God": could be better rendered as "and Bethel sent" or "and the inhabitants of Bethel sent", because in the Hebrew order of the words, naturally the subject is 'Bethel'. In the Hebrew Bible "the house of God" is never called "Bethel", as Bethel is always a place name, whereas "the house of God" is designated by historians, Psalmists, and prophets by the name "Beth-elohim," or more commonly "Beth-ha-elohim", which are also used by Zechariah and Haggai. It is not likely that the name "Beth-el" should have first been given to the house of God, when it had been desecrated by the idolatries of Jeroboam. There is also no reason to send people to Bethel to seek an answer from God, and even more unlikely to say that they sent to Bethel, in order that those at Bethel should send to Jerusalem. Bethel, in Nehemiah's time Nehemiah 11:31, was one of the chief places of Benjamin. "Two hundred twenty and three of the men of Bethel and Ai" (Ezra 2:28) had returned from exile with Zerubbabel. The answer is given to "the people" of the land, so the enquirers are not those still in Babylon. Although put as matter of religion, the answer shows that the question was not religious. It is remarkable that, whereas in the case of those who brought presents from Babylon, the names express some relation to God, these names are singularly, the one of a parricide son of Sennacherib, "Sharezer" Isaiah 37:38; 2 Kings 19:37, and of one, chief among the King of Babylon's princes; the other probably a secular name, "Regem-melech", "the king's friend".
- "To pray before the Lord": or "to entreat the face of the Lord"; in order to be directed to a proper answer for the question they came with and the temple at Jerusalem was the place where men used to go up to pray (cf. Luke 18:10).

=== Verse 3 ===
And to speak unto the priests which were in the house of the Lord of hosts, and to the prophets, saying, Should I weep in the fifth month, separating myself, as I have done these so many years?

- "And to speak unto the priests which were in the house of the Lord of hosts": Those ministered in the sanctuary, as the Targum explains it, "who offered sacrifices, etc. and who were to be consulted in matters of religion", Malachi 2:7.
- "And to the prophets": who were then in being, as Haggai, Zechariah and Malachi.
- "Should I weep in the fifth month?" The use of the first person singular to express a community or a people is not uncommon; here it means the Bethelites (compare Numbers 20:18, 19; Joshua 9:7; 1 Samuel 5:10, 11). Weeping is the accompaniment of fasting (Judges 20:26; Nehemiah 1:4; Joel 2:12). This fast in the fifth month, the month of Ab, had been established in memory of the destruction of Jerusalem by Nebuchadnezzar. The temple was burnt on the ninth or tenth of the month (see 2 Kings 25:8, 9; Jeremiah 52:12, 13). The only fast-day enjoined by the Law of Moses was the great Day of Atonement on the tenth day of the seventh month, Ethanim (Leviticus 23:26, etc.). But the Jews added others in memory of certain national events (see Judges 20:26; 1 Samuel 7:6; Isaiah 58:3, etc.). In Zechariah 8:19 mention is made of four extraordinary fasts instituted and observed during the Captivity, viz. on the ninth day of the fourth month, in memory of the capture of Jerusalem by the Chaldeans; in the fifth month, in remembrance of the burning of the temple and city; in the seventh month, in consequence of the murder of Gedaliah (Jeremiah 41:1–2); and in the tenth month, in memory of the commencement of the siege of Jerusalem by Nebuchadnezzar.

=== Verse 5 ===
Speak unto all the people of the land, and to the priests, saying, When ye fasted and mourned in the fifth and seventh month, even those seventy years, did ye at all fast unto me, even to me?

- "Fifth month" The original question in Zechariah 7:3 referred only to this fast; the answer embraces also another fast in seventh month appointed by human authority.
- "The seventh month": This fast was instituted in consequence of the murder of Gedaliah, B.C. 587, just seventy years ago, when the greater part of the remnant of the Jews, contrary to the prophet's warning, fled into Egypt to escape the punishment of the crime (2 Kings 25:25, 26; Jeremiah 41:2, 16, etc.).
- "Did ye at all fast unto me, even to me?" The fast they kept was not according to the command of God, but an appointment of theirs; nor was it directed to his glory; nor was it any profit or advantage to him; and therefore it was nothing to him whether they fasted or not; see Isaiah 58:3.
- "Seventy years" (also Zechariah 1:12) refers to the fulfilled Jeremiah's prophecy of exile (Jeremiah 25:12, Jeremiah 29:10) which is also cited by Daniel (Daniel 9:2).

== Disobedience resulted in captivity (verses 8–14) ==
This section contains an oracle "warning against repeating the sins of preexilic generations who ignored the teaching of the prophets" (cf. Zechariah 1:1–6; 8:14–17).

=== Verse 12 ===
Yea, they made their hearts as an adamant stone, lest they should hear the law, and the words which the Lord of hosts hath sent in his spirit by the former prophets: therefore came a great wrath from the Lord of hosts.

- "Adamant stone": translated from Hebrew שמיר, shā-mîr, probably means "diamond," a very hard stone, which, according to Jerome, can 'break all metals to pieces, but to be itself broken by none'; so it is called adamas, "unconquerable".

== See also ==
- Bethel
- Darius
- Fast of Gedalia
- Hebrew calendar: Ab (5th month), Tishrei (7th month), Chisleu (9th month)
- Negev
- Shfela
- Tisha B'Av
- Yom Kippur (Day of Atonement)
- Related Bible parts: Nehemiah 1, Isaiah 58, Jeremiah 1, Jeremiah 25, Jeremiah 29, Daniel 9

== Sources ==
- Boda, Mark J. (2016). Harrison, R. K.; Hubbard, Jr, Robert L. (eds.). The Book of Zechariah. New International Commentary on the Old Testament. Wm. B. Eerdmans Publishing. ISBN 978-0802823755.
- Collins, John J. (2014). Introduction to the Hebrew Scriptures. Fortress Press. ISBN 9781451469233.
- Coogan, Michael David (2007). Coogan, Michael David; Brettler, Marc Zvi; Newsom, Carol Ann; Perkins, Pheme (eds.). The New Oxford Annotated Bible with the Apocryphal/Deuterocanonical Books: New Revised Standard Version, Issue 48 (Augmented 3rd ed.). Oxford University Press. ISBN 9780195288810.
- Hayes, Christine (2015). Introduction to the Bible. Yale University Press. ISBN 978-0300188271.
- Larkin, Katrina J. A. (2007). "37. Zechariah". In Barton, John; Muddiman, John (eds.). The Oxford Bible Commentary (first (paperback) ed.). Oxford University Press. pp. 610–615. ISBN 978-0199277186.
- Mason, Rex (1993). "Zechariah, The Book of.". In Metzger, Bruce M; Coogan, Michael D (eds.). The Oxford Companion to the Bible. Oxford University Press. ISBN 978-0195046458.
- Würthwein, Ernst (1995). The Text of the Old Testament. Translated by Rhodes, Erroll F. Grand Rapids, MI: Wm. B. Eerdmans. ISBN 0-8028-0788-7.
