= Jeremiah 6 =

Book of Jeremiah, chapter 6

- ← chapter 5 chapter 7 →
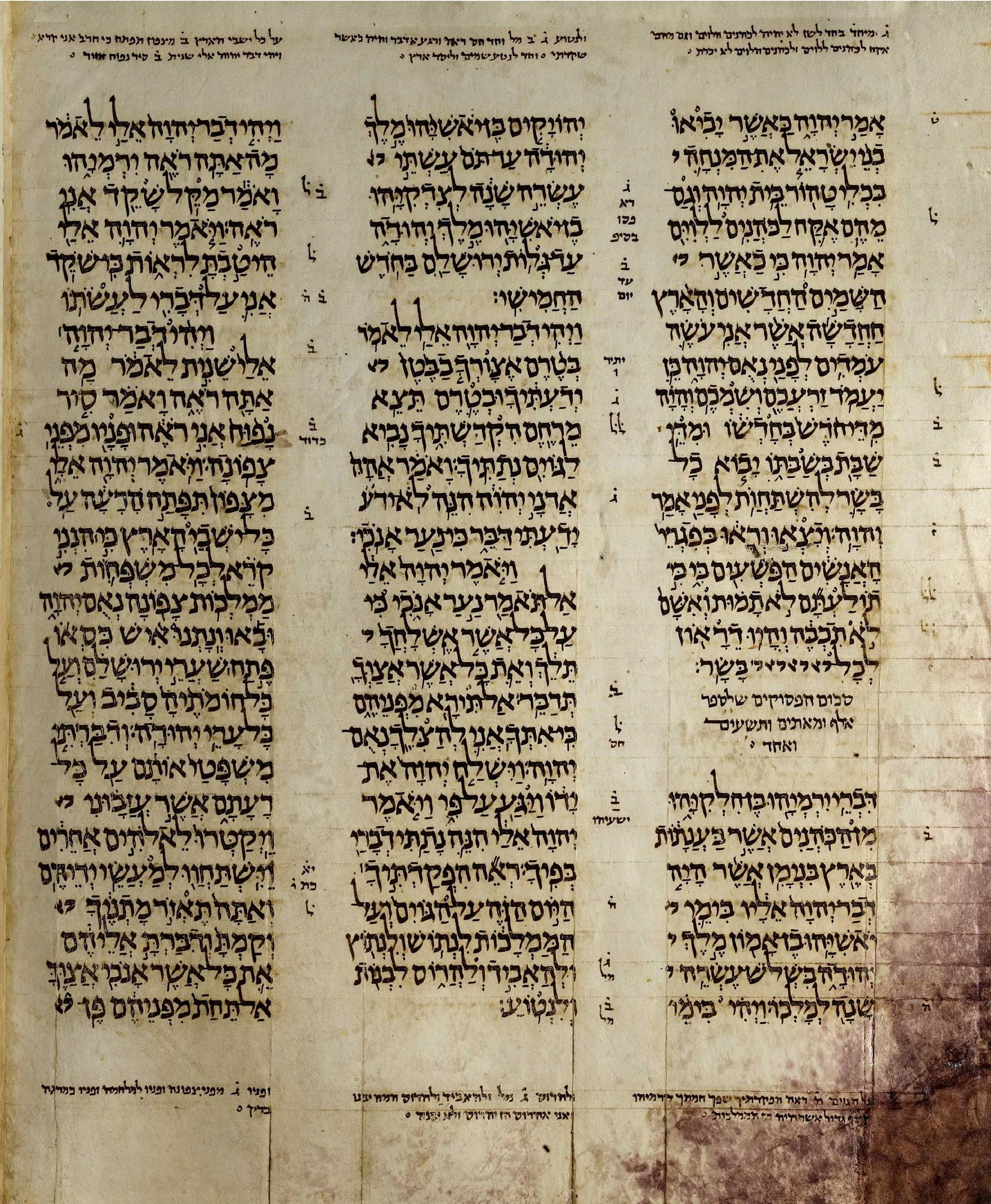
- A high resolution scan of the Aleppo Codex showing the Book of Jeremiah (the sixth book in Nevi'im).
- Book: Book of Jeremiah
- Hebrew Bible part: Nevi'im
- Order in the Hebrew part: 6
- Category: Latter Prophets
- Christian Bible part: Old Testament
- Order in the Christian part: 24

Jeremiah 6 is the sixth chapter of the Book of Jeremiah in the Hebrew Bible or the Old Testament of the Christian Bible. This book contains prophecies attributed to the prophet Jeremiah, and is one of the Books of the Prophets. Chapters 2 to 6 contain the earliest preaching of Jeremiah on the apostasy of Israel. This chapter relates Jeremiah's warning of "impending destruction from the North".

== Text ==
The original text of this chapter, as with the rest of the Book of Jeremiah, was written in Hebrew language. Since the division of the Bible into chapters and verses in the late medieval period, this chapter is divided into 30 verses.

=== Textual witnesses ===
Some early manuscripts containing the text of this chapter in Hebrew are of the Masoretic Text tradition, which includes the Codex Cairensis (895), the Petersburg Codex of the Prophets (916), Aleppo Codex (10th century), Codex Leningradensis (1008). Some fragments possibly containing parts of this chapter were found among the Dead Sea Scrolls, i.e., 4QJer^{a} (4Q70; 225-175 BCE), with the extant verse 30.

There is also a translation into Koine Greek known as the Septuagint, made in the last few centuries BCE. Extant ancient manuscripts of the Septuagint version include Codex Vaticanus (B; $\mathfrak{G}$^{B}; 4th century), Codex Sinaiticus (S; BHK: $\mathfrak{G}$^{S}; 4th century), Codex Alexandrinus (A; $\mathfrak{G}$^{A}; 5th century) and Codex Marchalianus (Q; $\mathfrak{G}$^{Q}; 6th century).

== Parashot ==
The parashah sections listed here are based on the Aleppo Codex. Jeremiah 6 is a part of the Third prophecy (Jeremiah 3:6-6:30) in the section of Prophecies of Destruction (Jeremiah 1-25). {P}: open parashah; {S}: closed parashah.

[{S} 5:30-31] 6:1-5 {P} 6:6-8 {P} 6:9-15 {S} 6:16-21 {P} 6:22-30 {P}

== The wages of sin (6:1–15) ==
Whereas the whole chapter 6 functions as a massive announcement of Judah's 'final outcome' for the reasons of destruction identified in chapter 5, this section and the last section of the chapter (6:22–30) are closely matched to form 'literary amalgamations' bracketing the single complex unit in the middle (6:16–21).

=== Verse 1 ===
O ye children of Benjamin,

gather yourselves to flee out of the midst of Jerusalem,

and blow the trumpet in Tekoa,

and set up a sign of fire in Bethhaccerem:

for evil appeareth out of the north,

and great destruction.

Tekoa (Tuqu') was about 5 miles (8.0 km) south of Bethlehem in the hill country of Judah. The location of Bethhaccerem is debated. Jerusalem was in the territory allocated to the tribe of Benjamin.

=== Verse 7 ===
As a fountain casts out her waters,

so she casts out her wickedness.

Violence and devastation are heard in her;

before Me continually are grief and wounds.

The first sentence in Hebrew can be rendered as "As a well makes cool/fresh its water, she makes cool/fresh her wickedness," with the word "well" written (kethib) in an unusual form (בּוֹר, bor, "cistern", a masculine noun), but the reading proposed by the Masoretes (qere) is בַּיִר, bayir, for בְּאֵר, beʾer, "well", a feminine noun, which agrees in gender with the pronoun ('it also forms a more appropriate comparison since cisterns do not hold fresh water').

A marginal note in the Masoretic Text tradition indicates that the middle letter of the Tanakh (the whole Hebrew Bible) resides within this verse.

== Road closed ahead (6:16–21) ==
This section contains 'the message of the grounds and the announcement of disaster', reinforced by 'the initial quotation formulas in verses 16 and 21. Some terms found in the first section (6:1–15) recur clustered in verses 18–19, such as 'a bad fate' (verse 1), terms of warning or listening, as well as the "message(s)" from YHWH (verse 10).

=== Verse 20 ===
To what purpose cometh there to me incense from Sheba,

and the sweet cane from a far country?

your burnt offerings are not acceptable,

nor your sacrifices sweet unto me.

Despite 'rich liturgical offerings' that simply show their duplicity, the people 'bring the verdict upon themselves'. Although the frankincense from the Sabeans in South Arabia is a prescribed ingredient for incense (Exodus 30:34–38) and the sweet cane ("aromatic grasses") an ingredient for the anointing oil (Exodus 30:23), it is later explained in Jeremiah 7:21–24 that the use of those for worship can only work when 'meshed with a more broadly based journey through life' (cf. 1 Samuel 15:22).

== Consequences of failing the test (6:22–31) ==
Following a pattern in first section (6:1–5) this section describes the eventual disaster because the people failed the test of purity, metaphorically described as the analytical testing of metallic purity.

=== Verse 23 ===
They shall lay hold on bow and spear;

they are cruel, and have no mercy;

their voice roareth like the sea;

and they ride upon horses,

set in array as men for war against thee,

O daughter of Zion.

Here, the voice of YHWH warns about the approaching foe, a 'merciless military force crossing the earth', with a sound like 'the roaring sea' (v. 23b), and their target is 'you, O daughter Zion!' (verse 23c).

== See also ==
- Benjamin
- Bethhaccerem
- Israel
- Judah
- Jerusalem
- Sheba
- Tekoa
- Zion
- Related Bible parts: Exodus 30, Joshua 15, Joshua 18, Jeremiah 1, Jeremiah 5, Joel 3, Amos 1

== Sources ==
- Allen, Leslie C. (2008). Jeremiah: A Commentary. Westminster John Knox Press. ISBN 9780664222239.
- Huey, F. B. (1993). The New American Commentary - Jeremiah, Lamentations: An Exegetical and Theological Exposition of Holy Scripture, NIV Text. B&H Publishing Group. ISBN 9780805401165.
- Ofer, Yosef (1992). "The Aleppo Codex and the Bible of R. Shalom Shachna Yellin" in Rabbi Mordechai Breuer Festschrift: Collected Papers in Jewish Studies, ed. M. Bar-Asher, 1:295-353. Jerusalem (in Hebrew). Online text (PDF)
- O'Connor, Kathleen M. (2007). "23. Jeremiah". In Barton, John; Muddiman, John (eds.). The Oxford Bible Commentary (first (paperback) ed.). Oxford University Press. pp. 487–533. ISBN 978-0199277186.
- Thompson, J. A. (1980). A Book of Jeremiah. The New International Commentary on the Old Testament (illustrated, revised ed.). Wm. B. Eerdmans Publishing. ISBN 9780802825308.
- Würthwein, Ernst (1995). The Text of the Old Testament. Translated by Rhodes, Erroll F. Grand Rapids, MI: Wm. B. Eerdmans. ISBN 0-8028-0788-7.
