= Jeremiah 3 =

Book of Jeremiah, chapter 3

- ← chapter 2 chapter 4 →
- A double version of Jeremiah in Hebrew and Aramaic, written by Benayah ben Sa'adyah ben Zekharyah ben Margaz (scribe) in Yemen (1475).
- Book: Book of Jeremiah
- Hebrew Bible part: Nevi'im
- Order in the Hebrew part: 6
- Category: Latter Prophets
- Christian Bible part: Old Testament
- Order in the Christian part: 24

Jeremiah 3 is the third chapter of the Book of Jeremiah in the Hebrew Bible or the Old Testament of the Christian Bible. This book contains prophecies attributed to the prophet Jeremiah, and is one of the Books of the Prophets. Chapters 2 to 6 contain the earliest preaching of Jeremiah on the apostasy of Israel. Verses 2:1-3:5 dramatize the ending of a "marriage" between Yahweh and Israel, whereas verses 3:6-4:2 describe "the aftermath of recrimination" and partial restoration.

== Text ==
The original text of this chapter, as with the rest of the Book of Jeremiah, was written in Hebrew language. Since the division of the Bible into chapters and verses in the late medieval period, this chapter is divided into 25 verses.

=== Textual witnesses ===
Some early manuscripts containing the text of this chapter in Hebrew are of the Masoretic Text tradition, which includes the Codex Cairensis (895), the Petersburg Codex of the Prophets (916), Aleppo Codex (10th century), Codex Leningradensis (1008).

There is also a translation into Koine Greek known as the Septuagint, made in the last few centuries BCE. Extant ancient manuscripts of the Septuagint version include Codex Vaticanus (B; $\mathfrak{G}$^{B}; 4th century), Codex Sinaiticus (S; BHK: $\mathfrak{G}$^{S}; 4th century), Codex Alexandrinus (A; $\mathfrak{G}$^{A}; 5th century) and Codex Marchalianus (Q; $\mathfrak{G}$^{Q}; 6th century).

== Parashot ==
The parashah sections listed here are based on the Aleppo Codex. Jeremiah 3:1-5 is a part of the Second prophecy (Jeremiah 2:1-3:5), whereas Jeremiah 3:6-25 is a part of the Third prophecy (Jeremiah 3:6-6:30); both are in the section of Prophecies of Destruction (Jeremiah 1-25). {P}: open parashah; {S}: closed parashah.

[{S} 2:29-37] 3:1-5 {P} 3:6-10 {S} 3:11-17 {S} 3:18-25 {S}

== Structure ==
Verses 1–5 continue Jeremiah's first prophecy, commenced in chapter 2. Verses 6–18 may be considered as a separate prophecy, the first prophecy then resuming with verse 19.

== Wages of apostasy (3:1–5) ==
=== Verse 1 ===
They say,

If a man put away his wife, and she go from him, and become another man's,
shall he return unto her again? shall not that land be greatly polluted?

but thou hast played the harlot with many lovers;
yet return again to me,

saith the Lord.

The part following "They say" refers to Deuteronomy 24:1–14 which forbids a man who divorced his wife to remarry her if she had married another man, even when she becomes a widow or is divorced by the second husband.

=== Verse 3 ===
Therefore the showers have been withheld,
And there has been no latter rain.
You have had a harlot’s forehead;
You refuse to be ashamed.

Jeremiah's thoughts are strongly connected with Deuteronomy 11:13–14:

And it shall be that if you earnestly obey My commandments which I command you today, to love the Lord your God and serve Him with all your heart and with all your soul, then I will give you the rain for your land in its season, the early rain and the latter rain.

The Septuagint text is completely different:

And thou didst retain many shepherds for a stumbling-block to thyself: thou hadst a whore's face, thou didst become shameless toward all.

== A call to repentance (3:6–25) ==
=== Verse 12 ===
Go and proclaim these words toward the north, and say:

'Return, backsliding Israel,' says the Lord;
'I will not cause My anger to fall on you.
For I am merciful,' says the Lord;
'I will not remain angry forever.'

The phrase "Return, backsliding" (שׁ֣וּבָה מְשֻׁבָ֤ה, shubah meshubah) is a play of two words from the same root shub ("to turn"), that the "backslider" ("turn away") is invited to "return" ("turn back") without getting the anger of Yahweh, because He is merciful.

=== Verse 23 ===
Truly in vain is salvation hoped for from the hills,

and from the multitude of mountains:

truly in the Lord our God is the salvation of Israel.

The Masoretic text reads:

אכן לשקר מגבעות המון הרים
אכן ביהוה אלהינו תשועת ישראל׃

Transliteration:

’ā-ḵên la-she-qer mi-gə-ḇā-‘ō-wṯ hā-mōn hā-rîm;
’ā-ḵên Yah-weh ’ĕ-lō-hê-nū, tə-šū-‘aṯ yiś-rā-’êl.

The repentance should start with the confession that the "hills" and "mountains" give false hope, but the salvation of Israel can only be found in Yahweh, as Israel's only God.

== See also ==
- Israel
- Judah
- Jerusalem
- Zion
- Related Bible parts: Deuteronomy 24, Psalm 121, Jeremiah 1, Jeremiah 2

== Sources ==
- O'Connor, Kathleen M. (2007). "23. Jeremiah". In Barton, John; Muddiman, John (eds.). The Oxford Bible Commentary (first (paperback) ed.). Oxford University Press. pp. 487–533. ISBN 978-0199277186.
- Thompson, J. A. (1980). A Book of Jeremiah. The New International Commentary on the Old Testament (illustrated, revised ed.). Wm. B. Eerdmans Publishing. ISBN 9780802825308.
- Würthwein, Ernst (1995). The Text of the Old Testament. Translated by Rhodes, Erroll F. Grand Rapids, MI: Wm. B. Eerdmans. ISBN 0-8028-0788-7.
