= Jeremiah 7 =

Book of Jeremiah, chapter 7

- ← chapter 6 chapter 8 →
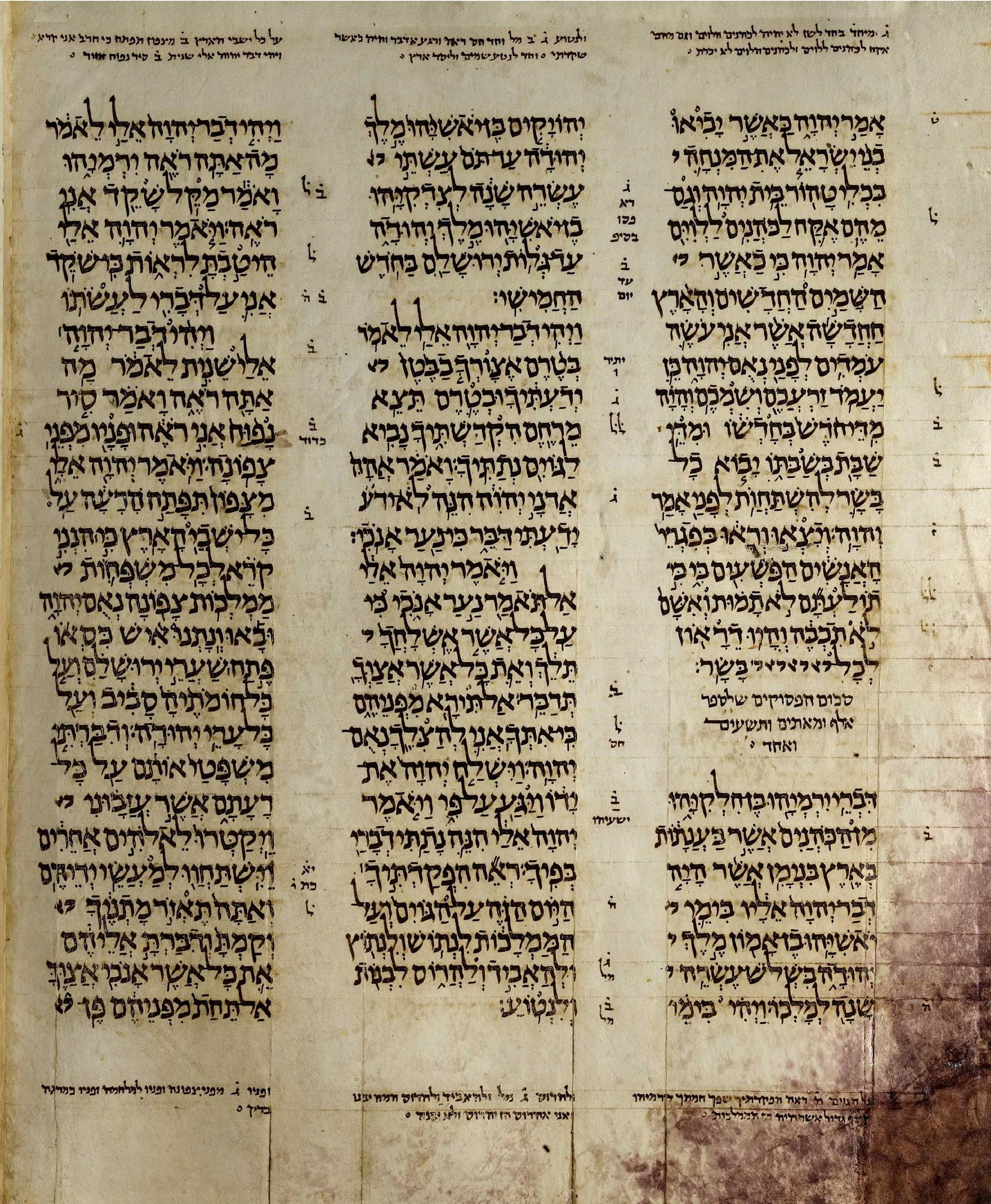
- A high resolution scan of the Aleppo Codex showing the Book of Jeremiah (the sixth book in Nevi'im).
- Book: Book of Jeremiah
- Hebrew Bible part: Nevi'im
- Order in the Hebrew part: 6
- Category: Latter Prophets
- Christian Bible part: Old Testament
- Order in the Christian part: 24

Jeremiah 7 is the seventh chapter of the Book of Jeremiah in the Hebrew Bible or the Old Testament of the Christian Bible. This book contains prophecies attributed to the prophet Jeremiah, and is one of the Books of the Prophets. Chapters 7 to 10 constitute an address delivered by Jeremiah at the gate of the Temple in Jerusalem.

== Text ==
The original text of this chapter, as with the rest of the Book of Jeremiah, was written in Hebrew language. Since the division of the Bible into chapters and verses in the late medieval period, this chapter is divided into 34 verses.

=== Textual witnesses ===
Some early manuscripts containing the text of this chapter in Hebrew are of the Masoretic Text tradition, which includes the Codex Cairensis (895), the Petersburg Codex of the Prophets (916), Aleppo Codex (10th century), Codex Leningradensis (1008). Some fragments containing parts of this chapter were found among the Dead Sea Scrolls, i.e., 4QJer^{a} (4Q70; 225-175 BCE), with extant verses 1-2, 15‑19, 28‑34.

There is also a translation into Koine Greek known as the Septuagint, made in the last few centuries BCE. Extant ancient manuscripts of the Septuagint version include Codex Vaticanus (B; $\mathfrak{G}$^{B}; 4th century), Codex Sinaiticus (S; BHK: $\mathfrak{G}$^{S}; 4th century), Codex Alexandrinus (A; $\mathfrak{G}$^{A}; 5th century) and Codex Marchalianus (Q; $\mathfrak{G}$^{Q}; 6th century).

== Parashot ==
The parashah sections listed here are based on the Aleppo Codex. Jeremiah 7 is a part of the Fourth prophecy (Jeremiah 7-10) in the section of Prophecies of Destruction (Jeremiah 1-25). {P}: open parashah; {S}: closed parashah.

{P} 7:1-2 {S} 7:3-15 {P} 7:16-20 {P} 7:21-28 {S} 7:29-31 {P} 7:32-34 [8:1-3 {S}]

== Context ==
Chapters 7 to 10 are brought together "because of their common concern with religious observance". Streane, in the Cambridge Bible for Schools and Colleges, dates Jeremiah's address to the beginning of the reign of King Jehoiakim (608–7 BC), because Jeremiah 26:1's very similar wording, "Stand in the court of the Lord’s house, and speak to all the cities of Judah, which come to worship in the Lord’s house" expressly dates this address to "the beginning of the reign of Jehoiakim the son of Josiah, king of Judah". However, Streane also notes that theologians Julius Wellhausen and Marti both place it as early as "the crisis brought about by the death of Josiah at Megiddo", before Jehoiakim's accession.

== Verse 9 ==
Will ye steal, murder, and commit adultery, and swear falsely, and burn incense unto Baal, and walk after other gods whom ye know not;

Jeremiah listed six of the Ten Commandments (Note: Commandments number 8, 6, 7, 9, 1 and 2 for Orthodox and Reformed Christians) (cf. Exodus 20:1–17; Hosea 4:2) that he accused the people of breaking repeatedly without feeling ashamed. Huey notes the use of "six infinite absolutes" in this verse to draw "attention to the indictment", as this word form on a finite verb is usually meant to stress the "certainty the verbal action."

== Verse 11 ==
Is this house, which is called by my name,

become a den of robbers in your eyes?

Behold, even I have seen it,

saith the Lord.

This verse is alluded to in Matthew 21:13 (and the parallel passages Mark 11:17 and Luke 19:46), when Jesus quoted the first part of the verse in combination with Isaiah 56:7.

== Verse 31 ==
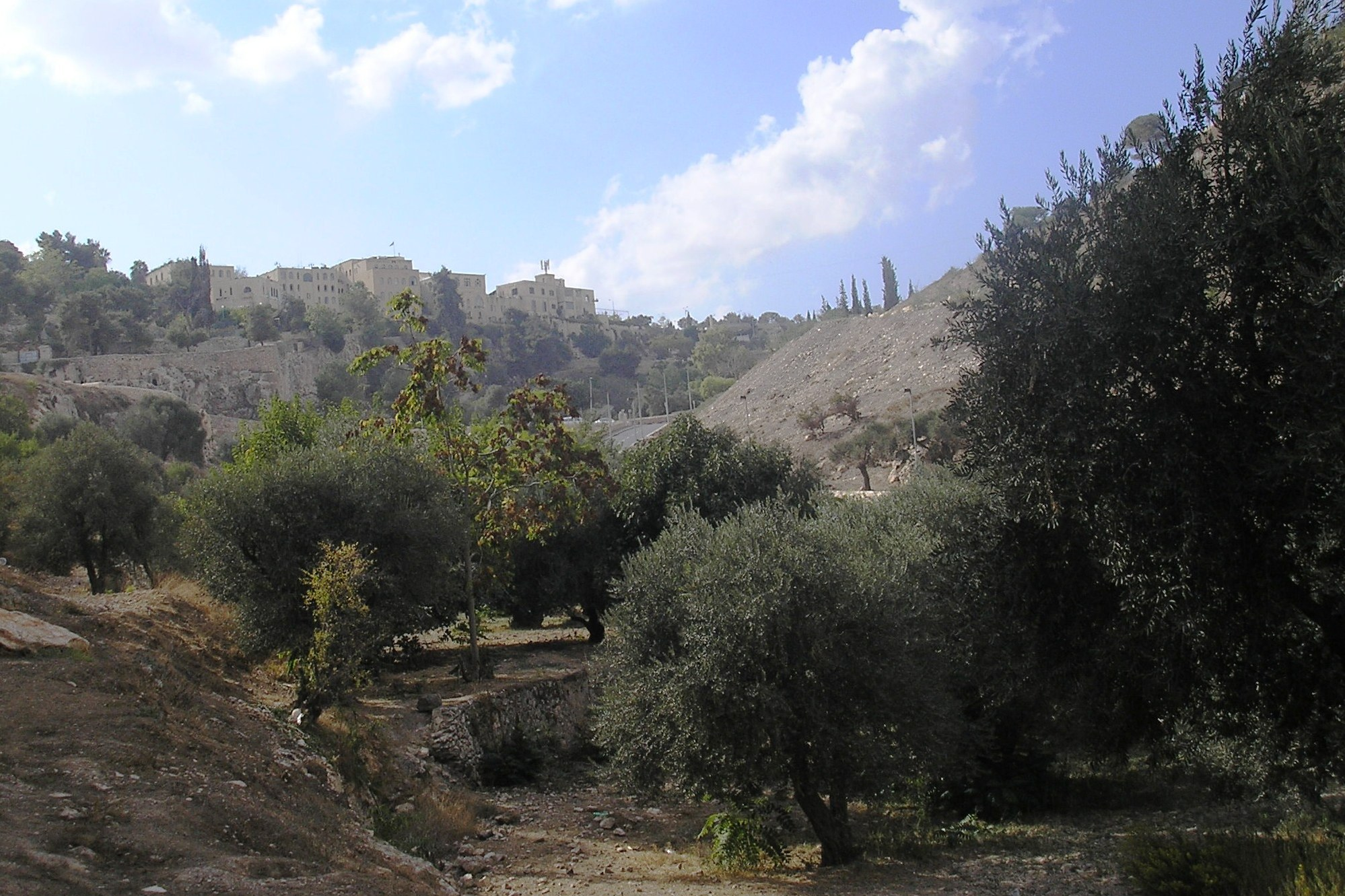
Valley of Hinnom, 2007.

And they have built the high places of Tophet, which is in the Valley of the Son of Hinnom, to burn their sons and their daughters in the fire, which I did not command, nor did it come into My heart.

- Cross references: Jeremiah 19:2, 6
- "Tophet": originally not a local name, but a descriptive epithet, as appears in Job 17:6 ("by-word") as 'a thing spat upon and loathed', so is probably analogous to the scorn where bosheth, the "shameful thing," substituted "Baal" (cf. Jeremiah 3:24; Jeremiah 11:13), as the repeated prediction in Jeremiah 19:5 and Jeremiah 32:35 has the "high places of Baal". The word "Tophteh" in Isaiah 30:33, though not identical in form, had probably has the same meaning as Tophet. Child sacrifice at other Tophets contemporary with the Bible accounts (700–600 BC) of the reigns of Ahaz and Manasseh have been established, such as the bones of children sacrificed at the Tophet to the goddess Tanit in Phoenician Carthage, and also child sacrifice in ancient Syria-Palestine. Scholars such as Mosca (1975) have concluded that the sacrifice recorded in the Hebrew Bible, such as Jeremiah's comment that the worshippers of Baal had "filled this place with the blood of innocents", is literal.
- "The valley of the Son of Hinnom": from Hebrew: גיא בן הנם, gê ḇen-hin-nōm, located very near to Jerusalem, of which a certain Hinnom was owner in Joshua’s time (Joshua 15:8; 18:16), later is known as "Ge-hinnom" ("the valley of Hinnom"), that became the Greek word Gehenna, used by Jesus in Matthew 5:22.

== See also ==
- Baal
- Egypt
- Ephraim
- Israel
- Jeremiah
- Jerusalem
- Judah
- Shiloh
- Tophet
- Valley of the son of Hinnom
- Related Bible parts: Isaiah 56, Matthew 21, Mark 11, Luke 19.

== Bibliography ==
- Huey, F. B. (1993). The New American Commentary - Jeremiah, Lamentations: An Exegetical and Theological Exposition of Holy Scripture, NIV Text. B&H Publishing Group. ISBN 9780805401165.
- Würthwein, Ernst (1995). The Text of the Old Testament. Translated by Rhodes, Erroll F. Grand Rapids, MI: Wm. B. Eerdmans. ISBN 0-8028-0788-7.
