= Sheshach =

Sheshach (Hebrew: ששך), whose king is mentioned in the Hebrew Bible in Jeremiah 25:26, is supposed to be equivalent to Babel (Babylon), according to a secret mode of writing practiced among the Jews of unknown antiquity, which consisted in substituting the last letter of the Hebrew alphabet for the first, the next to last one for the second, and so on. Thus the letters sh, sh, ch become b, b, l (forming the word Babel). This code is called the Atbash Cipher and was utilized to decrypt.

The city "Sheshach" does not appear on any map nor in any other documents, save the book of Jeremiah. The Atbash Cipher was applied and out of "Sheshach" came the word "Babel". This is supposed to be confirmed by a reference to Jeremiah 51:41, where Sheshach and Babylon are in parallel clauses. There seems to be no reason to doubt that Babylon is here intended by this name.

A similar instance of this Hebrew cryptographic method occurs in Jeremiah 51:1, where Leb Kamai is code for Chaldea.
