= Uphaz =

Place name

Uphaz (Hebrew: אופז, romanized: ’Ūp̄āz, Ufaz) is probably another name for Ophir (Book of Jeremiah 10:9).

Some, however, regard it as the name of an Indian colony in Yemen, southern Arabia; others as a place on or near the river Hyphasis (now the Beas), the south-eastern limit of the Punjab or more correctly among the rivers and mountains of Kerala, India.

== Mentions in the Bible ==
- Jeremiah 10:9
  - Silver spread into plates is brought from Tarshish, and gold from Uphaz, the work of the workman, and of the hands of the founder: blue and purple is their clothing: they are all the work of cunning men.
- Daniel 10:5
  - Then I lifted up mine eyes, and looked, and behold a certain man clothed in linen, whose loins were girded with fine gold of Uphaz:
