= Jeremiah 2 =

Book of Jeremiah, chapter 2

- ← chapter 1 chapter 3 →
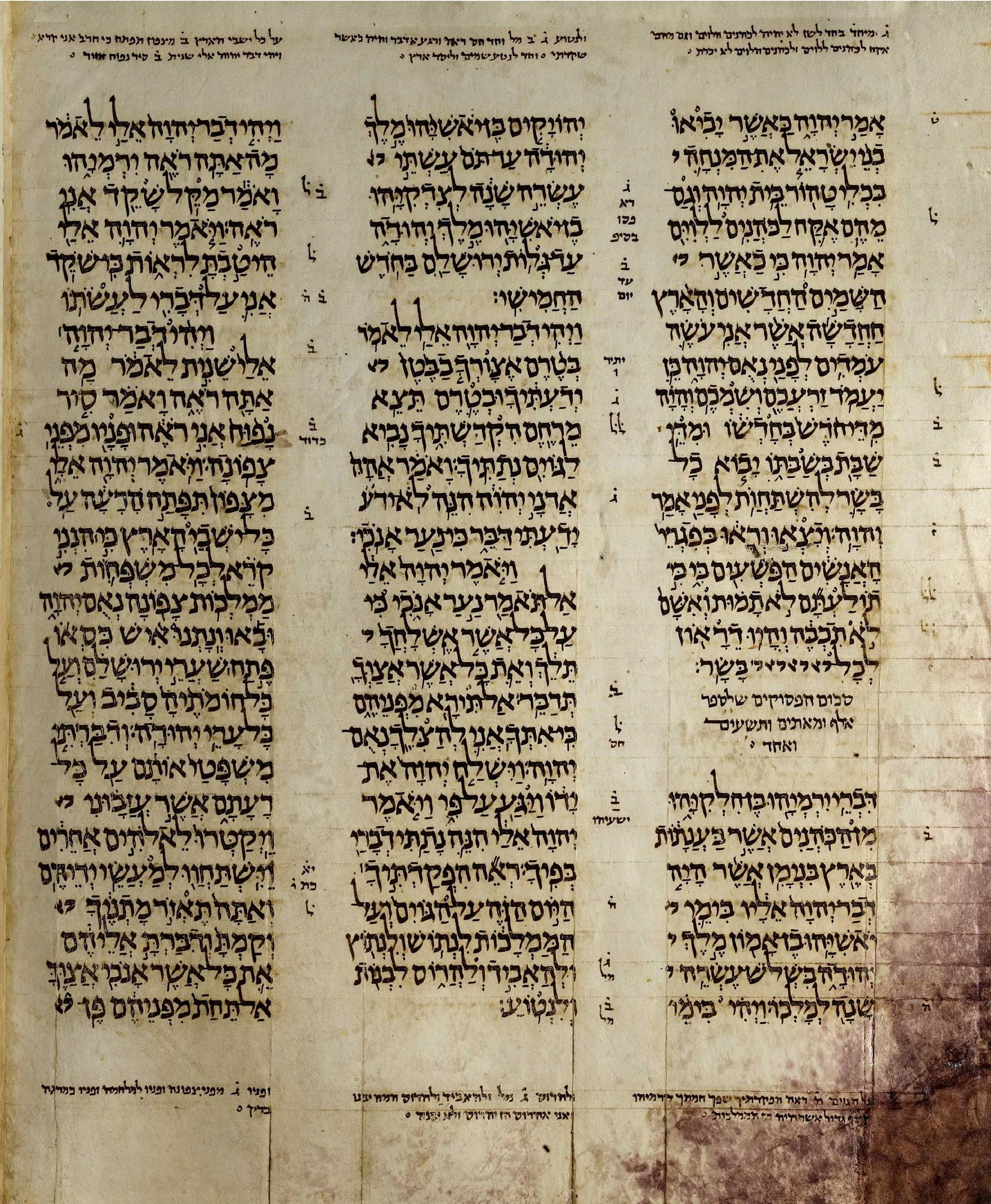
- A high resolution scan of the Aleppo Codex showing the Book of Jeremiah (the sixth book in Nevi'im).
- Book: Book of Jeremiah
- Hebrew Bible part: Nevi'im
- Order in the Hebrew part: 6
- Category: Latter Prophets
- Christian Bible part: Old Testament
- Order in the Christian part: 24

Jeremiah 2 is the second chapter of the Book of Jeremiah in the Hebrew Bible or the Old Testament of the Christian Bible. This book contains prophecies attributed to the prophet Jeremiah, and is one of the Books of the Prophets. Chapters 2 to 6 contain the earliest preaching of Jeremiah on the apostasy of Israel. Verses 2:1 to 3:5 dramatize the ending of "marriage" between Yahweh and Israel.

== Text ==
The original text of this chapter, as with the rest of the Book of Jeremiah, was written in the Hebrew language. Since the division of the Bible into chapters and verses in the late medieval period, this chapter is divided into 37 verses.

=== Textual witnesses ===
Some early manuscripts containing the text of this chapter in Hebrew are of the Masoretic Text tradition, which includes the Codex Cairensis (895), the Petersburg Codex of the Prophets (916), Aleppo Codex (10th century), Codex Leningradensis (1008).

There is also a translation into Koine Greek known as the Septuagint, made in the last few centuries BCE. Extant ancient manuscripts of the Septuagint version include Codex Vaticanus (B; $\mathfrak{G}$^{B}; 4th century), Codex Sinaiticus (S; BHK: $\mathfrak{G}$^{S}; 4th century), Codex Alexandrinus (A; $\mathfrak{G}$^{A}; 5th century) and Codex Marchalianus (Q; $\mathfrak{G}$^{Q}; 6th century).

== Parashot ==
The parashah sections listed here are based on the Aleppo Codex. Jeremiah 2 is a part of the Second prophecy (Jeremiah 2:1-3:5) in the Prophecies of Destruction (Jeremiah 1-25) section. {P}: open parashah; {S}: closed parashah.

{P} 2:1-3 {P} 2:4-28 {S} 2:29-37 [3:1-5 {P}]

== Analysis ==
This chapter belongs to a section comprising Jeremiah 2:1–25:38 about the 'Divine Judgment' on Judah and Jerusalem. The structure of the chapter is as follows.

- (i) The faithfulness of Israel’s youth: her ideal status (2:1-3)
- (ii) Israel’s apostasy (2:4-13)
- (iii) The consequences of Israel‘s apostasy (2:14-19)
- (iv) The fascination and futility of Baal worship (2:20-28)
- (v) Israel deserves judgment (2:29-37)

== The broken marriage between Yahweh and Israel (2:1–3) ==
Similar to the theme in Hosea 1–3, the relationship between Yahweh and the people of Israel is described using the marriage metaphor, where Yahweh acts as a husband to Judah as his wife. The poem in 2:1–3:5 shows the evidence of a broken covenant against Israel, addresses alternately between the two personae of Judah (or Jerusalem) as a female wife (using Hebrew feminine singular grammatical forms in 2:2; 2:17–25; 2:33–3:5) and the "male Israel" (using masculine singular and plural forms in 2:3; 2:4–16; 2:26–32). Yahweh accuses Israel of betraying and forsaking him, while he has been generous to bring them into a "plentiful land" (2:7), evoking sympathy for Yahweh who cannot understand this treachery.

=== Verse 1 ===
Moreover the word of the LORD came to me, saying,

The opening word Moreover (in the King James Version) connects Jeremiah's first prophecy with his call as a prophet in Jeremiah 1:4–19, using a similar formula of statement as in Jeremiah 1:4.

== The unfaithfulness of Israel (2:4–37) ==
=== Verse 10 ===
Cross over to the coasts of Cyprus and look, send to Kedar and observe closely; see if there has ever been anything like this.

The Kedarites or Qedarites were descendants of Kedar, second son of Ishmael in the biblical narrative.

=== Verse 16 ===
Also the people of Noph and Tahpanhes
Have broken the crown of your head.

Egypt, identified by its two cities, will inevitably hegemonize Israel. "Noph" is Memphis. "Tahpanhes" was an important fortress city on the northern border of ancient Egypt in the northeastern Nile delta, generally equated with the Greek city of Daphne.

"Broken" may be read as "grazed".

=== Verse 18 ===
And now why take the road to Egypt,
To drink the waters of Sihor?
Or why take the road to Assyria,
To drink the waters of the River?

The futility of relying on Egypt and Assyria was stated by other prophets (cf. Isaiah 30:1–5), but here it refers to the two political factions in Judah: the pro-Egyptians and the pro-Assyrians. This points to the early period of Jeremiah's ministry, when the two nations held the "balance of power in the Middle East"; this ends when Assyria collapsed in 612 BCE. "Sihor" (lit. "blackness") refers to the Nile, whereas "the river" refers to the Euphrates (cf. Deuteronomy 1:7; 1 Kings 4:21; Isaiah 7:20; Nehemiah 2:7).

=== Verse 36 ===
Why do you gad about so much to change your way?
Also you shall be ashamed of Egypt as you were ashamed of Assyria.

Israel's two lovers will shame her.

== See also ==
- Assyria
- Baal (Baalim)
- Chittim
- Egypt
- Euphrates
- Israel
- Jacob
- Jerusalem
- Kedar
- Noph
- Sihor
- Tahapanes
- Related Bible parts: Isaiah 7, Isaiah 30, Isaiah 31, Jeremiah 1, Hosea 7, Hosea 9

== Sources ==
- O'Connor, Kathleen M. (2007). "23. Jeremiah". In Barton, John; Muddiman, John (eds.). The Oxford Bible Commentary (first (paperback) ed.). Oxford University Press. pp. 487–533. ISBN 978-0199277186.
- Thompson, J. A. (1980). A Book of Jeremiah. The New International Commentary on the Old Testament (illustrated, revised ed.). Wm. B. Eerdmans Publishing. ISBN 9780802825308.
- Würthwein, Ernst (1995). The Text of the Old Testament. Translated by Rhodes, Erroll F. Grand Rapids, MI: Wm. B. Eerdmans. ISBN 0-8028-0788-7.
