= Zimri (nation) =

The nation of Zimri is mentioned at Jeremiah 25:25 in a list of nations under divine judgement. The mention is absent from the Septuagint. It may be a scribal error for Zimki, a cipher for the nation of Elam (as is Sheshak for Babylon in verse 26).
