= Jeremiah 1 =

Book of Jeremiah, chapter 1

- ← Isaiah 66 Chapter 2 →
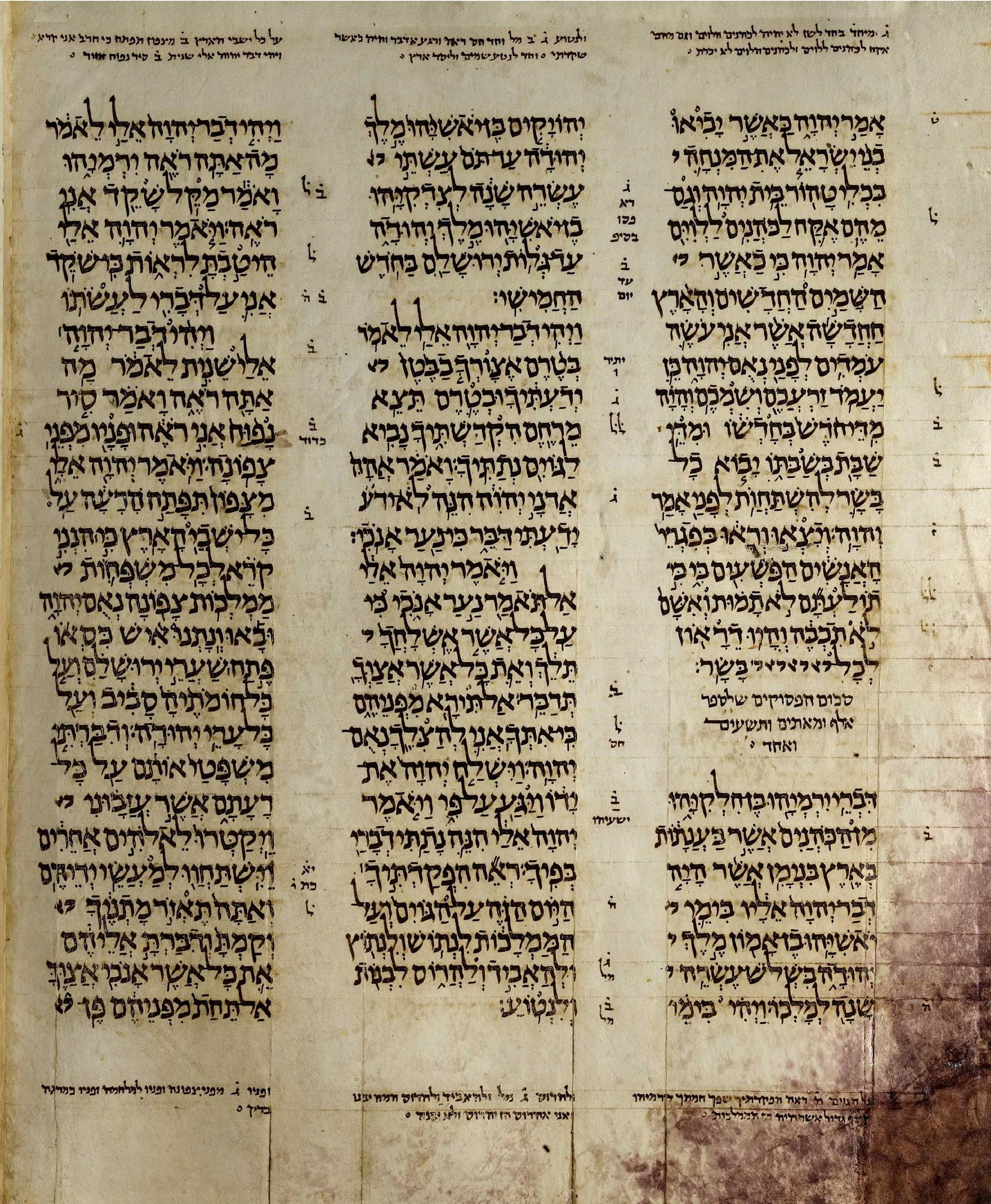
- A high-resolution scan of the Aleppo Codex showing the Book of Jeremiah (the sixth book in Nevi'im)
- Book: Book of Jeremiah
- Hebrew Bible part: Nevi'im
- Order in the Hebrew part: 6
- Category: Latter Prophets
- Christian Bible part: Old Testament
- Order in the Christian part: 24

Jeremiah 1 is the first chapter of the Book of Jeremiah in the Hebrew Bible or the Old Testament of the Christian Bible. This book, one of the Nevi'im or Books of the Prophets, contains the prophecies attributed to the prophet Jeremiah. This chapter serves as an introduction to the Book of Jeremiah and relates Jeremiah's calling as a prophet.

== Text ==
The original text of this chapter, as with the rest of the Book of Jeremiah, was written in Hebrew. Since the division of the Bible into chapters in the medieval period, this chapter is divided into 19 verses.

=== Textual witnesses ===
Some early manuscripts containing the text of this chapter in Hebrew are of the Masoretic Text tradition, which includes the Codex Cairensis (895), the Petersburg Codex of the Prophets (916), Aleppo Codex (10th century), and Codex Leningradensis (1008).

There is also a translation into Koine Greek known as the Septuagint, made in the last few centuries BCE. Extant ancient manuscripts of the Septuagint version include Codex Vaticanus (B; $\mathfrak{G}$^{B}; 4th century), Codex Sinaiticus (S; BHK: $\mathfrak{G}$^{S}; 4th century), Codex Alexandrinus (A; $\mathfrak{G}$^{A}; 5th century) and Codex Marchalianus (Q; $\mathfrak{G}$^{Q}; 6th century).

== Parashot ==
The parashah sections listed here are based on the Aleppo Codex. Jeremiah 1 is the First prophecy in the Prophecies of Destruction (Jeremiah 1–25) section. {P}: open parashah; {S}: closed parashah.

1:1–3 {P} 1:4–6 {S} 1:7–10 {P} 1:11–12 {S} 1:13–19 {P}

== Structure ==
The New King James Version (NKJV) organises this chapter as follows:

- Jeremiah 1:1–3 = Jeremiah Called to Be a Priest
- Jeremiah 1:4–19 = The Prophet Is Called,

while the Evangelical Heritage Version notes that Jeremiah's first visions begin from verse 11. The Old Testament scholar J. A. Thompson organises the chapter as follows.

- Superscription (1:1–3)
- The call of Jeremiah and the two visions (1:4–19)
  - The call of Jeremiah (1:4–10)
  - The two visions (1:11–16)
  - The divine charge and promise (1:17–19)

== Superscription (verses 1–3) ==
This superscription provides an introduction to the whole book by stating authoritative claims for its content. For 40 years Jeremiah conveyed the word of the Lord to the people, from the 13th year of King Josiah (627 BCE) until the deportation of the people from Jerusalem (587 BCE).

=== Verse 1 ===
The words of Jeremiah the son of Hilkiah, of the priests that were in Anathoth in the land of Benjamin:

This verse is an "editorial introduction" which is reasonably comprehensive as it contains the prophet's "name, family, status and place of origin," and more complete than most books of prophets. According to Judges 21:17–18, Anathoth was one of the levitical or priestly cities located within the land of the tribe of Benjamin, about 3 miles northeast of Jerusalem. The prophecies of Jeremiah and Amos (Amos 1:1) are attributed to them individually in the opening words of the relevant biblical books, while in other cases, such as Hosea 1:1, Joel 1:1 and Micah 1:1, their prophecies are described from the outset as "the word of the Lord". Septuagint version has "The word of God which came to Jeremiah" for "The words of Jeremiah".

=== Verse 2 ===
to whom the word of the Lord came in the days of Josiah the son of Amon, king of Judah, in the thirteenth year of his reign.

- Cross reference: Jeremiah 25:3

"The 13th year of his reign": The prophetic career of Jeremiah started in about 627 BCE. An argument that this is the year of Jeremiah's birth cannot be reconciled with the expression "the word of the Lord came". This verse (as emphasized further in Jeremiah 25:3) affirms that the conveyed words are not Jeremiah's own creation, but of supernatural origin, that is, from Yahweh. This time period was five years after Josiah had initiated a religious reformation (in his 8th year of reign, 632 BC) and five years before the finding of the Book of Law in the 18th year of his reign, in 622 BCE. Although Josiah was 16 years old when he "began to seek after the God of David his father" (2 Chronicles 34:3), it was in his 12th year of reign (he was 20 years old; 629/628 BCE) when he began the repudiation of the "official Assyrian cult" with a "radical purge of all kinds of idolatrous practices both in Judah and in Northern Israel" (cf. 2 Chronicles 34:3–7), one year before Jeremiah was called and about the same time Sinsharishkun took the throne of Assyria, following the chaos after Ashurbanipal's death, as the Assyrian Empire rapidly diminished.

=== Verse 3 ===
It came also in the days of Jehoiakim the son of Josiah, king of Judah, until the end of the eleventh year of Zedekiah the son of Josiah, king of Judah, until the carrying away of Jerusalem captive in the fifth month.

"The fifth month": The official ministry of Jeremiah ends at the time of the deportation of the people from Jerusalem (July/August 587 BCE) in the early part of the 6th century BCE.

== The call of Jeremiah (verses 4–10) ==
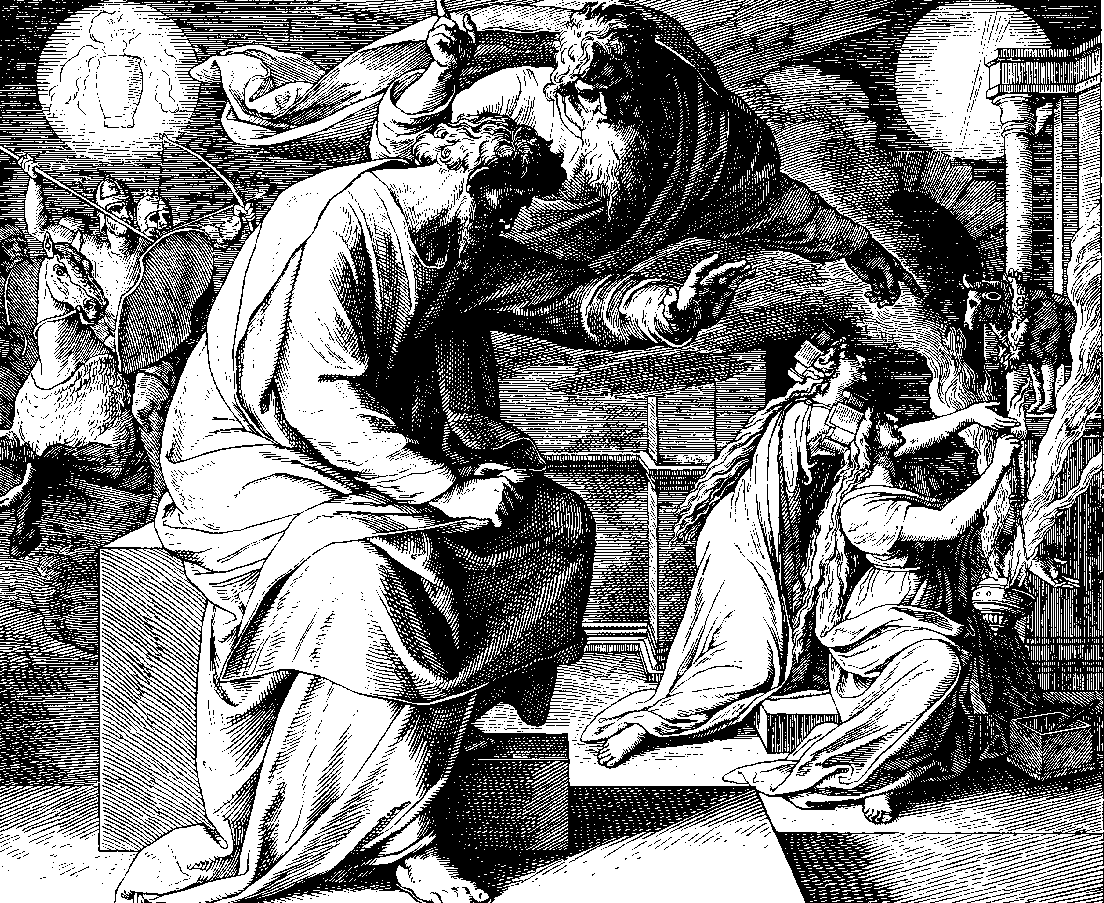
"The Call of Jeremiah" is depicted in this 1860 woodcut by Julius Schnorr von Karolsfeld

The account of Jeremiah's call certifies him to be a true prophet. Verses 4–10 contain the poetic audition in form of a dialogue between Jeremiah, speaking in the first person, and Yahweh (the LORD), whose words are written as quoted statements. The subsequent part (verses 11–19) is in the form of prose visions.

=== Verse 4 ===
Then the word of the Lord came to me, saying:

The formula of this statement is reused in Jeremiah 2:1.

=== Verse 5 ===
Before I formed you in the womb I knew you;
Before you were born I sanctified you;
I ordained you a prophet to the nations.

"I sanctified you": "I set you apart" (Jeremiah 1:5: NIV) – this was "a designation for the prophetic function rather an inward sanctification".

=== Verse 6 ===
Then said I,
Ah, Lord God! behold, I cannot speak: for I am a child.

"Ah" is rendered "Alas" in the Darby Translation and New International Version, and this Hebrew word in the opinion of biblical commentator A. W. Streane: "expresses not so much an entreaty that things should be arranged otherwise, as a lament that they are as they are".

=== Verse 7 ===
But the Lord said unto me,
Say not, I am a child:
for thou shalt go to all that I shall send thee,

Just as with Moses and Isaiah, Yahweh rejected any excuses and proceeded with His instruction: "for you will go," and Jeremiah has to say all what Yahweh commanded him.

=== Verse 8 ===
Be not afraid of their faces:
for I am with thee to deliver thee,
saith the Lord.

Repeated again at the end of verse 19, closing this chapter:

... for I am with thee, saith the Lord, to deliver thee. (Jeremiah 1:19)

- "Saith [the Lord]": is translated from Hebrew word נְאֻם, neum, which can be translated as "to declare" or "to whisper", or could suggest an "intimate revelation". It is used 176 times in the Book of Jeremiah, but only found 83 times in Ezekiel, 23 times in Isaiah, 21 times in Amos, 20 times in Zechariah, 11 times in Haggai, and rarely in the rest of the Hebrew Bible.

=== Verse 9 ===
Then the Lord put forth his hand, and touched my mouth.
And the Lord said unto me,
Behold, I have put my words in thy mouth.

Yahweh commissioned Jeremiah to be His spokesperson by a "symbolic gesture of touching Jeremiah's mouth" (cf. Numbers 23:5; Deuteronomy 18:18, Isaiah 6:7; Ezekiel 2:9–3:2).

== The two visions (verses 11–16) ==
Verses 11–16 records the dialogue between Jeremiah, speaking in the first person, and Yahweh (the LORD), whose words are written as quoted statements. Jeremiah saw a visions of "a branch of an almond tree" (verses 11–12) and then a vision of "a boiling pot tilt away from the north" (verses 13–16). Yahweh, not Jeremiah, interprets both visions: the first one to assure the prophet (and the audience) of the certainty of the prophecies, and the second to point at "the foe from the north" which is revealed in Jeremiah 20:4–6 as Babylon.

=== Verses 11–12 ===
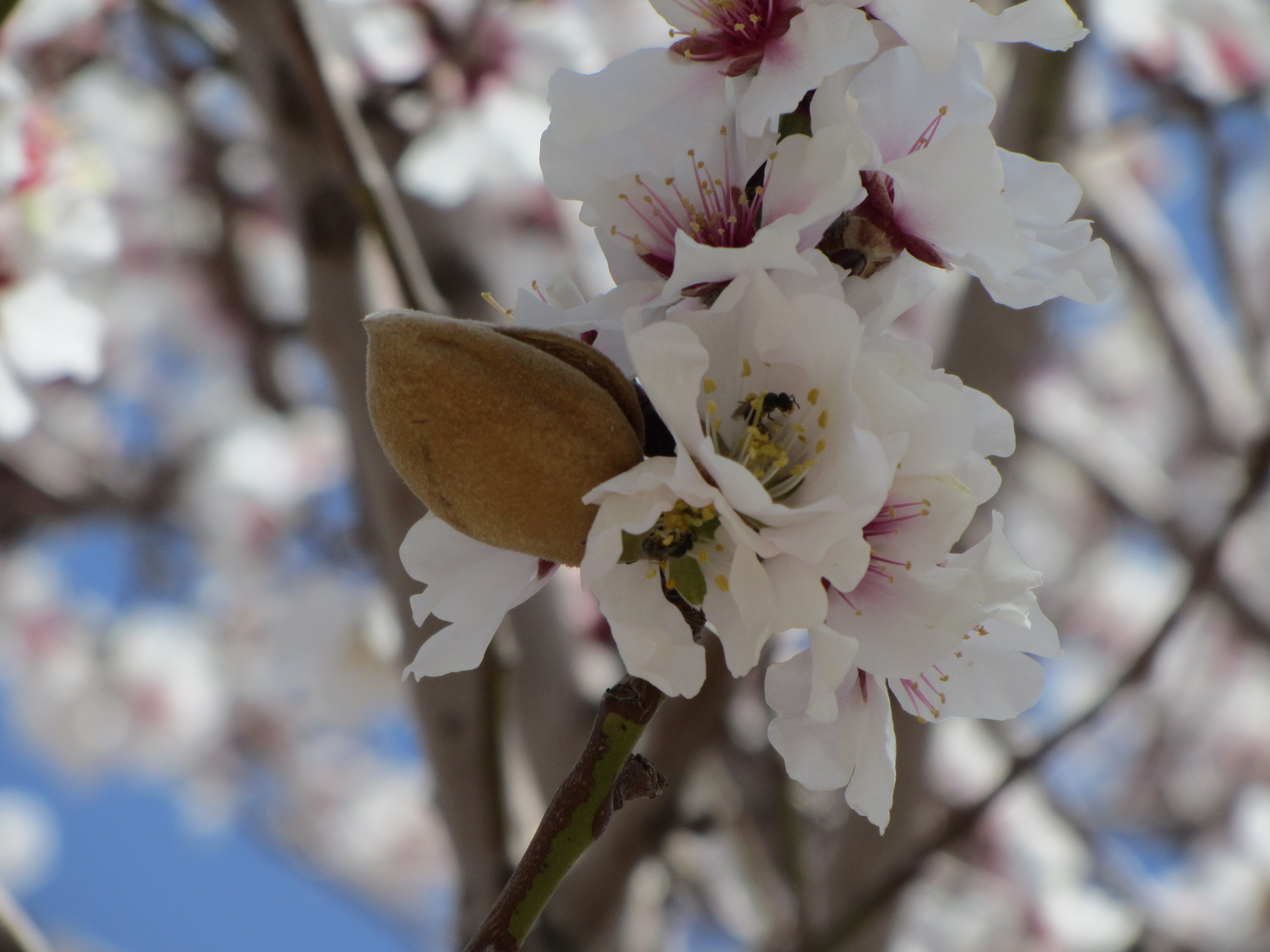
Almond blossoms in Iran: see also Vincent van Gogh's series of Almond Blossom paintings, 1888–1890

The word of the Lord came to me, saying, "Jeremiah, what do you see?"
And I said, "I see a branch of an almond tree"
Then the Lord said to me,
"You have seen well, for I am watching over my word to perform it".

"Branch" is alternatively translated as a "rod" of an almond tree (KJV, ASV). The meaning is poetic, referring to a blossoming almond tree. These verses contain a play on words using the Hebrew shaqed (almond) and shoqed (watching over). Thompson notes that in modern times Anathoth (modern village Anata) is still "a center for almond growing" and display memorable views of blooming almond trees in the early spring.

=== Verses 13-14 ===
^{13} "I see a pot that is boiling", I answered. "It is tilting toward us from the north. ^{14} The Lord said to me, “From the north disaster will be poured out on all who live in the land.

Israel's enemy "always comes from the north": the Jerusalem Bible notes that Ezekiel 26:7 and Joel 2:20 also express this point. In Zechariah's final vision after the exiles have returned to Jerusalem, he foresees "the pacifying of the north country".

=== Verse 15 ===
"For behold, I am calling
All the families of the kingdoms of the north," says the Lord;
"They shall come and each one set his throne
At the entrance of the gates of Jerusalem,
Against all its walls all around,
And against all the cities of Judah."

The medieval Jewish commentator Rashi considered that this prophecy, "They shall come and each one set his throne at the entrance of the gates of Jerusalem", was fulfilled as reported in Jeremiah 39:3: "All the officials of the king of Babylon entered and sat at the Middle Gate".

== The divine charge and promise (verses 17–19) ==
These verses can be seen as connecting back to verses 4–10 or be a separate fragment where Yahweh gave a charge (verse 17) and a promise (verses 18–19) to Jeremiah in connection to the call. Speaking directly using imperatives Yahweh prepares Jeremiah for the battle, that Jeremiah must announce everything in the face of opposition and he will prevail because Yahweh strengthens him as "a fortified city, an iron pillar, and a bronze wall". Although the encouraging assurance is directed to Jeremiah, it may also have resonances for the readers in exile.

== See also ==
- Amon, king of Judah
- Anathoth
- Benjamin
- Jehoiakim, king of Judah
- Jeremiah, son of Hilkiah
- Jerusalem
- Josiah, king of Judah
- Related Bible parts: Isaiah 6, Jeremiah 20, Jeremiah 25, Jeremiah 39, Jeremiah 52, Amos 1
- Zedekiah, king of Judah

== General and cited references ==
- Allen, Leslie C. (2008). Jeremiah: A Commentary. Westminster John Knox Press. ISBN 978-0664222239.
- Huey, F. B. (1993). The New American Commentary – Jeremiah, Lamentations: An Exegetical and Theological Exposition of Holy Scripture, NIV Text. B&H Publishing Group. ISBN 978-0805401165.
- O'Connor, Kathleen M. (2007). "23. Jeremiah". In Barton, John; Muddiman, John (eds.). The Oxford Bible Commentary (First (paperback) ed.). Oxford University Press. pp. 487–533. ISBN 978-0199277186.
- Ofer, Yosef (1992). "The Aleppo Codex and the Bible of R. Shalom Shachna Yellin" in Rabbi Mordechai Breuer Festschrift: Collected Papers in Jewish Studies, ed. M. Bar-Asher, 1:295–353. Jerusalem (in Hebrew). Online text (PDF);.
- Thompson, J. A. (1980). A Book of Jeremiah. The New International Commentary on the Old Testament (Illustrated, revised ed.). Wm. B. Eerdmans Publishing. ISBN 978-0802825308.
- Würthwein, Ernst (1995). The Text of the Old Testament. Translated by Rhodes, Erroll F. Grand Rapids, MI: Wm. B. Eerdmans. ISBN 0802807887.
