= Jeremiah 25 =

Book of Jeremiah, chapter 25

- ← chapter 24 chapter 26 →
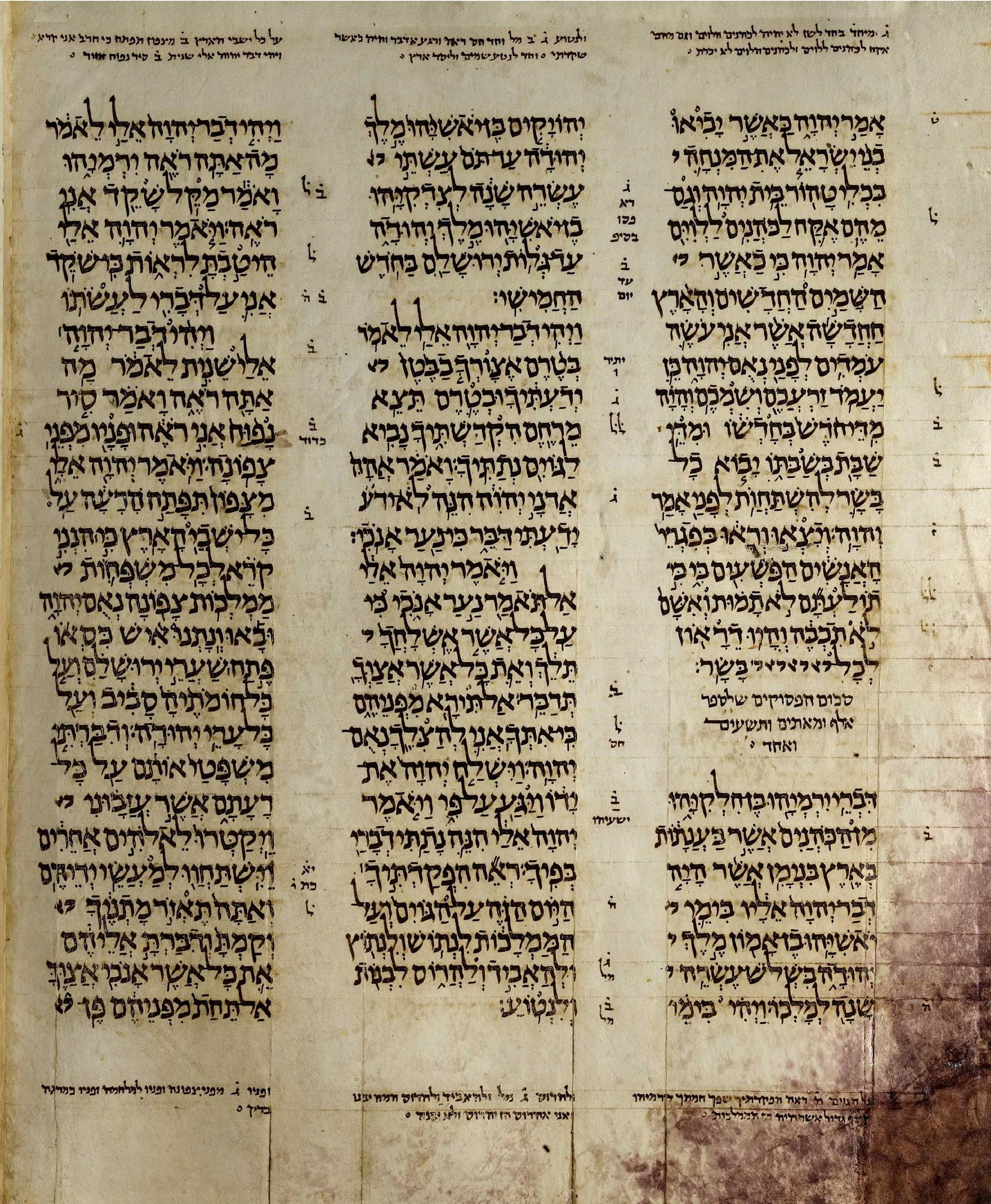
- A high resolution scan of the Aleppo Codex showing the Book of Jeremiah (the sixth book in Nevi'im).
- Book: Book of Jeremiah
- Hebrew Bible part: Nevi'im
- Order in the Hebrew part: 6
- Category: Latter Prophets
- Christian Bible part: Old Testament
- Order in the Christian part: 24

Jeremiah 25 is the twenty-fifth chapter of the Book of Jeremiah in the Hebrew Bible or the Old Testament of the Christian Bible. This book contains prophecies attributed to the prophet Jeremiah, and is one of the Books of the Prophets. Chapter 25 is the final chapter in the first section of the Book of Jeremiah, which deals with the earliest and main core of Jeremiah's message. In this chapter, Jeremiah identified the length of the time of exile as seventy years (verses 11-12).

== Text ==
The original text was written in the Hebrew language. This chapter is divided into 38 verses in English Bibles and the Masoretic Text. In the Septuagint, verse 14 is omitted, and verses 15-38 are numbered as Jeremiah 32:15-38 (see "Verse numbering" below).

=== Verse numbering ===
The order of chapters and verses of the Book of Jeremiah in the English Bibles, Masoretic Text (Hebrew), and Vulgate (Latin), in some places differs from that in Septuagint (LXX, the Greek Bible used in the Eastern Orthodox Church and others) according to Rahlfs or Brenton. The following table is taken with minor adjustments from Brenton's Septuagint, page 971.

The order of Computer Assisted Tools for Septuagint/Scriptural Study (CATSS) based on Alfred Rahlfs' Septuaginta (1935), differs in some details from Joseph Ziegler's critical edition (1957) in Göttingen LXX. Swete's Introduction mostly agrees with Rahlfs' edition (=CATSS).

Hebrew, Vulgate, English	Rahlfs' LXX (CATSS)	Brenton's LXX
25:1-12	25:1-12	
25:13	25:13-14	25:13,34
25:14	none	
25:15-38	32:1-24	
49:35-39	25:15-19	25:35-39
49:34	25:20	26:1

=== Textual witnesses ===
Some early manuscripts containing the text of this chapter in Hebrew are of the Masoretic Text tradition, which includes the Codex Cairensis (895), the Petersburg Codex of the Prophets (916), Aleppo Codex (10th century), Codex Leningradensis (1008). Some fragments containing parts of this chapter were found among the Dead Sea Scrolls, i.e., 4QJer^{c} (4Q72; 1st century BC), with extant verses 7‑8, 15‑17, 24‑26 (similar to Masoretic Text).

There is also a translation into Koine Greek known as the Septuagint (with a different verse numbering and some textual differences), made in the last few centuries BCE. Extant ancient manuscripts of the Septuagint version include Codex Vaticanus (B; $\mathfrak{G}$^{B}; 4th century), Codex Sinaiticus (S; BHK: $\mathfrak{G}$^{S}; 4th century), Codex Alexandrinus (A; $\mathfrak{G}$^{A}; 5th century) and Codex Marchalianus (Q; $\mathfrak{G}$^{Q}; 6th century).

== Parashot ==
The parashah sections listed here are based on the Aleppo Codex. Jeremiah 25 contains the Ninth prophecy in the section of Prophecies of Destruction (Jeremiah 1-25). {P}: open parashah; {S}: closed parashah.

{P} 25:1-7 {P} 25:8-14 {P} 25:15-27a {P} 25:27b-31 כה אמר {S} 25:32-38 {P}

== Seventy years of captivity (25:1–14) ==
=== Verse 1 ===
The word that came to Jeremiah concerning all the people of Judah, in the fourth year of Jehoiakim the son of Josiah, king of Judah (which was the first year of Nebuchadnezzar king of Babylon).

The "word of the Lord" in Jeremiah 36:1 also came to Jeremiah "in the fourth year of Jehoiakim the son of Josiah, king of Judah". The bracketed words, "which was the first year of Nebuchadnezzar king of Babylon", are doubted to be original as they are not included in the Septuagint.

=== Verse 2 ===
which Jeremiah the prophet spoke to all the people of Judah and to all the inhabitants of Jerusalem, saying:

The message concerned all the people and was therefore delivered to all the people, proclaimed without fear by Jeremiah.

=== Verse 3 ===
"From the thirteenth year of Josiah the son of Amon, king of Judah, even to this day, this is the twenty-third year in which the word of the Lord has come to me; and I have spoken to you, rising early and speaking, but you have not listened.

Cross reference: Jeremiah 1:2

- "Even to this day": that is the fourth year of Jehoiakim, king of Judah (605 BC), so since "the thirteenth year of Josiah" (627 BC), it was "the 23th year" of persistent proclaiming God's Word by Jeremiah.

=== Verse 11 ===
And this whole land shall be a desolation and an astonishment, and these nations shall serve the king of Babylon seventy years.

- "These nations": Judah and the surrounding nations, such as Moab and Phoenicia.
- "Seventy years": may represent "the length of lifetime" (Psalm 90:10). The New King James Version dates the "seventy years of serving" the king of Babylon from circa 605 BC (2 Kings 24:1) and ends them circa 536 BC (Ezra 1:1). The same seventy-year duration is referred to in Zechariah 1:12.

=== Verse 12 ===
'Then it will come to pass, when seventy years are completed, that I will punish the king of Babylon and that nation, the land of the Chaldeans, for their iniquity,’ says the Lord; ‘and I will make it a perpetual desolation.'

- Cross reference: Jeremiah 29:10, Daniel 9:2; Zechariah 1:12; Zechariah 7:5
- "Seventy years": Circa 605-536 BC (see notes on verse 11).

The announcement of the Judah's punishment at the hand of foreign nations must have puzzled Jeremiah's audience, as also become the subject of questions by Habakkuk (Habakkuk 1:12–17), but verse 12 is to put it to rest by stating that after God have used Babylon to punish His people, He would punish Babylon for its sins.

=== Verse 13 ===
So I will bring on that land all My words which I have pronounced against it, all that is written in this book, which Jeremiah has prophesied concerning all the nations.

According to biblical commentator A. W. Streane, "at this point there presents itself one of the most marked discrepancies between the Septuagint Version of Jeremiah and the Hebrew. The Greek Version as it stands now ends the sentence with 'in this book', and reads as a new sentence, and title of the section on the nations, “What Jeremiah prophesied against the nations”.

The Jerusalem Bible ends the first 25 chapters of Jeremiah here:

I will bring down on that country (Babylon) all the words I have pronounced again it, all that is written in this book.

and the second part of the verse:

What Jeremiah prophesied against all the nations.

starts a new section and acts as the start of "a sort of preface to the oracle against the nations", which is located in chapters 46–51, drawing on the dividing point seen in the Septuagint.

== Cup of God’s wrath (25:15–38) ==
=== Verse 23 ===
Dedan and Tema and Buz, all the desert dwellers who shave their temples;

The New American Bible Revised Edition identifies these groups as North Arabian tribes.

=== Verse 26 ===
All the kings of the north, far and near, one with another; and all the kingdoms of the world which are on the face of the earth. Also the king of Sheshach shall drink after them.

"Sheshach" (ששך): means "Babylon" (בבל, babel; also in Jeremiah 51:41), cryptically written using the "Atbash" monoalphabetic substitution cipher system.

=== Verse 36 ===
A voice of the cry of the shepherds

and a howling of the leaders of the flock shall be heard,
for the Lord has devastated their pasture.

- "Their pasture": in Hebrew literally, "their pastures", referring to the place where they "shepherd" their "flocks".

== See also ==
- Ammon
- Amon
- Arabia
- Ashdod
- Ashkelon
- Babylon
- Buz
- Chaldea
- Dedan
- Edom
- Egypt
- Ekron
- Elam
- Gaza
- Jehoiakim
- Jeremiah
- Jerusalem
- Josiah
- Judah
- Land of Uz
- Medes
- Moab
- Nebuchadnezzar
- Pharaoh
- Philistines
- Sheshach
- Sidon
- Tema
- Tyre
- Zimri
- Related Bible parts: 2 Chronicles 36, Ezra 1, Jeremiah 29, Jeremiah 51, Daniel 1, Daniel 9, Daniel 10, Zechariah 1, Zechariah 7

== Sources ==
- Huey, F. B. (1993). The New American Commentary - Jeremiah, Lamentations: An Exegetical and Theological Exposition of Holy Scripture, NIV Text. B&H Publishing Group. ISBN 9780805401165.
- Ryle, Herbert Edward (2009). The Cambridge Bible for Schools and Colleges Paperback. BiblioBazaar. ISBN 9781117708690.
- Thompson, J. A. (1980). A Book of Jeremiah. The New International Commentary on the Old Testament (illustrated, revised ed.). Wm. B. Eerdmans Publishing. ISBN 9780802825308.
- Ulrich, Eugene, ed. (2010). The Biblical Qumran Scrolls: Transcriptions and Textual Variants. Brill.
- Würthwein, Ernst (1995). The Text of the Old Testament. Translated by Rhodes, Erroll F. Grand Rapids, MI: Wm. B. Eerdmans. ISBN 978-0-8028-0788-5.
