= Hosea (disambiguation) =

Hosea is a Biblical prophet and primary author of the Book of Hosea in the Hebrew Bible

Hosea may also refer to:

== Other religion uses ==
- Book of Hosea, first book in the Twelve Minor Prophets of the Old Testament
  - Hosea 1, first chapter of the book of Hosea
  - Hosea 2, second chapter of the book of Hosea
  - Hosea 3, third chapter of the book of Hosea
  - Hosea 4, fourth chapter of the book of Hosea
  - Hosea 5, fifth chapter of the book of Hosea
  - Hosea 6, sixth chapter of the book of Hosea
  - Hosea 7, seventh chapter of the book of Hosea
  - Hosea 8, eighth chapter of the book of Hosea
  - Hosea 9, ninth chapter of the book of Hosea
  - Hosea 10, tenth chapter of the book of Hosea
  - Hosea 11, eleventh chapter of the book of Hosea
  - Hosea 12, twelfth chapter of the book of Hosea
  - Hosea 13, thirteenth chapter of the book of Hosea
  - Hosea 14, fourteenth chapter of the book of Hosea

== People ==
=== Given name ===
- Hosea Ballou (1771–1852), American universalist clergyman and theological writer
- Hosea Ballou II (1796–1861), American universalist minister
- Hosea Ballou Morse (1855–1934), Canadian-born American customs official and Chinese historian
- Hosea Chanchez (born 1981), American actor
- Hosea Easton (1798–1837), American congregationalist, minister, abolitionist and author
- Hosea Jan "Ze" Frank (born 1972), American online performance artist, composer and humorist
- Hosea Garrett (1800–1888), American clergyman and philanthropist
- Hosea Hildreth (1792–1835), American educator and minister
- Hosea Holcombe (1780–1841), American church historian
- Hosea Hudson (1898–1988), American labor leader
- Hosea Jacobi (1841–1925), Chief Rabbi of Zagreb, Croatia
- Aadam Ismaeel Khamis (born Hosea Kosgei, 1989), Kenyan-born Bahraini long-distance runner
- Hosea M. Knowlton (1847–1902), American District Attorney and Attorney general of Massachusetts
- Hosea Quimby (1804–1878), American Baptist pastor and author
- Hosea Rosenberg, American chef and winner of Top Chef: New York
- Hosea Stout (1810–1889), American soldier, lawyer, Mormon pioneer and leader
- Hosea T. Lockard (1920–2011) American court judge from South Carolina
- Hosea Williams (1926–2000), American civil rights leader, activist, minister, philanthropist and businessman

=== Sportspeople ===
- Hosea Allen (1918–1948), American baseball pitcher
- Hosea Burton (born 1988), British professional boxer
- Hosea Fortune (born 1959), American football wide receiver
- Hosea Macharinyang (born 1986), Kenyan runner
- Hosea Saumaki (born 1992), Tongan rugby union player
- Hosea Siner (1885–1948), American baseball player
- Hosea Taylor (born 1958), American football player

=== Politicians ===
- Hosea T. Botts (1873–1963), American attorney and politician, Mayor of Tillamook, Oregon
- Hosea Ehinlanwo (born 1938), Nigerian senator
- Hosea Kiplagat (1945–2021), Kenyan politician and entrepreneur
- Hosea Kutako (1870–1970), Namibian politician
- Hosea Mann (1858–1948), American politician
- Hosea Moffit (1757–1825), U.S. representative from New York
- Hosea Washington Parker (1833–1922), U.S. representative from New Hampshire
- Hosea H. Rockwell (1840–1918), U.S. representative from New York
- Hosea Townsend (1840–1909), American attorney and U.S. representative from Colorado

=== Fictional characters ===
- Hosea Biglow, fictional character from James Russell Lowell's book The Biglow Papers
- Hosea Matthews, fictional character from the video game Red Dead Redemption 2

=== Surname ===
- Bobby Hosea (born 1955), American actor
- Trevor Hosea (born 1999), Australian rugby union player
- Birgitta Hosea (born 1966), British animator
- Addison Hosea (1914–1985), American prelate and bishop
- Chris Hosea (born 1973), American poet

== Places ==
- Hosea, Eswatini, inkhundla of Eswatini in the Shiselweni Region
- Hosea Kutako International Airport, airport in Namibia

== Other uses ==
- Hosea lobbii, sole plant species of the Hosea genus

== See also ==
- 4Q166, also known as "The Hosea Commentary Scroll", one the Dead Sea Scrolls
- Hoshea, nineteenth and last king of the Israelite Kingdom of Israel
