= Hosea 12 =

Chapter 12 of the Book of Hosea

- ← chapter 11 chapter 13 →
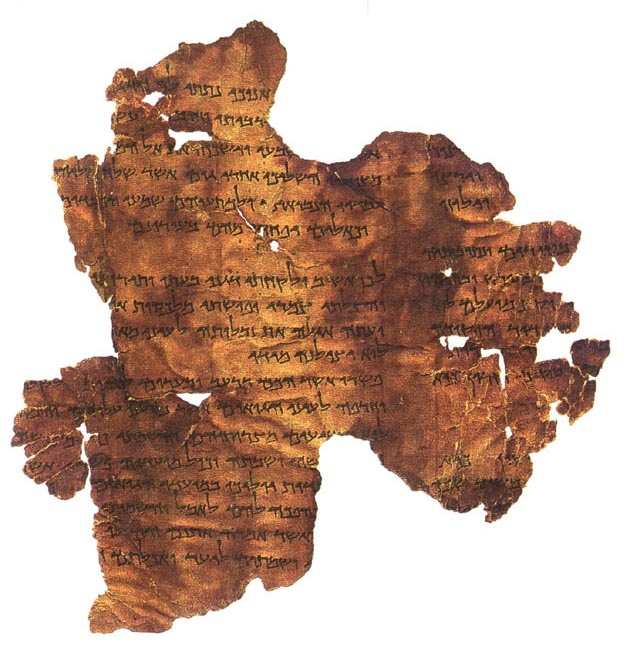
- 4Q166 "The Hosea Commentary Scroll", late first century B.C.
- Book: Book of Hosea
- Category: Nevi'im
- Christian Bible part: Old Testament
- Order in the Christian part: 28

Hosea 12 is the twelfth chapter of the Book of Hosea in the Hebrew Bible or the Old Testament of the Christian Bible. In the Hebrew Bible it is a part of the Book of the Twelve Minor Prophets. This chapter contains prophecies attributed to the prophet Hosea, son of Beeri, delivered about the time when the Kingdom of Israel (Ephraim) sought the aid of the Egyptian king So, in violation of her covenant with Assyria (Hosea 12:1). References to contemporary events sit alongside allusions to the patriarchal age in Israel's history. Hosea exhorts the country's leaders to follow their father Jacob's persevering prayerfulness, "which brought God's favor upon him". The Jamieson-Fausset-Brown Bible Commentary notes that "as God is unchangeable, He will show the same favor to Jacob's posterity as He did to Jacob, if, like him, they seek God".

== Text ==
The original text was written in Hebrew. This chapter is divided into 14 verses in English Christian Bibles, but 15 verses in the Hebrew Bible, which includes Hosea 11:12 as verse 1. This article generally follows the common numbering in Christian English Bible versions, with notes to the numbering in Hebrew Bible versions. For verse 1 in the Hebrew Bible see Hosea 11:12.

=== Textual witnesses ===
Some early manuscripts containing the text of this chapter in Hebrew are of the Masoretic Text tradition, which includes the Codex Cairensis (895), the Petersburg Codex of the Prophets (916), Aleppo Codex (10th century), Codex Leningradensis (1008). Fragments cumulatively containing all verses of this chapter in Hebrew were found among the Dead Sea Scrolls, including 4Q82 (4QXII^{g}; 25 BCE) with extant verses 1–14 (verses 1–15 in Masoretic Text).

There is also a translation into Koine Greek known as the Septuagint, made in the last few centuries BCE. Extant ancient manuscripts of the Septuagint version include Codex Vaticanus (B; $\mathfrak{G}$^{B}; 4th century), Codex Alexandrinus (A; $\mathfrak{G}$^{A}; 5th century) and Codex Marchalianus (Q; $\mathfrak{G}$^{Q}; 6th century). (Note: Book of Hosea is missing from the extant Codex Sinaiticus.)

== Contents and commentary ==
=== Verse 1 ===
"Ephraim feeds on the wind,

And pursues the east wind;

He daily increases lies and desolation.

Also they make a covenant with the Assyrians,

And oil is carried to Egypt.

- "East wind": in Palestine is coming from Arabia and the Far East, over large sandy area, scorching, destructive to vegetation Psalm 48:7, and also having the force of the whirlwind (Job 27:21; cf. Jeremiah 18:17).
- "Oil is carried into Egypt" refers to rich and precious oils used to procure Egypt's friendship. The Jamieson-Fausset-Brown Bible Commentary notes that "Palestine was famed for oil", cf. Ezekiel 27:17: Judah and Israel traded with you (Tyre); they exchanged wheat from Minnith and confections, honey, olive oil and balm for your wares. Isaiah's prophecies condemned such associations with Egypt.

=== Verses 3-5 ===
^{3} In the womb he took his brother by the heel,

and in his manhood he strove with God.

^{4} He strove with the angel and prevailed;

he wept and sought his favor.

He met God at Bethel,

and there God spoke with us—

^{5} the Lord, the God of hosts,

the Lord is his memorial name.

Hosea recalls events from the life and narrative of the patriarch Jacob from Genesis 25 (Jacob was born holding his brother Esau's heel), 28 (his dream at Bethel) and 32 (where Jacob wrestled with a man who blessed him). The Jerusalem Bible adds in verse 3 that he "supplanted his brother", a reference to him taking Esau's birthright for a bowl of stew (Genesis 27). For "he wept and sought his favour" (Hosea 12:4), the same version notes that "Genesis 32:24-28 does not speak of tears and entreaties: Hosea is probably hinting at some trick on Jacob's part."

=== Verse 9 ===
And I that am the Lord thy God from the land of Egypt

will yet make thee to dwell in tabernacles,
as in the days of the solemn feast.

This verse consists of two parts which in the original are coordinated. It is better to translate thus:

And I am the Lord thy God, from the land of Egypt:

I will yet make thee to dwell in tabernacles,
as in the days of the solemn feast.

Kimchi interprets the phrase "dwell in tabernacles" as a promise, perhaps rendered with an implied threat, that even so God is "ready to bring Israel forth out of the captivity where [they] will be, as God brought Israel forth out of the land of Egypt, and made them dwell in tents in the wilderness, God is ready again to bring Israel forth out of the lands of the Gentiles, to cause them to dwell in tents in the wilderness along the way, until they shall return to their land in peace".

- "As in the days of the solemn feast": alluding to the feast of tabernacles, which commemorates the Israelites dwelling in tents in the wilderness (Leviticus 23:42), which may refer to Jesus Christ's incarnation, expressed as 'his tabernacling' among men in human nature (John 1:14; cf. Zechariah 14:16). The materials to make the tabernacles are willows trees of the brook, palm trees, olive trees, and myrtle trees, according to Leviticus 23:40.

=== Verse 12 ===
And Jacob fled into the country of Syria,

and Israel served for a wife,
and for a wife he kept sheep.

The "country of Syria", or "field of Syria", (שדה ארם, śə-ḏêh 'ă-rām) is the same as "Padan-Aram" ("Padan" means "field" in Arabic and "Aram" is Syria), the place to which Jacob fled from Esau (Genesis 28:1). "Israel served for a wife, and for a wife he kept sheep" refers to the period which Jacob spent as a shepherd working for Laban, his uncle, to marry his two wives, Leah and Rachel, Laban's daughters. He served for seven years for each wife (Genesis 29:1–30).

=== Verse 13 ===
And by a prophet the Lord brought Israel out of Egypt,

and by a prophet was he preserved.

- "By a prophet" denotes Moses (Numbers 12:6–8; Deuteronomy 18:15, 18).
- "Preserved": or "kept"; there is an allusion to the same Hebrew word in Hosea 12:12, "kept sheep"; Israel was kept by God as His flock, even as Jacob kept sheep (Psalm 80:1; Isaiah 63:11).

== See also ==
- Assyria
- Gilead
- Gilgal
- Egypt
- Ephraim
- Jacob
- Israel
- Syria
- Related Bible parts: Genesis 35, Exodus 14, Jeremiah 7, Hosea 6, Hosea 7, Hosea 8, Hosea 9, Hosea 10

== Sources ==
- Collins, John J. (2014). Introduction to the Hebrew Scriptures. Fortress Press. ISBN 9781451469233.
- Day, John (2007). "27. Hosea". In Barton, John; Muddiman, John (eds.). The Oxford Bible Commentary (first (paperback) ed.). Oxford University Press. pp. 571–578. ISBN 978-0199277186.
- Fitzmyer, Joseph A. (2008). A Guide to the Dead Sea Scrolls and Related Literature. Grand Rapids, MI: William B. Eerdmans Publishing Company. ISBN 9780802862419.
- Hayes, Christine (2015). Introduction to the Bible. Yale University Press. ISBN 978-0300188271.
- Ulrich, Eugene, ed. (2010). The Biblical Qumran Scrolls: Transcriptions and Textual Variants. Brill.
- Würthwein, Ernst (1995). The Text of the Old Testament. Translated by Rhodes, Erroll F. Grand Rapids, MI: Wm. B. Eerdmans. ISBN 0-8028-0788-7.
