= Hosea 11 =

- ← chapter 10 chapter 12 →
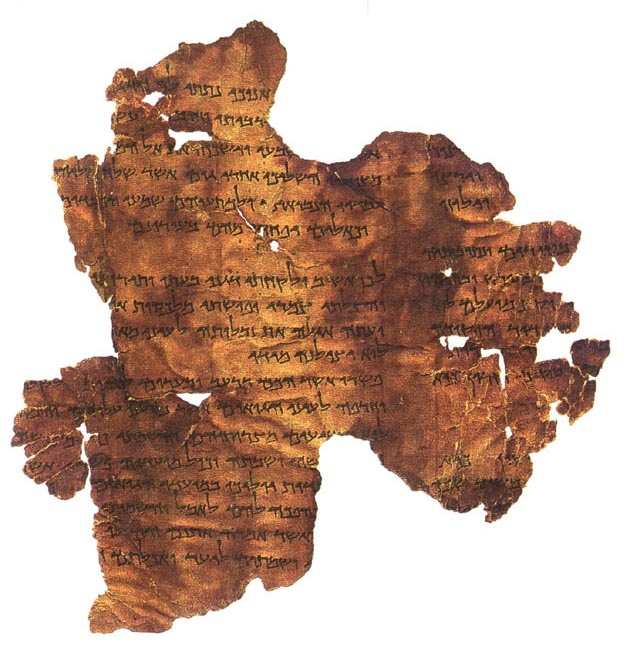
- 4Q166 "The Hosea Commentary Scroll", late first century B.C.
- Book: Book of Hosea
- Category: Nevi'im
- Christian Bible part: Old Testament
- Order in the Christian part: 28

Hosea 11, the eleventh chapter of the Book of Hosea in the Hebrew Bible or the Old Testament of the Christian Bible, has been called "one of the high points in the Old Testament". In the Hebrew Bible is a part of the Book of the Twelve Minor Prophets. According to the Jamieson-Fausset-Brown Bible Commentary, this chapter contains prophecies attributed to the prophet Hosea, son of Beeri, about God's former benefits, and Israel's ingratitude resulting in punishment, but God still promises restoration.

== Text ==
The original text was written in Hebrew. This chapter is divided into 12 verses in Christian Bibles, but 11 verses in the Hebrew Bible, with verse 12 transferred to the start of chapter 12. This article generally follows the common numbering in Christian English Bible versions, with notes to the numbering in Hebrew Bible versions.

=== Textual witnesses ===
Some early manuscripts containing the text of this chapter in Hebrew are of the Masoretic Text tradition, which includes the Codex Cairensis (895), the Petersburg Codex of the Prophets (916), Aleppo Codex (10th century), Codex Leningradensis (1008). Fragments containing parts of this chapter in Hebrew were found among the Dead Sea Scrolls, including 4Q82 (4QXII^{g}; 25 BCE) with extant verses 2–12 (verse 11:12 = 12:1 in Masoretic Text).

There is also a translation into Koine Greek known as the Septuagint, made in the last few centuries BCE. Extant ancient manuscripts of the Septuagint version include Codex Vaticanus (B; $\mathfrak{G}$^{B}; 4th century), Codex Alexandrinus (A; $\mathfrak{G}$^{A}; 5th century) and Codex Marchalianus (Q; $\mathfrak{G}$^{Q}; 6th century). (Note: The Book of Hosea is missing from the extant Codex Sinaiticus.)

== God's love for Israel (11:1–11) ==
Biblical scholar John Day describes this section as portraying God's "inextinguishable" love, leading him to call it "one of the high points in the Old Testament".

=== Verse 1 ===
When Israel was a child, I loved him,

and out of Egypt I called My son.

- "And out of Egypt I called My son": or "From the time that he (Israel) was in Egypt, I called him My son," (according to Bengel) in parallel to the use of "from the land of Egypt" in Hosea 12:9 and Hosea 13:4. Exodus 4:22 shows that Israel was called "My son" by God from the period of Egyptian sojourn (Isaiah 43:1) and God is always said to "have led" or "brought forth", not to have "called", Israel from Egypt. Matthew 2:15 quotes this prophecy for Jesus' sojourn in Egypt, not His return from it. The same general reason, that is, the danger of extinction, caused Israel in its national infancy and the infant Jesus (cf. Genesis 42:1–43:34; 45:18; 46:3, 4; Ezekiel 16:4–6; Jeremiah 31:20) to sojourn in Egypt.
- The verse has two textual variants: one is the standard reading of "Out of Egypt I called my son" and a second is found in the Greek Septuagint "Out of Egypt I called his children", which is likely based on a small variation of benei, "my son", in the Hebrew Masoretic Text, to beneiu, "his children", as a possible source of the Septuagint reading.

=== Verse 8 ===
How can I give you up, Ephraim?

How can I hand you over, Israel?

How can I make you like Admah?

How can I set you like Zeboiim?

My heart churns within Me;

My sympathy is stirred.

- Admah and Zeboim were cities in the same plain as Sodom and Gomorrah, each with a king (Genesis 14:2) and, although they are not mentioned by name in the narrative in Genesis, were destroyed together with Sodom and Gomorrah, as recorded in a general term "those cities and all the plain" (Genesis 19:25) or later in detail "...that the whole land thereof is brimstone and salt and burning, ... like the overthrow of Sodom and Gomorrah, Admah and Zeboim, which the Lord overthrew in His anger and His wrath" (Deuteronomy 29:22–23). The editors of the Jerusalem Bible link "Sodom and Gomorrah" with the Yahwistic tradition and "Admah and Zeboim" with the Elohistic tradition.
- "My heart churns within Me": or "my heart is within me changed", that is, 'from anger to pity'.
- "My sympathy is stirred": from Hebrew: נכמרו נחומי, niḵ-mə-rū ni-khū-māy; almost the same phrase is found in Genesis 43:30, Hebrew: נכמרו רחמיו, niḵ-mə-rū ra-khă-māw, 'his [Joseph's] compassion [bowels] were overcome [towards his brother].' The word rendered "is stirred" or "were overcome" (nik’meru), according to Rashi, "one warmed", has a close affinity with the Assyrian kamâru, "to throw down", as in Hosea 10:5 for k’mârîm, "(idolatrous) priests". The word for "sympathy" is from Hebrew nikhumim, from Piel נִחֵם, a noun of הבוד, less definite than rakhamim, "bowels", as "the seat of the emotions".

Verses 8–9 form one of the most moving passages in the Hebrew Bible, where God struggles with the anguish of his love, that he cannot totally destroy Israel as he did Admah and Zeboim.

=== Verse 10 ===
They shall walk after the Lord.

He will roar like a lion.

When He roars,

Then His sons shall come trembling from the west.

Day thinks this verse is probably a later addition.

== God’s charge against Ephraim (11:12) ==
(Verse 12:1 in the Hebrew Bible)

Ephraim has surrounded Me with lies,

and the house of Israel with deceit.

But Judah still walks with God,

and is faithful to the Holy One.

- "Holy One" or "holy ones".

An allusion to Israel's lies and deceit, which also mentions Judah. It resonates with Hosea 12:1, 3, 7.

== Imagery in Hosea 11 ==
Modern scholars have examined the father–son imagery in the Hosea chapter 11 in light of Ancient Near Eastern conceptions of divine kingship and vassal treaties. Gili Kugler argues that Hosea 11 reflects a hybrid metaphor, combining elements of both royal adoption and political subjugation. In her analysis, Israel functions as a “divine vassal,” adopted by God, yet bound by the same legal-moral obligations that defined a vassal’s loyalty to a suzerain. This status grants Israel privilege and protection but also leaves it vulnerable to punishment and loss when disobedient. According to Kugler, the chapter’s oscillation between tenderness (vv. 1–4, 8–9) and threat (vv. 5–7) mirrors the tension between divine compassion and covenantal conditionality characteristic of Ancient Near Eastern political relationships.

== See also ==
- Assyria
- Ephraim
- Judah
- Old Testament messianic prophecies quoted in the New Testament
- Samaria
- Related Bible parts: Genesis 14, Genesis 19, Exodus 4, Deuteronomy 29, Hosea 6, Hosea 7, Hosea 8, Hosea 9, Hosea 10, Matthew 2

== Sources ==
- Collins, John J. (2014). Introduction to the Hebrew Scriptures. Fortress Press. ISBN 9781451469233.
- Day, John (2007). "27. Hosea". In Barton, John; Muddiman, John (eds.). The Oxford Bible Commentary (first (paperback) ed.). Oxford University Press. pp. 571–578. ISBN 978-0199277186.
- Fitzmyer, Joseph A. (2008). A Guide to the Dead Sea Scrolls and Related Literature. Grand Rapids, MI: William B. Eerdmans Publishing Company. ISBN 9780802862419.
- Hayes, Christine (2015). Introduction to the Bible. Yale University Press. ISBN 978-0300188271.
- Ulrich, Eugene, ed. (2010). The Biblical Qumran Scrolls: Transcriptions and Textual Variants. Brill.
- Würthwein, Ernst (1995). The Text of the Old Testament. Translated by Rhodes, Erroll F. Grand Rapids, MI: Wm. B. Eerdmans. ISBN 0-8028-0788-7.
