= Hosea 13 =

Chapter 13 of the Book of Hosea

- ← chapter 12 chapter 14 →
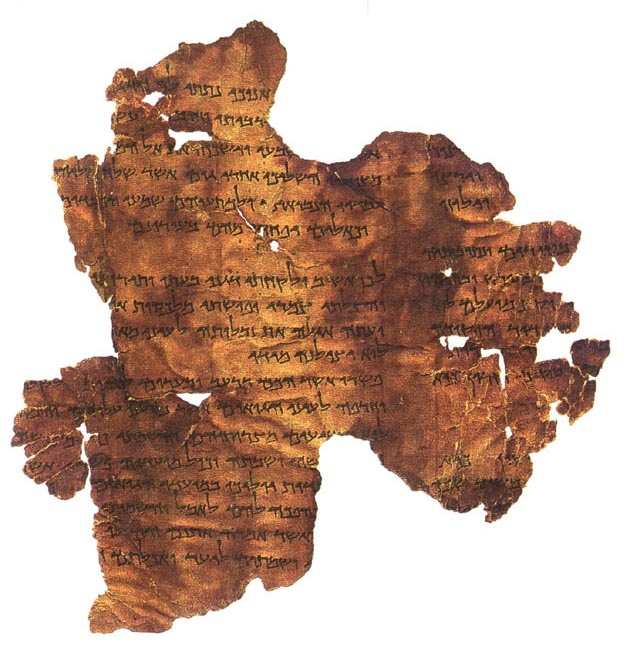
- 4Q166 "The Hosea Commentary Scroll", late first century B.C.
- Book: Book of Hosea
- Category: Nevi'im
- Christian Bible part: Old Testament
- Order in the Christian part: 28

Hosea 13 is the thirteenth chapter of the Book of Hosea in the Hebrew Bible or the Old Testament of the Christian Bible. In the Hebrew Bible it is part of the Book of the Twelve Minor Prophets. The subject of this chapter and the following one is the idolatry of the Kingdom of Israel, referred to as Ephraim (Samaria in verse 16), notwithstanding God's past benefits, destined to be the country's ruin.

== Text ==
The original text was written in Hebrew. This chapter is divided into 16 verses in English Christian Bibles, but 15 verses in the Hebrew Bible, where verse 16 is numbered as Hosea 14:1. (Note: In the 1611 King James Version, Hosea 13 has sixteen verses, followed by Hosea 14 with nine. This is also the case in modern English translations of the Bible. The current Roman Catholic translations of the Bible place Hosea 13:16 as the beginning of chapter 14, which has a total number of ten verses.) This article generally follows the common numbering in Christian English Bible versions, with notes to the numbering in Hebrew Bible versions.

=== Textual witnesses ===
Some early manuscripts containing the text of this chapter in Hebrew are of the Masoretic Text tradition, which includes the Codex Cairensis (895), the Petersburg Codex of the Prophets (916), Aleppo Codex (10th century), Codex Leningradensis (1008). Fragments containing parts of this chapter were found among the Dead Sea Scrolls, including 4Q78 (4QXII^{c}; 75–50 BCE) with extant verses 3–10, 15–16 (verse 13:16 = 14:1 in Masoretic text); and 4Q82 (4QXII^{g}; 25 BCE) with extant verses 1, 6–8?, 11–13.

There is also a translation into Koine Greek known as the Septuagint, made in the last few centuries BCE. Extant ancient manuscripts of the Septuagint version include Codex Vaticanus (B; $\mathfrak{G}$^{B}; 4th century), Codex Alexandrinus (A; $\mathfrak{G}$^{A}; 5th century) and Codex Marchalianus (Q; $\mathfrak{G}$^{Q}; 6th century). (Note: The Book of Hosea is missing from the extant Codex Sinaiticus.)

== Context ==
The Jamieson-Fausset-Brown Bible Commentary suggests that chapters 13 and 14 "probably belong to the troubled times that followed Pekah's murder by Hoshea". Pekah was the eighteenth and penultimate king of Israel; Hoshea succeeded him in or around 732 BC. The Deuteronomistic history records the event in 2 Kings 15:30.

== Contents and commentary ==
=== Verse 1 ===
When Ephraim spoke, trembling,

he was exalted in Israel.

But he incurred guilt through Baal worship and he died.

- "When Ephraim spoke, trembling, he was exalted in Israel": This rendering is supported by the Syriac version: "When Ephraim spake trembling, then he was, and was great in Israel." The Chaldee version supports this rendering with a paraphrase: "When one of the house of Ephraim spake, trembling seized the peoples".
- "Ephraim": refer to the region of Mount Ephraim, where the royal residence of Samaria was located, instead of the tribe of Ephraim, functioning as a synecdoche of location for its inhabitants (the king of Samaria; cf. Hosea 5:13; 8:8, 10).
- "Trembling": from Hebrew word רתת, retheth, which is not found elsewhere (hapax legomenon) and can be rendered as: "there was trembling". This word has a cognate root in Aramaic with the assigned meaning "to fear, shudder, tremble". It is attested in 1QH 4:33, meaning “trembling” and used as a synonym with רַעַד, raʿad, "quaking", which appears in Mishnaic Hebrew for the meaning "trembling", as also reflected in the Greek recensions of Aquila, Symmachus, and Theodotion, as well as Jerome’s Latin Vulgate. The word רֶטֶט, re-ṭeṭ, in Jeremiah 49:24, meaning "fear", is similar in both sense and sound. The Greek Septuagint renders the word as δικαιώματα, dikaiomata, to read: "According to the word of Ephraim, be adopted ordinances for himself in Israel," that is, "when Ephraim spoke, the rest of the Israelites assented to his ordinances and rights, reverencing his authority".
- "Exalted": from Hebrew נשא, nasaʾ (Qal perfect third person masculine singular, following Masoretic Text), "lifted up," that is, his head, as in "exalted himself". Usually the Hithphil form that is used for this sense, but the Qal form is also used (cf. Psalm 89:10; Nahum 1:5). The Septuagint and Syriac reflect a vocalization tradition of נִשָּׂא, nisaʾ (Niphal perfect third person masculine singular), "he was exalted".
- "Offended in Baal": that is, "in respect to Baal, by worshipping him" (1 Kings 16:31), such as under Ahab, so at this climax of guilt, Ephraim "died" (cf. Romans 7:9). Adam was to die in the day of his sin, although this was not visibly executed until later (Genesis 2:17; 5:5), and Israel is similarly represented as politically dead in Ezekiel 37:1-28. Ephraim's glory vanished because of idolatry.

=== Verse 4 ===
But I am the Lord your God from the land of Egypt;
you know no God but me,
and besides me there is no savior.

- "No God but Me": As in the song of Moses, God says, "See now that I, I am He, and there is no God with Me:..." (Deuteronomy 32:39). Isaiah repeats this same, "Is there a God besides Me? yea there is no God; I know not any" Isaiah 44:8; and "There is no God else besides Me, a just God and a Saviour; there is none else. Look unto Me and be ye saved, for I am God and there is none else" Isaiah 45:21, Isaiah 45:2; and, "I am the Lord, that is My Name; and My glory will I not give to another; neither My praise to graven images" Isaiah 42:8. : "That God and Saviour is Christ; God, because He created; Saviour, because, being made Man, He saved. Whence He willed to be called Jesus, i. e., Saviour. Truly "beside" Him, "there is no Saviour; neither is there salvation in any other, for there is none other name under heaven, given among men, whereby we must be saved" Acts 4:12. "It is not enough to recognize in God this quality of a Saviour. It must not be shared with "any other." Whoso associates with God any power whatever to decide on man's salvation makes an idol, and introduces a new God."

=== Verse 9 ===
O Israel, thou hast destroyed thyself;

but in me is thine help.

- "Thou hast destroyed thyself": from Hebrew שִׁחֶתְךָ, shikhetekha (Piel perfect third person masculine singular from שָׁחַת, shakhat, "to destroy" with second person masculine singular suffix), literally, "he destroyed you". It may be rendered, "it has destroyed you"; "It" could refer to either the calf (supported by Kimchi), or the 'idolatry' or a king, or rather to all the sins of Israel.

=== Verse 11 ===
I gave you a king in My anger,
And took him away in My wrath.

This verse is seen by the Jamieson-Fausset-Brown Bible Commentary as indicative of Hosea's historical context.

=== Verse 14 ===
"I will ransom them from the power of the grave;

I will redeem them from death.

O Death, I will be your plagues!

O Grave, I will be your destruction!

Pity is hidden from My eyes."

- Cited in 1 Corinthians 15:55
- "Power": or "hand".
- "Grave": from Hebrew "Sheol".
- "I will be your plagues": rendered in Septuagint as "where is your punishment?"
- "I will be your destruction!" rendered in Septuagint as "where is your sting?"

This verse shows that Israel is in the grip of Death (mawet) and grave (Sheol), but with the lack of interrogative particle ha, it has the positive meaning: "I shall ransom them from the power of Sheol", as followed by Paul in 1 Corinthians 15:55. The New Living Translation puts this in another way: "Should I ransom them from the grave? Should I redeem them from death? / O death, bring on your terrors! O grave, bring on your plagues! For I will not take pity on them."

=== Verse 16 ===
Samaria shall become desolate;

for she hath rebelled against her God:

they shall fall by the sword:

their infants shall be dashed in pieces,
and their women with child shall be ripped up.

This verse is numbered as Hosea 14:1 in the Masoretic text, where the pronouns "their" are in the singular, "her".

== See also ==
- Baal
- Egypt
- Ephraim
- Samaria
- Related Bible parts: Hosea 6, Hosea 7, Hosea 8, Hosea 9, Hosea 10, Hosea 11, 1 Corinthians 15

== Sources ==
- Collins, John J. (2014). Introduction to the Hebrew Scriptures. Fortress Press. ISBN 9781451469233.
- Day, John (2007). "27. Hosea". In Barton, John; Muddiman, John (eds.). The Oxford Bible Commentary (first (paperback) ed.). Oxford University Press. pp. 571–578. ISBN 978-0199277186.
- Fitzmyer, Joseph A. (2008). A Guide to the Dead Sea Scrolls and Related Literature. Grand Rapids, MI: William B. Eerdmans Publishing Company. ISBN 9780802862419.
- Hayes, Christine (2015). Introduction to the Bible. Yale University Press. ISBN 978-0300188271.
- Ulrich, Eugene, ed. (2010). The Biblical Qumran Scrolls: Transcriptions and Textual Variants. Brill.
- Würthwein, Ernst (1995). The Text of the Old Testament. Translated by Rhodes, Erroll F. Grand Rapids, MI: Wm. B. Eerdmans. ISBN 0-8028-0788-7.
