= Hosea 10 =

- ← chapter 9 chapter 11 →
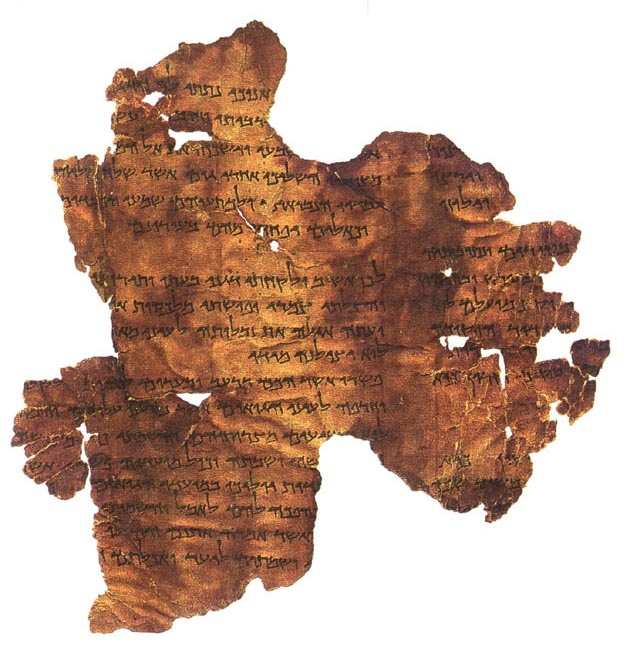
- 4Q166 "The Hosea Commentary Scroll", late first century B.C.
- Book: Book of Hosea
- Category: Nevi'im
- Christian Bible part: Old Testament
- Order in the Christian part: 28

Hosea 10 is the tenth chapter of the Book of Hosea in the Hebrew Bible or the Old Testament of the Christian Bible. In the Hebrew Bible it is a part of the Book of the Twelve Minor Prophets. This chapter contains prophecies attributed to the prophet Hosea, son of Beeri, dated by the Jamieson-Fausset-Brown Bible Commentary to the period between Shalmaneser V's first and second invasions of Israel. Israel is reproved and threatened for its impiety and idolatry, and exhorted to repentance (cf. Hosea 10:14; Hosea 10:6 referring to Hoshea's calling pharaoh So of Egypt to his aid; also Hosea 10:4, 13).

== Text ==
The original text was written in Hebrew. This chapter is divided into 15 verses.

=== Textual witnesses ===
Some early manuscripts containing the text of this chapter in Hebrew are of the Masoretic Text tradition, which includes the Codex Cairensis (895), the Petersburg Codex of the Prophets (916), Aleppo Codex (10th century), Codex Leningradensis (1008). Fragments containing parts of this chapter in Hebrew were found among the Dead Sea Scrolls, including 4Q82 (4QXII^{g}; 25 BCE) with extant verses 1–14.

There is also a translation into Koine Greek known as the Septuagint, made in the last few centuries BCE. Extant ancient manuscripts of the Septuagint version include Codex Vaticanus (B; $\mathfrak{G}$^{B}; 4th century), Codex Alexandrinus (A; $\mathfrak{G}$^{A}; 5th century) and Codex Marchalianus (Q; $\mathfrak{G}$^{Q}; 6th century). (Note: The Book of Hosea is missing from the extant Codex Sinaiticus.)

== Contents and commentary ==
=== Verse 1 ===
Israel is an empty vine, he bringeth forth fruit unto himself: according to the multitude of his fruit he hath increased the altars; according to the goodness of his land they have made goodly images.

Charles Ellicott's commentary argues that "Empty in the English version is wrong, being inconsistent with what follows" and suggests "luxuriant" as a preferable translation. Many more recent translations than the King James Version have adopted this usage.

=== Verse 8 ===
The high places also of Aven, the sin of Israel, shall be destroyed:

the thorn and the thistle shall come up on their altars;

and they shall say to the mountains, Cover us;

and to the hills, Fall on us.

- "The high places also of Aven": The name "Aven": generally considered an abbreviation of "Beth-aven", that is, "Bethel"; but when the word is taken as an appellative, "bamoth-aven" would signify the "high places of iniquity" for idol sacrifices to fit the characterization of "the sin of Israel."
- "They shall say to the mountains, Cover us": describing a terrible calamity, that people would prefer death to life (Luke 23:30; Revelation 6:16; 9:6). Those hills where the idolatrous altars once stood as one source of their confidence for help, beside their "king" (Hosea 10:7), will be called on by the people to fall on them.

=== Verse 12 ===
Sow for yourselves righteousness; reap steadfast love; break up your fallow ground, for it is the time to seek the Lord, that he may come and rain righteousness upon you.

The Latin words Innovate vobis novale are reflected in the ICB's translation, Break new ground. It is noteworthy that Aramaic translations of the Book of Hosea include an instruction to "light a lamp" in advance of the line "it is time to seek the LORD".

=== Verse 14 ===
Therefore shall a tumult arise among thy people,

and all thy fortresses shall be spoiled,

as Shalman spoiled Betharbel in the day of battle:

the mother was dashed in pieces upon her children.

- "Shalman": generally identified with "Shalmaneser king of Assyria," who made king Hoshea, early in his reign, to be "a servant" and "brought him a present" (2 Kings 17:3). Another identification is with "Shalman" who was listed in the Summary Inscription Seven of the Assyrian King Tiglath-Pileser III (r. about 745 to 727 BCE) as a tributary king of Moab, Salamanu (r. circa 750 to 740 BCE). André Lemaire, a French historian and philologist notable for his work on the Mesha Stele, supports the identification of Shalman as the king of Moab, because it fits his analysis of another Moabite inscription found in 2003 (currently housed at the Israel Museum) that may in fact describe the wider setting of the battle of Beth-Arbel as it contains notable parallels to the Mesha Stele and describes a victory over the neighboring Ammonite kingdom. Shmuel Ahituv, the first epigraphist to analyze the artifact, suggests that the Moabite invasion of Ammon occurred during the reign of Israel's king Jeroboam II, who was mentioned in Hosea 1:1. Lemaire identifies this Moabite king as King Salamanu/"Shalman" from the Assyrian tribute list, which fits a wider picture for Hosea 10:14.
- "Beth-Arbel": Jewish commentators, Kimchi and Ben Melech, suggest that Arbel was the name of a great man in those days, whose family (referred to by the word "beth" or "a house") was reported to be destroyed in this verse. It is generally identified as a city which later called "Arbela" by the Greeks; one suggested location places it about 15 miles west of Nazareth, and 10 miles from Jezreel, thus it should lay somewhere in the middle of the valley of Jezreel, and can be linked to the fulfillment of Hosea's earlier prophecy that "God brake the bow of Israel in the valley of Jezreel" (Hosea 1:5). Another suggested location places it in northeast Israel (perhaps in the land of Gilead), east of the Jordan River with the likely contender the modern Jordanian city of Irbid, in the northwest corner of Jordan, because Irbid was known to the ancient Greeks as "Arbela". The later identification places it in the territory of ancient kingdom of Ammon which would fit the history of a king of Moab in the 2003 Moabite inscription, who attacked Ammon during the time of Jeroboam II and possibly took Beth-Arbel in the invasion.

== See also ==
- Assyria
- Beth-aven
- Bethel
- Ephraim
- Gibeah
- Jacob
- Judah
- Israel
- Samaria
- Shalman
- Related Bible parts: Hosea 6, Hosea 7, Hosea 8, Hosea 9, Luke 23, Revelation 6

== Sources ==
- Collins, John J. (2014). Introduction to the Hebrew Scriptures. Fortress Press. ISBN 978-1-4514-6923-3.
- Day, John (2007). "27. Hosea". In Barton, John; Muddiman, John (eds.). The Oxford Bible Commentary (first (paperback) ed.). Oxford University Press. pp. 571–578. ISBN 978-0-19-927718-6.
- Fitzmyer, Joseph A. (2008). A Guide to the Dead Sea Scrolls and Related Literature. Grand Rapids, MI: William B. Eerdmans Publishing Company. ISBN 978-0-8028-6241-9.
- Hayes, Christine (2015). Introduction to the Bible. Yale University Press. ISBN 978-0-300-18827-1.
- Ulrich, Eugene, ed. (2010). The Biblical Qumran Scrolls: Transcriptions and Textual Variants. Brill.
- Würthwein, Ernst (1995). The Text of the Old Testament. Translated by Rhodes, Erroll F. Grand Rapids, MI: Wm. B. Eerdmans. ISBN 0-8028-0788-7.
