= Hosea 5 =

- ← chapter 4 chapter 6 →
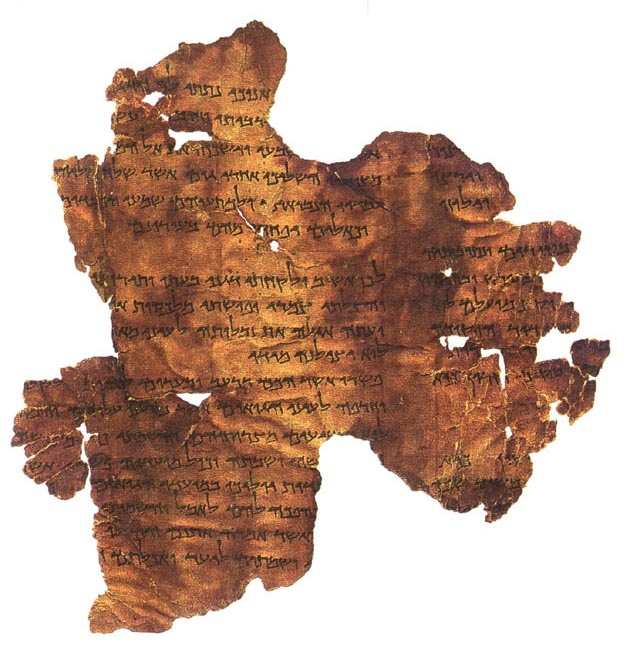
- 4Q166 "The Hosea Commentary Scroll", late first century B.C.
- Book: Book of Hosea
- Category: Nevi'im
- Christian Bible part: Old Testament
- Order in the Christian part: 28

Hosea 5 is the fifth chapter of the Book of Hosea in the Hebrew Bible or the Old Testament of the Christian Bible. In the Hebrew Bible it is a part of the Book of the Twelve Minor Prophets. The book contains the prophecies attributed to the prophet Hosea, son of Beeri, and this chapter is about God's judgments against the priests, the people, and the princes of Israel, for their multiple sins (Hosea 5:1-14), until they repent (Hosea 5:15), a topic which continues to chapter 6.

== Text ==
The original text was written in Hebrew. This chapter is divided into 15 verses. Some early manuscripts containing the text of this chapter in Hebrew are of the Masoretic Text tradition, which includes the Codex Cairensis (895), the Petersburg Codex of the Prophets (916), Aleppo Codex (10th century), Codex Leningradensis (1008). Fragments containing parts of this chapter in Hebrew were found among the Dead Sea Scrolls, including 4Q78 (4QXII^{c}; 75–50 BCE) with extant verse 1.

There is also a translation into Koine Greek known as the Septuagint, made in the last few centuries BCE. Extant ancient manuscripts of the Septuagint version include Codex Vaticanus (B; $\mathfrak{G}$^{B}; 4th century), Codex Alexandrinus (A; $\mathfrak{G}$^{A}; 5th century) and Codex Marchalianus (Q; $\mathfrak{G}$^{Q}; 6th century). (Note: The Book of Hosea is missing from the extant Codex Sinaiticus.)

== Contents and commentary ==
=== Verse 1 ===
Hear this, O priests!

Pay attention, O house of Israel!

Listen, O house of the king!

For the judgment is for you,

because you have been a snare at Mizpah

and a net spread over Tabor,

- "Priests ... house of Israel ...house of the king": the Pulpit Commentary interprets this call inclusively, as being addressed to "all the estates of the realm - priests, people, and princes ... the rulers and the ruled, the spiritual teachers and the taught". No one was to be exempted. However, John Day considers the mention of the "house of Israel" between the priests and the royal household to be "odd" wording.
- "The king": probably refers to Pekah (the contemporary of Ahaz, king of Judah) who first carried the idolatry far in Judah, while calling for joint Syrian and Israelite invasion, as also that of Assyria.
- "A snare on Mizpah, and a net spread over Tabor": Mizpah and Tabor refer to two high mountains in the northern land of Israel, which, according to Joseph ben Gorion, almost four miles high, had on the top of it a plain of almost three miles (or three and a quarter miles according to Josephus; Jeremiah 46:18), and where altars were set up to ensnare and draw people into idolatry.
- "Mizpah": the place of the solemn covenant between Jacob and Laban, and of his signal protection by God, lay in the mountainous part of Gilead on the East of Jordan. Mizpah, being a sacred place in the history of the patriarch Jacob (Genesis 31:23–49), was probably, like Gilgal and other sacred places, desecrated by idolatry.
- "Tabor": a mountain in Galilee, between the tribal territories of Issachar and Zebulun, 6 miles (9.7 km) from Nazareth, regarded the same as the Mountain of the Transfiguration in the midst of the plain of Jezreel or Esdraelon, one thousand feet high, in the form of a sugarloaf. Jerome wrote that birds were still snared on this mountain. Tabor was the scene of God's deliverance of Israel by Barak (Judges 4). There, by encouraging idolatries, they became hunters, not pastors, of souls (Ezekiel 13:18, Ezekiel 13:20).

=== Verse 13 ===
When Ephraim saw his sickness,

and Judah saw his wound,

then went Ephraim to the Assyrian, and sent to king Jareb:

yet could he not heal you, nor cure you of your wound.

- "went Ephraim to the Assyrian": First, Menahem (2 Kings 15:19) applied to Pul; again, Hoshea to Shalmaneser (2 Kings 17:3).
- "king Jareb": can be rendered as "a king who should plead" or "an avenging king", "hostile king", which may refer to the same Assyrian Monarch courted by both Israel and Judah, leading to the destruction of Israel and the weakening of Judah. Ahaz king of Judah did ask Tiglath-Pileser king of Assyria to come and save him ("I am thy servant and thy son; come up and save me out of the hand of the king of Syria, and out of the hand of the king of Israel, which rise up against me"; 2 Kings 16:7-8), yet "the Lord brought Judah low; and Tiglath-Pileser king of Assyria came unto him and distressed him, but strengthened him not" (2 Chronicles 28:19-20). Ahaz emptied his own treasures, and pillaged the house of God, in order to buy the help of the Assyrian, and he taught him an evil lesson against himself, of his wealth and his weakness. God had said that, if they were faithful, "five shall chase an hundred, and an hundred put ten thousand to flight" (Leviticus 26:8). God had pronounced him cursed, who trusted in man, and made flesh his arm, and whose heart departed from the Lord" (Jeremiah 17:5), like the king of Judah.

== See also ==
- Assyria
- Benjamin
- Beth-aven
- Ephraim
- Gibeah
- Israel
- Judah
- Mizpah
- Ramah
- Tabor
- Related Bible parts: Hosea 4, Hosea 6, James 4

== Sources ==
- Collins, John J. (2014). Introduction to the Hebrew Scriptures. Fortress Press. ISBN 9781451469233.
- Day, John (2007). "27. Hosea". In Barton, John; Muddiman, John (eds.). The Oxford Bible Commentary (first (paperback) ed.). Oxford University Press. pp. 571–578. ISBN 978-0199277186.
- Fitzmyer, Joseph A. (2008). A Guide to the Dead Sea Scrolls and Related Literature. Grand Rapids, MI: William B. Eerdmans Publishing Company. ISBN 9780802862419.
- Hayes, Christine (2015). Introduction to the Bible. Yale University Press. ISBN 978-0300188271.
- Ulrich, Eugene, ed. (2010). The Biblical Qumran Scrolls: Transcriptions and Textual Variants. Brill.
- Würthwein, Ernst (1995). The Text of the Old Testament. Translated by Rhodes, Erroll F. Grand Rapids, MI: Wm. B. Eerdmans. ISBN 0-8028-0788-7.
