= Hosea 4 =

- ← Hosea 3 Hosea 5 →
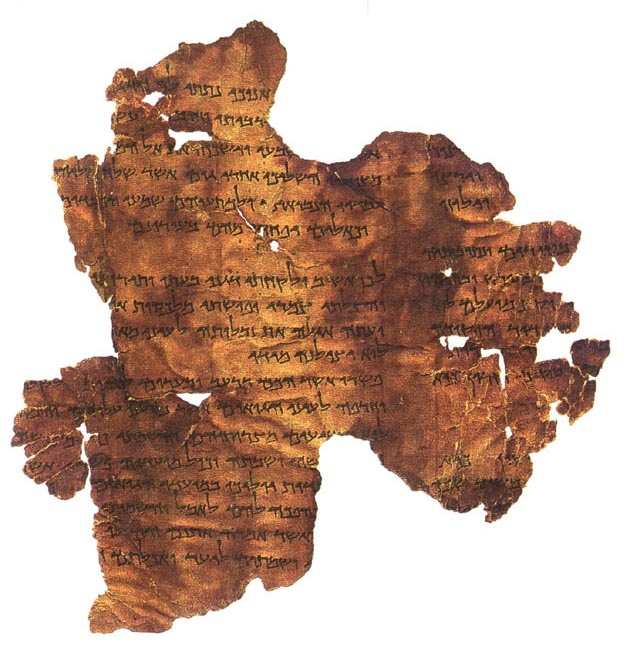
- 4Q166 "The Hosea Commentary Scroll", late first century B.C.
- Book: Book of Hosea
- Category: Early Prophets
- Christian Bible part: Old Testament
- Order in the Christian part: 28

Hosea 4 is the fourth chapter of the Book of Hosea in the Hebrew Bible or the Old Testament of the Christian Bible. This book contains the prophecies attributed to the prophet Hosea, son of Beeri. In this chapter he reproves the people and priests for their sins in the interregnum following Jeroboam's death; hence there is no mention of the king or his family; and in Hosea 4:2 bloodshed and other evils usual in a civil war are specified. It is a part of the Book of the Twelve Minor Prophets.

== Text ==
The original text was written in Hebrew language. This chapter is divided into 19 verses.

=== Textual witnesses ===
Some early manuscripts containing the text of this chapter in Hebrew are of the Masoretic Text tradition, which includes the Codex Cairensis (895), the Petersburg Codex of the Prophets (916), Aleppo Codex (10th century), Codex Leningradensis (1008). Fragments containing parts of this chapter in Hebrew were found among the Dead Sea Scrolls including 4Q78 (4QXII^{c}; 75–50 BCE) with extant verses 1–19; and 4Q82 (4QXII^{g}; 25 BCE) with extant verses 1, 9–11, 13–14.

There is also a translation into Koine Greek known as the Septuagint, made in the last few centuries BCE. Extant ancient manuscripts of the Septuagint version include Codex Vaticanus (B; $\mathfrak{G}$^{B}; 4th century), Codex Alexandrinus (A; $\mathfrak{G}$^{A}; 5th century) and Codex Marchalianus (Q; $\mathfrak{G}$^{Q}; 6th century). (Note: The Book of Hosea is missing from the extant Codex Sinaiticus.)

== Verse 6 ==
My people are destroyed for lack of knowledge:
Because you have rejected knowledge,

I also will reject you from being priest for Me

Because you have forgotten the law of your God,

I also will forget your children.

- "Are destroyed": from the Hebrew plural verb נִדְמ֥וּ, nidmu, following a singular subject, collectively include the whole nation of Israel. Jerome rendered the verb in the sense of "silence" (Latin: "conticuit populus incus", that is, "sinking into eternal silence"; as supported by the Chaldee version). The Greek Septuagint interpret it in the sense of "likeness": "My people are like (ὡμοιώθη) as if they had no knowledge." Isaiah 5:13 uses the same expression, "therefore my people are gone into captivity, because they have no knowledge".
- "Lack of knowledge": "of God" (Hosea 4:1), that is, "lack of piety".
- "You have rejected knowledge": may refer to the priests appointed by Jeroboam not from among the Levites, but 'of the lowest of the people, ignorant and illiterate men' (1 Kings 12:31) who reject with contempt the knowledge of God and of divine things.

== See also ==
- Beth-aven
- Ephraim
- Gilgal
- Israel
- Related Bible parts: Isaiah 5, Hosea 3

== Sources ==
- Collins, John J. (2014). Introduction to the Hebrew Scriptures. Fortress Press. ISBN 9781451469233.
- Day, John (2007). "27. Hosea". In Barton, John; Muddiman, John (eds.). The Oxford Bible Commentary (first (paperback) ed.). Oxford University Press. pp. 571–578. ISBN 978-0199277186.
- Fitzmyer, Joseph A. (2008). A Guide to the Dead Sea Scrolls and Related Literature. Grand Rapids, MI: William B. Eerdmans Publishing Company. ISBN 9780802862419.
- Hayes, Christine (2015). Introduction to the Bible. Yale University Press. ISBN 978-0300188271.
- Ulrich, Eugene, ed. (2010). The Biblical Qumran Scrolls: Transcriptions and Textual Variants. Brill.
- Würthwein, Ernst (1995). The Text of the Old Testament. Translated by Rhodes, Erroll F. Grand Rapids, MI: Wm. B. Eerdmans. ISBN 0-8028-0788-7.
