= Hosea 3 =

- ← chapter 2 chapter 4 →
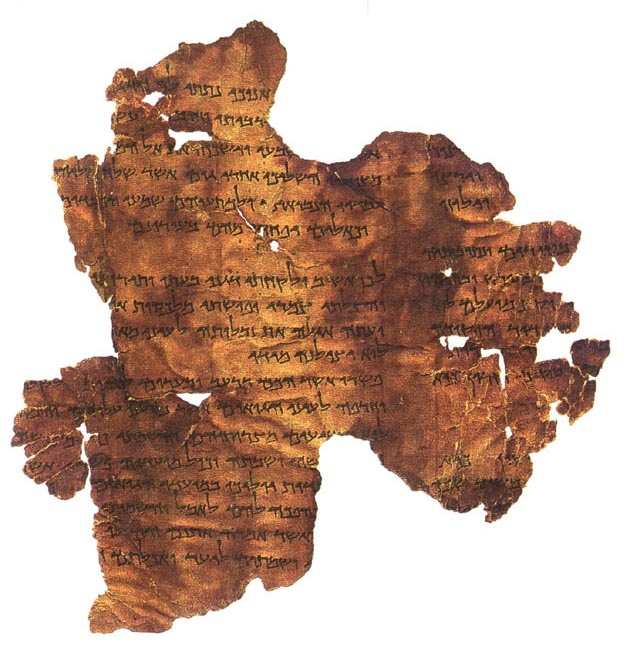
- 4Q166 "The Hosea Commentary Scroll", late first century B.C.
- Book: Book of Hosea
- Category: Nevi'im
- Christian Bible part: Old Testament
- Order in the Christian part: 28

Hosea 3 is the third, as well as shortest, (Note: This chapter is divided into 5 verses) chapter of the Book of Hosea in the Hebrew Bible or the Old Testament of the Christian Bible. The book, a member of the Twelve Minor Prophets, contains the prophecies attributed to the prophet Hosea, son of Beeri; chapter 3 refers autobiographically to Hosea's marriage to a woman who is an adulterer. His purchase of her from a paramour is treated in the Jamieson-Fausset-Brown Bible Commentary as a symbol of "Israel's condition in their present dispersion, subsequent to their return from Babylon".

== Text ==
The original text was written in Hebrew. Some early manuscripts containing the text of this chapter in Hebrew are of the Masoretic Text tradition, which includes the Codex Cairensis (895), the Petersburg Codex of the Prophets (916), Aleppo Codex (10th century), Codex Leningradensis (1008). Fragments containing parts of this chapter in Hebrew were found among the Dead Sea Scrolls, including 4Q78 (4QXII^{c}; 75–50 BCE) with extant verses 2–4; and 4Q82 (4QXII^{g}; 25 BCE) with extant verses 1–5.

There is also a translation into Koine Greek known as the Septuagint, made in the last few centuries BCE. Extant ancient manuscripts of the Septuagint version include Codex Vaticanus (B; $\mathfrak{G}$^{B}; 4th century), Codex Alexandrinus (A; $\mathfrak{G}$^{A}; 5th century) and Codex Marchalianus (Q; $\mathfrak{G}$^{Q}; 6th century). (Note: The Book of Hosea is missing from the extant Codex Sinaiticus.)

== Contents and commentary ==
=== Verse 1 ===
Then the Lord said to me,

"Go, again, love a woman who is loved by a lover and is committing adultery,
just as the Lord loves the children of Israel, who look to other gods and love raisin cakes."

- "A woman": presumed to be Gomer, who had left Hosea and was at that time living in adultery with another man, referred to as "a lover." Unlike in Hosea 1:2 ("take a wife"), here Hosea is told to "love" her; that is, to "renew his conjugal kindness to her."

The statement in the last part of this verse reflects the words of two verses in the book of Deuteronomy:

- Deuteronomy 7:8: "Because the Lord loved you" (see also Jeremiah 3:20).
- Deuteronomy 31:18: "They are turned to other gods."
- "Raisin cakes" (in the King James Version, "flagons of wine"): that is, "cakes of grapes" or "dried raisins"; these cakes were used in idolatry (Jeremiah 7:18; Jeremiah 44:19).

=== Verse 2 ===
So I bought her for fifteen shekels of silver and a homer and a lethech of barley

- "Bought": from the Hebrew root כָּרָה (karah; "to trade" or "get by trade"), the use here may be in the sense of "hiring" as rendered by the Septuagint and Arabic versions (see Acts 28:30 in the Christian Bible), as well as a term fitting for a harlot. The Latin Vulgate translates it as "I dug her," referring to the "digging" of a slave's ear who chose to stay with his master (Exodus 21:6).
- "Fifteen shekels of silver": half the price of a slave (Exodus 21:32) or may allude to the dowry for a bride (1 Samuel 18:25). A shekel was about 0.4 ounce or 11 grams.
- "A homer" of barley: was about 6 bushels or 220 liters or ten ephahs.
- "A lethech" of barley: was "half homer", about 3 bushels or 110 liters or five ephahs, so in total: "one and a half homer" would equal "fifteen ephahs".

=== Verse 3 ===
Then I said to her, “You will remain with me many days. You will not play the whore, and you will not belong to another man. And also I will be with you."

- "You will remain with me many days": literally, "you will sit", not going after others, as before, but waiting only for him (Exodus 24:14; Jeremiah 3:2), for an undefined, long period, until he comes and takes her to himself. Hosea stipulates that she should wait for this long period before she can be restored to her conjugal rights, and he, likewise, will wait for her. In Deuteronomy 21:13, the law for taking a beautiful captive woman stipulated that she was to mourn for her family for "a full month" before she could be married.

=== Verse 4 ===
For the children of Israel shall abide many days

without a king, and without a prince,
and without a sacrifice, and without an image,
and without an ephod, and without teraphim:

- "Ephod": generally refers to a linen garment worn by Israelite high priests according to Torah, and was equipped with Urim and Thummim; it was missing since the destruction of the second temple, so the people of Israel have been long without it and without the means of inquiry of God about future (cf. Ezra 2:63). Lacking the temple and the ephod, the whole Israelite priesthood now ceased in a proper sense, which the Septuagint renders with the phrase "without a priesthood".

=== Verse 5 ===
Afterward shall the children of Israel return,

and seek the Lord their God, and David their king;

and shall fear the Lord

and his goodness in the latter days.

- "David their King": This cannot refer to David himself because he was long dead, so it must be referring to "the Son of David," of whom God says, "I will set up One Shepherd over them, and He shall feed them, even My servant David, and He shall be their Shepherd, and I the Lord will be their God, and My servant David a Prince among them" (Ezekiel 34:23-24), who would be a "witness, leader, commander to the people (Isaiah 55:4); someone who was to be "raised up to David (Jeremiah 23:5-6), a righteous Branch", and who was to "be called the Lord our Righteousness; David's Lord" (Psalm 110:1), as well as "David's Son." The verse can be paraphrased as: "Afterward the children of Israel shall repent, or turn by repentance, and shall seek the service of the Lord their God, and shall obey Messiah the Son of David, their King".

== See also ==
- David
- Homer
- Israel
- Shekel
- Related Bible parts: Psalm 110, Jeremiah 23, Hosea 1, Hosea 2

== Sources ==
- Collins, John J. (2014). Introduction to the Hebrew Scriptures. Fortress Press. ISBN 9781451469233.
- Day, John (2007). "27. Hosea". In Barton, John; Muddiman, John (eds.). The Oxford Bible Commentary (first (paperback) ed.). Oxford University Press. pp. 571–578. ISBN 978-0199277186.
- Fitzmyer, Joseph A. (2008). A Guide to the Dead Sea Scrolls and Related Literature. Grand Rapids, MI: William B. Eerdmans Publishing Company. ISBN 9780802862419.
- Hayes, Christine (2015). Introduction to the Bible. Yale University Press. ISBN 978-0300188271.
- Ulrich, Eugene, ed. (2010). The Biblical Qumran Scrolls: Transcriptions and Textual Variants. Brill.
- Würthwein, Ernst (1995). The Text of the Old Testament. Translated by Rhodes, Erroll F. Grand Rapids, MI: Wm. B. Eerdmans. ISBN 0-8028-0788-7.
