= Hosea 9 =

- ← chapter 8 chapter 10 →
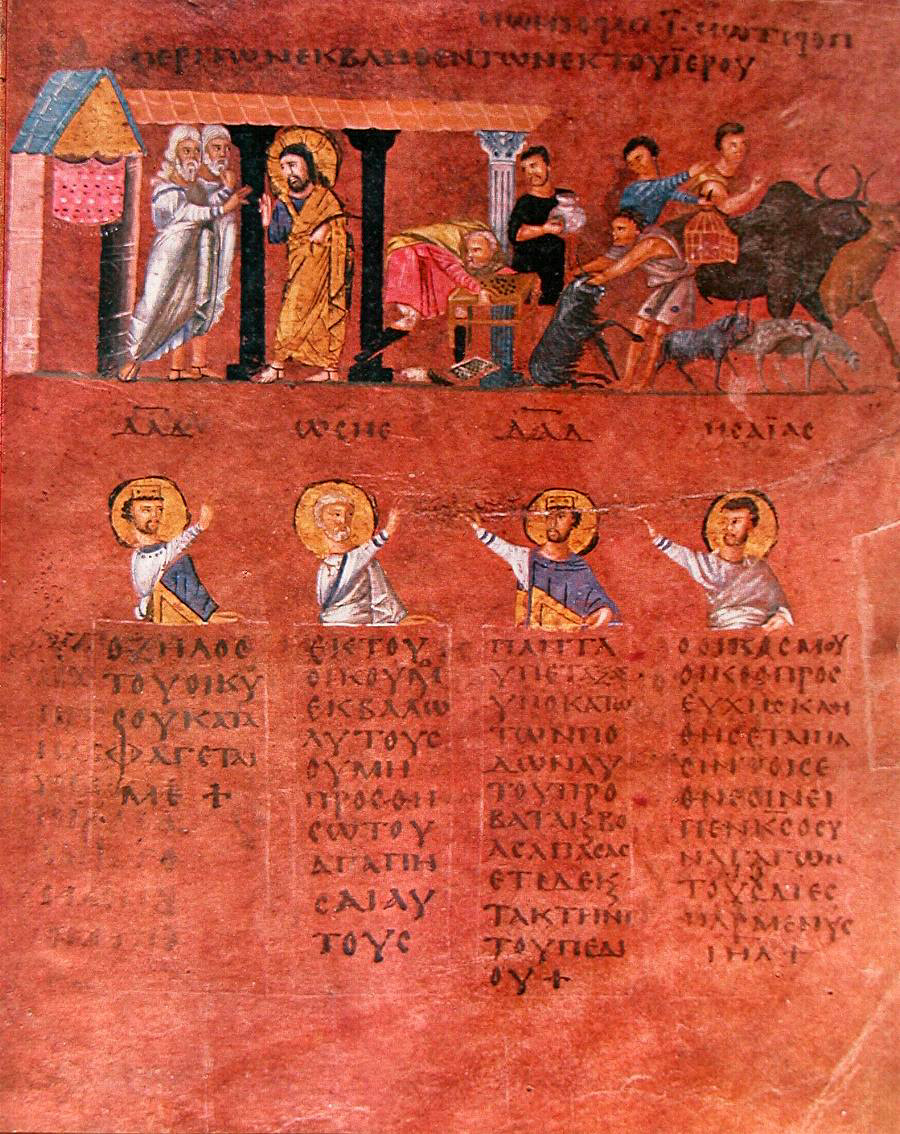
- The cleansing of the Temple, from the Rossano Gospels, 6th century. The verses cited below are Psalm 69:9, Hosea 9:15, Psalm 8:6–7, and Isaiah 56:7–8
- Book: Book of Hosea
- Category: Nevi'im
- Christian Bible part: Old Testament
- Order in the Christian part: 28

Hosea 9 is the ninth chapter of the Book of Hosea in the Hebrew Bible or the Old Testament of the Christian Bible. In the Hebrew Bible it is a part of the Book of the Twelve Minor Prophets. This chapter contain prophecies attributed to the prophet Hosea, son of Beeri, about the distress and captivity of Israel for her sins, especially for committing idolatry.

== Text ==
The original text was written in Hebrew language. Some early manuscripts containing the text of this chapter in Hebrew are of the Masoretic Text tradition, which includes the Codex Cairensis (895), the Petersburg Codex of the Prophets (916), Aleppo Codex (10th century), Codex Leningradensis (1008). Fragments containing parts of this chapter in Hebrew were found among the Dead Sea Scrolls, including 4Q82 (4QXII^{g}; 25 BCE) with extant verses 1–4, 9–17.

There is also a translation into Koine Greek known as the Septuagint, made in the last few centuries BCE. Extant ancient manuscripts of the Septuagint version include Codex Vaticanus (B; $\mathfrak{G}$^{B}; 4th century), Codex Alexandrinus (A; $\mathfrak{G}$^{A}; 5th century) and Codex Marchalianus (Q; $\mathfrak{G}$^{Q}; 6th century). (Note: The Book of Hosea is missing from the extant Codex Sinaiticus.)

This chapter is divided into 17 verses.

== Contents and commentary ==
Verses 1-9 and 14-17 are words attributed to Hosea forming "a prophetic diatribe" against religious practice in Ephraim (i.e. the Kingdom of Israel). In verses 10-13 God speaks directly.

=== Verse 1 ===
Do not rejoice, O Israel, with joy like other peoples,
For you have played the harlot against your God.
You have made love for hire on every threshing floor.

The "rejoicing ... like other peoples" refers to Israel's festal worship. The Good News Translation renders this text as People of Israel, stop celebrating your festivals like pagans.

=== Verse 9 ===
They have deeply corrupted themselves,

as in the days of Gibeah:

therefore he will remember their iniquity,

he will visit their sins.

The "days of Gibeah" refers to the "abominable acts" done to the concubine of a Levite (Judges 19), which almost brought the tribe of Benjamin into extinction, except six hundred men.

=== Verse 11 ===
As for Ephraim, their glory shall fly away like a bird,

from the birth, and from the womb, and from the conception.

- "Fly away like a bird": The "double fruitfulness" of Ephraim because of the fertile land and the multiplication of their population; was to vanish quickly and entirely, like birds swiftly fly out of sight. The calamity is further expressed in anti-climactic way - no child-bearing, no pregnancy, no conception (cf. Deuteronomy 32:25.

== See also ==
- Assyria
- Baal-Peor
- Egypt
- Ephraim
- Gibeah
- Gilgal
- Israel
- Memphis
- Samaria
- Tyre
- Related Bible parts: Numbers 25, Judges 19, Hosea 6, Hosea 7, Hosea 8

== Sources ==
- Collins, John J. (2014). Introduction to the Hebrew Scriptures. Fortress Press. ISBN 9781451469233.
- Day, John (2007). "27. Hosea". In Barton, John; Muddiman, John (eds.). The Oxford Bible Commentary (first (paperback) ed.). Oxford University Press. pp. 571–578. ISBN 978-0199277186.
- Fitzmyer, Joseph A. (2008). A Guide to the Dead Sea Scrolls and Related Literature. Grand Rapids, MI: William B. Eerdmans Publishing Company. ISBN 9780802862419.
- Hayes, Christine (2015). Introduction to the Bible. Yale University Press. ISBN 978-0300188271.
- Ulrich, Eugene, ed. (2010). The Biblical Qumran Scrolls: Transcriptions and Textual Variants. Brill.
- Würthwein, Ernst (1995). The Text of the Old Testament. Translated by Rhodes, Erroll F. Grand Rapids, MI: Wm. B. Eerdmans. ISBN 0-8028-0788-7.
