= Gilgal =

Biblical place

Coordinates: 32.0330°N 35.4757°E

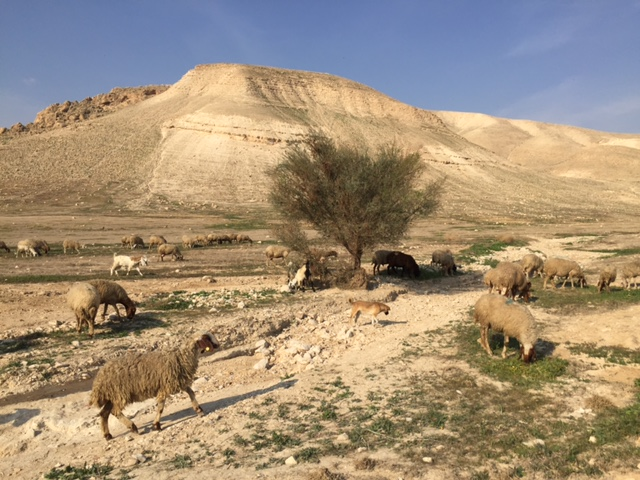
Gilgal near the Israeli town of Yafit

Gilgal (Hebrew: גִּלְגָּל Gilgāl), also known as Galgala or Galgalatokai of the 12 Stones (Ancient Greek: Γαλαγα or Γαλγαλατοκαι Δωδεκαλίθων, Dōdekalithōn), is the name of one or more places in the Hebrew Bible. Gilgal is mentioned 39 times, in particular in the Book of Joshua, as the place where the Israelites camped after crossing the Jordan River (Joshua 4:19 – 5:12).

The Hebrew term Gilgal most likely means "circle of stones". Its name appears in Koine Greek on the Madaba Map.

== Places named Gilgal in the Bible ==
=== In Joshua 4–5 ===
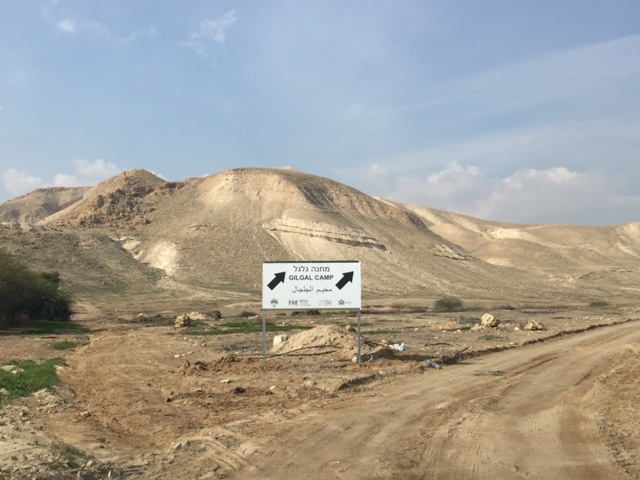
Proposed location of Biblical Gilgal in the Israel

According to Joshua 4:19, Gilgal is a location "on the eastern border of Jericho" where the Israelites encamped immediately after crossing the Jordan River. There, they erected twelve stones as a memorial to the miraculous stopping of the river when they crossed. Joshua then ordered the Israelites who had been born during the Exodus to be circumcised at this spot. The Bible refers to this place as Givat Ha'aralot, then says that Joshua called the place Gilgal because, in his words, "today I have removed (galoti) the shame of Egypt from upon you."

Some scholars speculate that the circle of 12 stones was the (unnamed) religious sanctuary that was condemned in Amos 4:4 and 5:5 and Hosea 4:15. In Amos 5:5 the condemnation turns on a wordplay that translation cannot reproduce: “for Gilgal shall surely go into exile,” where the name Gilgal (hag-Gilgal) and the verb for going into exile (galoh yigleh) share the same consonants, so the place name itself pronounces its sentence.

=== Elsewhere in Joshua ===
"The king of Goyim, of Gilgal" is listed as one of the 31 kings defeated by Joshua. His city is identified by Eusebius with Jaljulia.

"In fact, the King of Goim was defeated in Gilgal of Jericho, that is, the name of his city was not Gilgal (Joshua 12:23)

"Gilgal" is mentioned as a location on the border between the tribes of Judah and Benjamin, near Ma'ale Adumim.

=== In Deuteronomy ===
In the Book of Deuteronomy 11:29–30, Gilgal is a place across from Mount Gerizim and Mount Ebal.

=== In the Book of Samuel ===
A place named Gilgal was included in Samuel's annual circuit, and is the location where he offered sacrifices after Saul was anointed as king, and where he renewed Saul's kingship together with the people.

In 1 Samuel 15, Gilgal is where Samuel hewed King Agag in pieces after Saul refused to obey God and utterly destroy the Amalekites.

On King David's return to Jerusalem after the death of his son Absalom (2 Samuel 19), David traveled to Gilgal. From there he was escorted to Jerusalem by the tribes of Judah and Benjamin.

Again it is possible for this to be yet another "circle of standing stones" (or the same one as mentioned in relation to Elijah and Elisha, as Bethel is on the circuit with Gilgal, and other assumed locations show Gilgal to be far further away than the other two locations), and it is significant that it is treated as a holy place by the biblical text, rather than as a heathen one.

=== In the Book of Kings ===
In the Books of Kings, "Gilgal" is mentioned as the home of a company of prophets. The text states that Elijah and Elisha came from Gilgal to Bethel, and then onward to Jericho and to the Jordan, suggesting that the place was in the vicinity of Bethel, and far from Joshua's Gilgal near Jericho.

Since "Gilgal" means a "circle of standing stones", it is quite plausible for there to have been more than one place named Gilgal, and although there are dissenting opinions, it is commonly held to be a different place from the one involved with Joshua; it has been identified with the village Jaljulia, about 11 kilometres (6.8 mi) north of Bethel. It is significant that the Books of Kings treat it as a place of holiness, suggesting that stone circles still had a positive religious value at the time the source text of the passages in question was written, rather than having been condemned as heathen by religious reforms. Another opinion is that it is not different from the Book of Joshua, as it locates it near Bethel as does the Books of Chronicles.

=== In Hosea ===
Gilgal is mentioned in God's rebuke of the Israelites saying: "The Lord says, 'All their wickedness began at Gilgal; there I began to hate them. I will drive them from my land because of their evil actions. I will love them no more because all their leaders are rebels.'"(Hosea 9, Hosea 9:15).

Hosea also mentions sacrifices in Gilgal: "If Gilead be given to iniquity becoming altogether vanity, in Gilgal they sacrifice unto bullocks; yea, their altars shall be as heaps in the furrows of the field." (Hosea 12, Hosea 12:11).

== Gilgal as a geographic term ==
Gilgalim. Red: archaeological discovery. Blue: Biblical mention, not discovered, location uncertain. Purple: discovered and identified with Biblical site

The term gilgal is thought by many modern archaeologists to refer to a type of structure, which may then receive additional names, for example "the gilgal by the terebinths of Moreh" (Deuteronomy 11:30) or "the gilgal on the eastern border of Jericho" (Joshua 4:19). Gilgal structures have been found only in the Jordan River valley, and in the Samarian mountains on the edge of the desert. Pottery discoveries date them to the early Israelite period, with most remains from the 12th–11th centuries BCE. They are located on the lower slopes of a hill, have a footprint-shaped stone outline, and were used for occasional assembly rather than permanent dwelling. These sites are hypothesized to be ritual sites where the early Israelites celebrated holidays together, until worship was centralized. The footprint-shaped outline recalls ancient Egyptian symbolism in which a footprint symbolized ownership. The use of low slopes is in contrast to Canaanite practice, which placed sanctuaries "on every lofty hill" (2 Kings 17:10).

This theory is disputed by Nadav Na'aman, who argues that "gilgal" as a type of settlement never appears in the Bible, and that all references to a place of that name are either corruptions (for example of "Galilee") or refer to a single unidentified cultic site east of Jericho.

=== Gilgal/Golgol in the Hula Valley ===
A Late Roman boundary stone discovered at Abil al-Qamḥ (biblical Abel Beth Maacah) mentions the place-name Golgol (Γολγολ), derived from the Semitic root GLGL/Gilgal. While earlier researchersidentified this site with Tell el-Ajjul, recent lanalysis has proposed a revised location at al-Zūq al-Fauqānī, based on the Arabic micro-toponym Juneijil (جنيجل). This interpretation highlights how ancient toponymy has survived in Palestinian Arabic through phonological shifts over time.

== Location ==
Edward Robinson first drew the connection to Gilgal to Jiljilyya in 1838, as did van de Velde and Victor Guérin in 1870. In 1882, SWP noted: "The name suggests its identity with Gilgal, a town in the mountains near Bethel. This Gilgal (2 Kings ii. i) is mentioned as though above Bethel (verse 2), which does not agree exactly with the position of Jiljilia (2,441 feet above the sea), and of Beitin (2,890), but the descent into the great valley, Wady el Jib, may account for the expression, 'went down to Bethel'."

In the 20th century, archaeologist W.F. Albright disagreed with this identification, while Abel agreed with it.

=== Khirbet en-Nitle ===
According to Yoel Elitzur (2019), "the main Gilgal in the Bible" is located between Jericho and the Jordan river, and corresponds to the settlement of Khirbet en-Nitle. This Gilgal is mentioned 11 times in the book of Joshua, and most of the narratives in the Early Prophets happening in 'Gilgal' correspond to this location. In particular, 2 Sam 19:16 refers to this Gilgal while describing the events in the life of David, who passed near this location while returning after the death of Absalom from Mahanaim to Jerusalem.

Nadav Na'aman also refers to the same area near Jericho, and argues that the original Gilgal was located there, although he is not certain about the exact location of the site.

The excavations at the site were conducted in 1950 by an American expedition led by Prof. J. L. Kelso.

== See also ==
- Ancient underground quarry, Jordan Valley, possibly associated by the Byzantines with Gilgal and the "twelve stones"
- Yom HaAliyah, Israeli national holiday created to honor the Jewish people carrying the Ark of the Covenant crossing the Jordan River into the Land of Israel at Gilgal as recorded in the Book of Joshua in the Bible.
- Gilgal I, Neolithic site in the Jordan Valley, West Bank
- Gilgal (Israeli settlement), Israeli settlement in the Jordan Valley, West Bank

== Bibliography ==
- Albright, W.F. (1922). "Excavations and Results at Tell el-Fûl (Gibeah of Saul)". The Annual of the American Schools of Oriental Research. 4: iii+ix+xi+xiii+1–160. doi:10.2307/3768487. JSTOR 3768487.
- Conder, C.R.; Kitchener, H.H. (1882). The Survey of Western Palestine: Memoirs of the Topography, Orography, Hydrography, and Archaeology. Vol. 2. London: Committee of the Palestine Exploration Fund.
- Finkelstein, I.; Lederman, Zvi, eds. (1997). Highlands of many cultures. Tel Aviv: Institute of Archaeology of Tel Aviv University Publications Section. ISBN 978-965-440-007-7.
- Guérin, V. (1875). Description Géographique Historique et Archéologique de la Palestine (in French). Vol. 2: Samarie, pt. 2. Paris: L'Imprimerie Nationale.
- Kelso, J. L., Baramki, D. C. (1955), Excavations at New Testament Jericho and Khirbet en-Nitla. New Haven, CT: AASOR.
- Robinson, E.; Smith, E. (1841). Biblical Researches in Palestine, Mount Sinai and Arabia Petraea: A Journal of Travels in the year 1838. Vol. 3. Boston: Crocker & Brewster.
- Velde, van de, C.W.M. (1858). Memoir to Accompany the Map of the Holy Land. Gotha: Justus Perthes.
