= Adoration =

Respect, reverence, strong admiration or devotion in a certain person, place, or thing

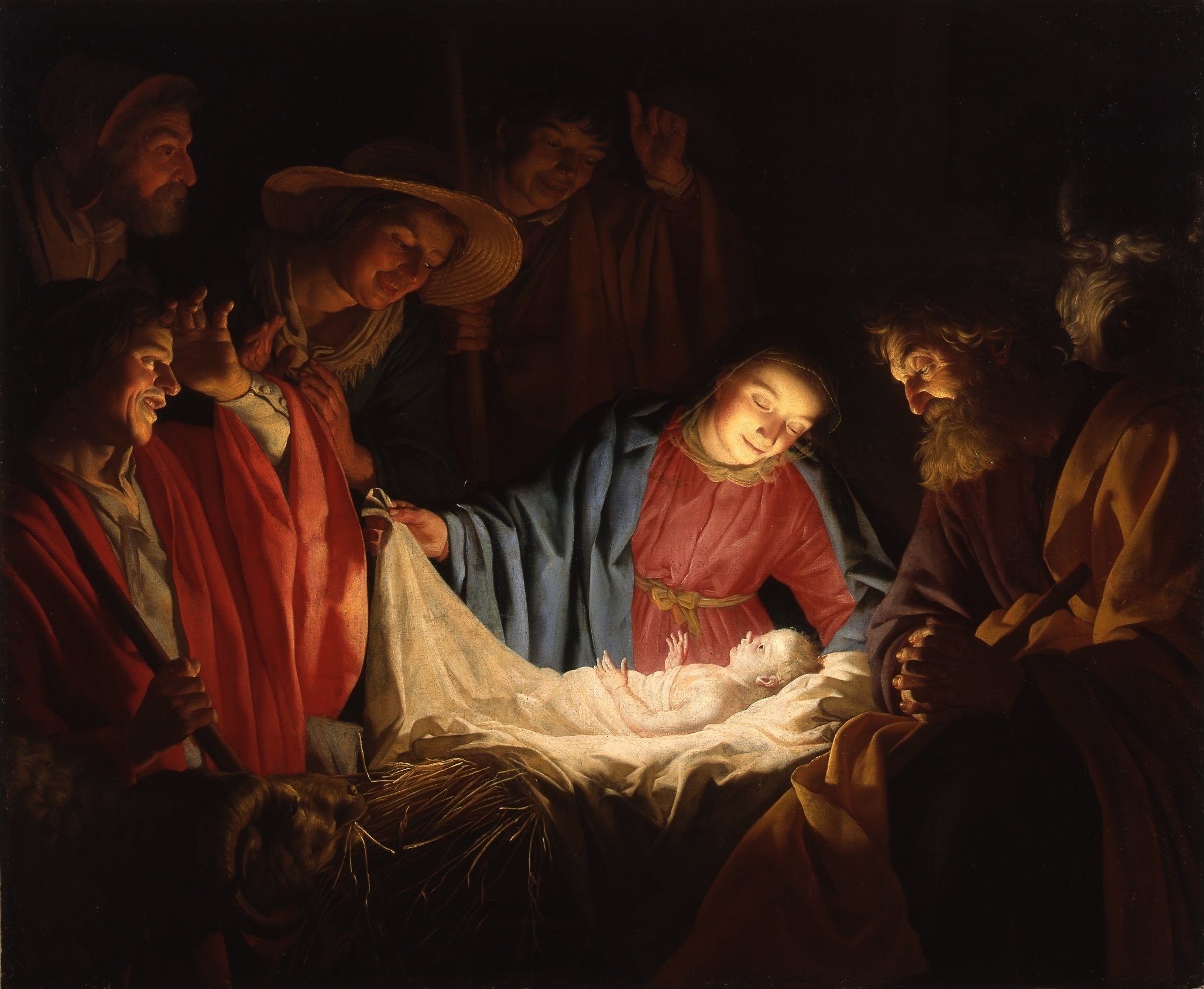
Adoration of the Shepherds (c. 1622)

Adoration is respect, reverence, strong admiration, and love for a certain person, place, or thing. The term comes from the Latin adōrātiō, meaning "to give homage or worship to someone or something".

== Ancient Rome ==
In classical Rome, adoration was primarily an act of homage or worship. Among the Romans, it was performed by raising the hand to the mouth, kissing it and then waving it in the direction of the adored object. This act was called Adoratio and was performed during rites. The devotee had their head covered and, after the act, turned themselves round from left to right. Sometimes they kissed the feet or knees of the images of the gods themselves; Saturn and Hercules were adored with the head bare.

By a natural transition, the homage, at first paid to divine beings alone, came to be paid to monarchs. Thus the Greek and Roman emperors were adored by bowing or kneeling, laying hold of the imperial robe, and presently withdrawing the hand and pressing it to the lips, or by putting the royal robe itself to the lips.

== Ancient Middle East ==
In Eastern countries, adoration has been performed in an attitude still more lowly. The Persian method, introduced by Cyrus the Great, was to kiss the knee and fall on the face at the prince's feet, striking the earth with the forehead and kissing the ground. This striking of the earth with the forehead, usually a fixed number of times, was a form of adoration sometimes paid to Eastern potentates.

The Jews kissed in homage, as did other groups mentioned in the Old Testament: thus in 1 Kings 19:18, God is made to say, "Yet I have left me seven thousand in Israel, all the knees which have not bowed unto Baal, and every mouth which hath not kissed him", and in Psalm 2:12, "Kiss the Son, lest he be angry, and ye perish from the way". (See also Hosea 13:2.)

== Christianity ==
The Christian faith has historically taught that believers are to "adore one and the same Christ, the Son of God and of man, consisting of and in two inseparable and undivided natures".

Such adoration may be a simple visit to the Blessed Sacrament, a brief encounter with Christ inspired by faith in the real presence and characterized by silent prayer or it may take the form of Eucharistic adoration, in which the Blessed Sacrament is adored by the faithful. In this adoration hours, the sacrament is exposed in a monstrance on the altar. Larger churches often have adoration chapels in which the Eucharist is exposed for temporarily or continuous adoration. A special form of this adoration and widely spread in popular piety is the adoration of the Blessed Sacrament which follows the celebration of the Mass of the Lord's Supper on the evening of Holy Thursday, which sometimes takes the whole night. During the Triduum Sacrum, Good Friday is especially suited for the adoration of the Cross.

== Other forms ==
In England, acts like kissing the sovereign's hand, and some others which are performed while kneeling, may be described as forms of adoration.

== See also ==
- Kowtow
- Proskynesis
- Prostration
