= Reap the whirlwind =

Reap the whirlwind may refer to:

== Literature ==
- Hosea 8:7: "For they have sown the wind, and they shall reap the whirlwind."
- Reap the Whirlwind (Star Trek novel), a 2007 Star Trek: Vanguard novel by David Mack
- Reap the Whirlwind, a 1989 The Sword of Knowledge novel by C. J. Cherryh and Mercedes Lackey
- Reap the Whirlwind, a 1968 memoir by Geoffrey Bing
- Reap the Whirlwind, a 1994 Plainsmen Series novel by Terry C. Johnston
- Reap the Whirlwind: The Untold Story of 6 Group, Canada's Bomber Force of World War II, a 1992 history by Spencer Dunmore

== Other media ==
- "Reap the Whirlwind" (Traders), an episode of Traders
- Reap the Whirlwind (adventure), a 1987 supplement for the RPG Marvel Super Heroes
- Reap the Whirlwind, a 2013 publication for the roleplaying game Vampire: The Requiem.
- "You called down the thunder, now reap the whirlwind", a voice line from the Terran Ghost unit from StarCraft: Brood War by Blizzard Entertainment
- Reap the Whirlwind (Arthur Harris), Part of a speech by Sir Arthur Harris in June 1942 where he explained his bombing campaign against Nazi Germany.
- The Rani Reaps the Whirlwind, a 2000 Doctor Who audio drama from BBV Productions

== See also ==
- Reaping the Whirlwind (disambiguation)
