= Reaping the Whirlwind =

Reaping the Whirlwind may refer to:

- "Reaping the Whirlwind", a song by Buckethead from Funnel Weaver
- Reaping the Whirlwind, a 1908 play by Allan Monkhouse
- Reaping the Whirlwind: A Christian Interpretation of History, a 1976 book by Langdon Brown Gilkey

== See also ==
- Reap the whirlwind (disambiguation)
