= Birgitta Hosea =

Scottish animation artist (born 1966)

- Born: 1966 (age 59–60); Edinburgh
- Education: Glasgow School of Art
- Known for: Animation, Performance Art

Birgitta Hosea (born 1966) is a British animation artist of Scottish and Swedish descent who works with expanded animation and experimental drawing. She explores diverse themes such as identity, spirituality and traces of existence. Her work combines a range of media such as shadow puppets, drawing, manipulated video, paper sculpture, animation, holographic projection, live video feeds and interactive technology – with live performance and installation.

== Exhibitions ==
- Recent works include 'Holes' (2021) at ASIFAKEIL, Austria, Krupa Art Foundation, Poland
- 'Erasure' (2018) at Hanmi Gallery, Seoul
- ʻSKYPE vs Night Skyʼ for the Papay Nights festival, Orkney (2011)
- ʻChatterʼ at the Cinematic Arts Gallery, Los Angeles (2010)
- ʻWhite Linesʼ at Kinetica Art Fair and Shunt, London (2010)
- ʻOut There in the Darkʼ at the British Film Institute, London and Mix 23 Queer Experimental Film Festival, New York (2010)

== Publications ==
Her academic publications draw from an interest in material, sensory, physical and social approaches to drawing and animation. She is co-author of Performance Drawing: New Practices Since 1945 (Bloomsbury, 2022) with Maryclare Foá, Jane Grisewood and Carali McCall and co-editor of 'Decolonising Animation' with Helen Starr.
