= John A. O'Brien =

Catholic author and pamphleteer

Reverend or Father John A. O'Brien (1893–1980), whose full name was John Anthony O'Brien, was an influential progressive American Catholic scholar, pamphleteer and writer.

== Early life ==
O'Brien was born on 20 January 1893 in Peoria, Illinois. He was ordained as a priest of the Diocese of Peoria by Bishop Edmund M. Dunne. He served as chaplain for the Catholic students at the University of Illinois and earned a Ph.D. in psychology there. He started the Newman Foundation at the University of Illinois.

== Career ==
In total, O'Brien published over forty books. Among them were The White Harvest (1927) and Catholics and Scholarship (1938), influential collections of essays by participants at symposia he organized. In 1938 he published a book about Catholicism directed at non-Catholics called The Faith of Millions, which became a best-seller. Also among his most popular publications were the five books in a series called The Road to Damascus, published between 1949 and 1956, in which seventy-eight prominent converts to Catholicism gave accounts of what had led them to the Church. The contributors included Evelyn Waugh, Clare Booth Luce, Avery Dulles, Dorothy Day, Raïssa Maritain, Thomas Merton, Ronald Knox and Leonard Cheshire. O'Brien remained at the University of Illinois for twenty-two years. In 1939, he spent a year at Oxford University and published Thunder from the Left, a critique of communism. For the rest of his life he taught at the University of Notre Dame and wrote. His work often focused on the compatibility of science and Catholicism. He published two books on evolution, Evolution and Religion (1932) and God and Evolution (1961).

== Birth control ==
An interest in birth control arose among Catholics in America as a result of the challenge to the family economy posed by the Great Depression in the 1930s and the approval of artificial contraception by Jewish and Anglican authorities. O'Brien made an attempt that was progressive at the time to move the issue of birth control away from religion and into the realm of science. In his book Natural Birth Control (1938), he presented the "rhythm method" as the ideal non-artificial birth control for Catholics. O'Brien's psychological approach was influenced by the thought of the German Catholic ethicist Dietrich von Hildebrand, who argued in his 1928 book In Defence of Purity that, besides its procreative aspect, marital sexuality plays a vital role in enhancing the unique interpersonal union that gives marriage its greater meaning. O'Brien's views, however, clashed with those of conservatives in the Catholic Church, who promoted total abstinence as exemplified by the encyclical Casti connubii (1930), which restated the objection to artificial conception.

== Awards and Death ==
In 1973, the University of Notre Dame awarded him the Laetare Medal, a degree Notre Dame bestows on American Catholics for outstanding service to the Catholic Church and society. He died on 18 April 1980 in South Bend, Indiana, after a long illness.
