= Hosea 8 =

Chapter 8 of the Book of Hosea

- ← chapter 7 chapter 9 →
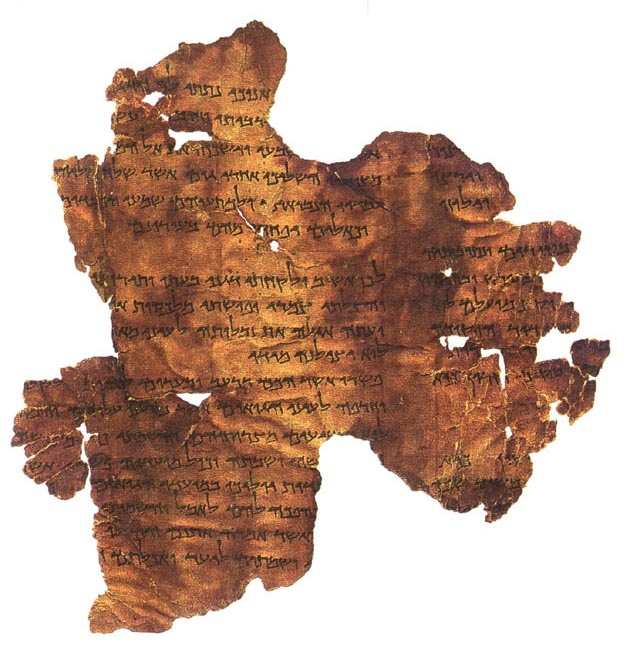
- 4Q166 "The Hosea Commentary Scroll", late first century B.C.
- Book: Book of Hosea
- Category: Nevi'im
- Christian Bible part: Old Testament
- Order in the Christian part: 28

Hosea 8 is the eighth chapter of the Book of Hosea in the Hebrew Bible or the Old Testament of the Christian Bible. In the Hebrew Bible it is a part of the Book of the Twelve Minor Prophets. This chapter contains prophecies attributed to the prophet Hosea, son of Beeri, about the impending destruction of Israel and Judah (Note: Judah is mentioned just once, in verse 14) for their impiety and idolatry.

== Text ==
The original text was written in Hebrew. Some early manuscripts containing the text of this chapter in Hebrew are of the Masoretic Text tradition, which includes the Codex Cairensis (895), the Petersburg Codex of the Prophets (916), Aleppo Codex (10th century), Codex Leningradensis (1008). Fragments containing parts of this chapter in Hebrew were found among the Dead Sea Scrolls, including 4Q82 (4QXII^{g}; 25 BCE) with extant verse 1.

There is also a translation into Koine Greek known as the Septuagint, made in the last few centuries BCE. Extant ancient manuscripts of the Septuagint version include Codex Vaticanus (B; $\mathfrak{G}$^{B}; 4th century), Codex Alexandrinus (A; $\mathfrak{G}$^{A}; 5th century) and Codex Marchalianus (Q; $\mathfrak{G}$^{Q}; 6th century). (Note: Book of Hosea is missing from the extant Codex Sinaiticus.)

This chapter is divided into 14 verses.

== Contents and commentary ==
=== Verse 1 ===
Put the trumpet to your lips!

One like an eagle is over the house of the Lord!

Because they have violated my covenant,

and rebelled against my law.

The editors of the New American Bible Revised Edition suggest that the eagle mentioned in this verse may refer to Tiglath-Pileser III of Assyria, who overran the land of Israel in 733 B.C. Thomas Kelly Cheyne reads "great emotion" in the short clauses of this verse.

=== Verse 7 ===
For they have sown the wind, and they shall reap the whirlwind:
it hath no stalk; the bud shall yield no meal: if so be it yield, the strangers shall swallow it up.

"For they have sown the wind, and they shall reap the whirlwind" is considered a proverb which states that works have rewards and actions have consequences, especially that people may face negative consequences for their bad actions. Several works of fiction have the title "Reap the Whirlwind".

=== Verse 9 ===
For they have gone up to Assyria,

like a wild donkey alone by itself;

Ephraim has hired lovers.

- "Gone up": reflecting Israel's sunken state, and Assyria's superiority, because normally the foreigners were said to "go up" when they came to the land of Israel.
- "To Assyria" may refer to the request of Menahem for help from Pul, the king of Assyria, to put him on the throne (cf. Hosea 5:13; 7:11). Menahem's name is found as a tributary to the Assyrian king in his 'eighth year' in inscriptions discovered in the southwest palace of Nimrod. The dynasty of Pul ('Phalluka') was supplanted by that of Tiglath-Pileser III at Nineveh about 768 (or 760) BCE.
- "Wild ass": of the East or "pere", is "heady, unruly, un-disciplinable" (cf. Job 11:12; Abraham was told that Ishmael would be one in Genesis 16:12), "obstinate, running with swiftness far outstripping the swiftest horse", without rule or direction. However, the one breaking away alone would expose itself for as prey to lions (cf. "the wild donkey is the lion's prey in the wilderness"; Ecclesiasticus 13:19). Israel had become "stubborn, heady, self-willed, refusing to be ruled by God's law and His counsel", but instead running to the Assyrian, then would perish there. This is a figure of Israel's headstrong perversity in following her bent (Jeremiah 2:24).
- "Hired lovers": or "sued for lovers", in contrast of being independent by going alone, Ephraim lost independence by soliciting help from foreign allies.

=== Verse 11 ===
Because Ephraim hath made many altars to sin,

altars shall be unto him to sin.

- "Many altars to sin": The altars were built not with an intention to commit sin, but to offer sacrifice for sin (make atonement for it). However, they are directed to idols, not the God of Israel, so the people sinned in making these and also caused sin for other people who followed their example. This refers to the action of King Jeroboam of Israel, who erected altars in Dan and Bethel, and caused the people to build the altars in all high places, and tops of mountains, where they sacrificed to idols, against the commandment of God, who required sacrifice only at one place, and on one altar (Deuteronomy 12:5).

== See also ==
- Related Bible parts: Hosea 6, Hosea 7

== Sources ==
- Collins, John J. (2014). Introduction to the Hebrew Scriptures. Fortress Press. ISBN 9781451469233.
- Day, John (2007). "27. Hosea". In Barton, John; Muddiman, John (eds.). The Oxford Bible Commentary (first (paperback) ed.). Oxford University Press. pp. 571–578. ISBN 978-0199277186.
- Fitzmyer, Joseph A. (2008). A Guide to the Dead Sea Scrolls and Related Literature. Grand Rapids, MI: William B. Eerdmans Publishing Company. ISBN 9780802862419.
- Hayes, Christine (2015). Introduction to the Bible. Yale University Press. ISBN 978-0300188271.
- Ulrich, Eugene, ed. (2010). The Biblical Qumran Scrolls: Transcriptions and Textual Variants. Brill.
- Würthwein, Ernst (1995). The Text of the Old Testament. Translated by Rhodes, Erroll F. Grand Rapids, MI: Wm. B. Eerdmans. ISBN 0-8028-0788-7.
