= Hosea 7 =

- ← chapter 6 chapter 8 →
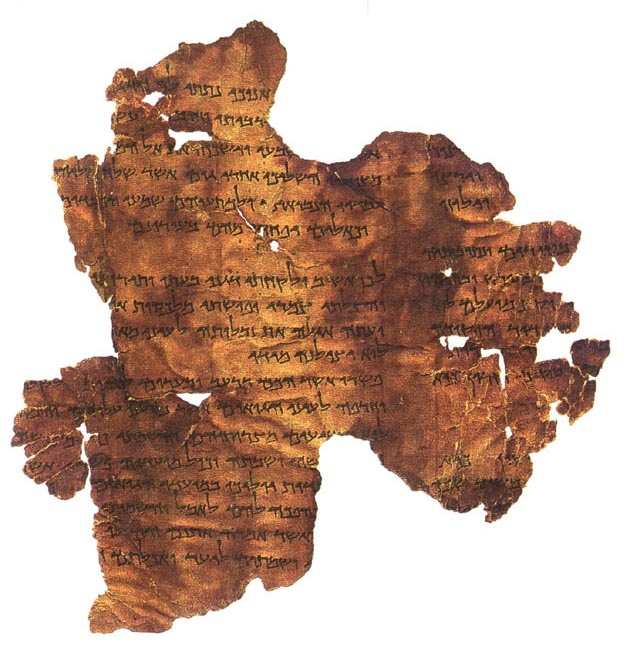
- 4Q166 "The Hosea Commentary Scroll", late first century B.C.
- Book: Book of Hosea
- Category: Nevi'im
- Christian Bible part: Old Testament
- Order in the Christian part: 28

Hosea 7 is the seventh chapter of the Book of Hosea in the Hebrew Bible or the Old Testament of the Christian Bible. In the Hebrew Bible it is a part of the Book of the Twelve Minor Prophets. The book contains the prophecies attributed the prophet Hosea, son of Beeri, and this chapter is about Israel reproved for multiple sins (Hosea 7:1-10) resulting in God's wrath against them for their hypocrisy (Hosea 7:11-16).

== Text ==
The original text was written in Hebrew. Some early manuscripts containing the text of this chapter in Hebrew are of the Masoretic Text tradition, which includes the Codex Cairensis (895), the Petersburg Codex of the Prophets (916), Aleppo Codex (10th century), Codex Leningradensis (1008). Fragments containing parts of this chapter in Hebrew were found among the Dead Sea Scrolls, including 4Q78 (4QXII^{c}; 75–50 BCE) with extant verses 12–13; and 4Q82 (4QXII^{g}; 25 BCE) with extant verses 1, 12–16.

There is also a translation into Koine Greek known as the Septuagint, made in the last few centuries BCE. Extant ancient manuscripts of the Septuagint version include Codex Vaticanus (B; $\mathfrak{G}$^{B}; 4th century), Codex Alexandrinus (A; $\mathfrak{G}$^{A}; 5th century) and Codex Marchalianus (Q; $\mathfrak{G}$^{Q}; 6th century). (Note: The Book of Hosea is missing from the extant Codex Sinaiticus.'"`UNIQ--ref-00000009-QINU`"')

This chapter is divided into 16 verses.

== Contents and commentary ==
=== Verse 1 ===
When I would have healed Israel,
Then the iniquity of Ephraim was uncovered,
And the wickedness of Samaria.
For they have committed fraud;
A thief comes in;
A band of robbers takes spoil outside.

Hosea mentions Samaria here for the first time, the capital of the northern kingdom: he will refer to it again on several further occasions. Albert Barnes suggests that "the name "Israel" includes the whole people; the names, Ephraim and Samaria, probably are meant to designate the chief among them, Ephraim having been their royal tribe, and being the chief tribe among them; Samaria being their royal city.

=== Verse 11 ===
Ephraim also is like a silly dove without heart:

they call to Egypt,
they go to Assyria.

- "A silly dove": a proverbial bird for 'simplicity', for being easily deceived, easily be led to evil ("like wax to be bent to evil"; Psalm 116:6), as in an Eastern proverb: "There is nothing more simple than a dove". Jerome wrote that this bird does not search nor grieve for its chicks when they are missing. Thus Proverbs 1:22 has "How long, you simple one, will you love simplicity?", whereas Jesus Christ uses the likeness of the dove in "be wise as serpents, harmless ('simple'; 'innocent') as doves" (Matthew 10:16).
- "Call to Egypt": for help, as when Hoshea king of Israel asked help from So (or Sabacon), king of Egypt (2 Kings 17:4).
- "Go to Assyria": paying tributes like Menahem to Pul, or Hoshea to Shalmaneser (2 Kings 15:19). The Targum interprets it not as to "go asking for help" but states that "they go captive ('are carried captive') into Assyria."

== See also ==
- Assyria
- Egypt
- Ephraim
- Israel
- Judah
- Samaria
- Related Bible parts: Hosea 6, Hosea 8

== Sources ==
- Collins, John J. (2014). Introduction to the Hebrew Scriptures. Fortress Press. ISBN 9781451469233.
- Day, John (2007). "27. Hosea". In Barton, John; Muddiman, John (eds.). The Oxford Bible Commentary (first (paperback) ed.). Oxford University Press. pp. 571–578. ISBN 978-0199277186.
- Fitzmyer, Joseph A. (2008). A Guide to the Dead Sea Scrolls and Related Literature. Grand Rapids, MI: William B. Eerdmans Publishing Company. ISBN 9780802862419.
- Hayes, Christine (2015). Introduction to the Bible. Yale University Press. ISBN 978-0300188271.
- Ulrich, Eugene, ed. (2010). The Biblical Qumran Scrolls: Transcriptions and Textual Variants. Brill.
- Würthwein, Ernst (1995). The Text of the Old Testament. Translated by Rhodes, Erroll F. Grand Rapids, MI: Wm. B. Eerdmans. ISBN 0-8028-0788-7.
