= Hosea 6 =

- ← chapter 5 chapter 7 →
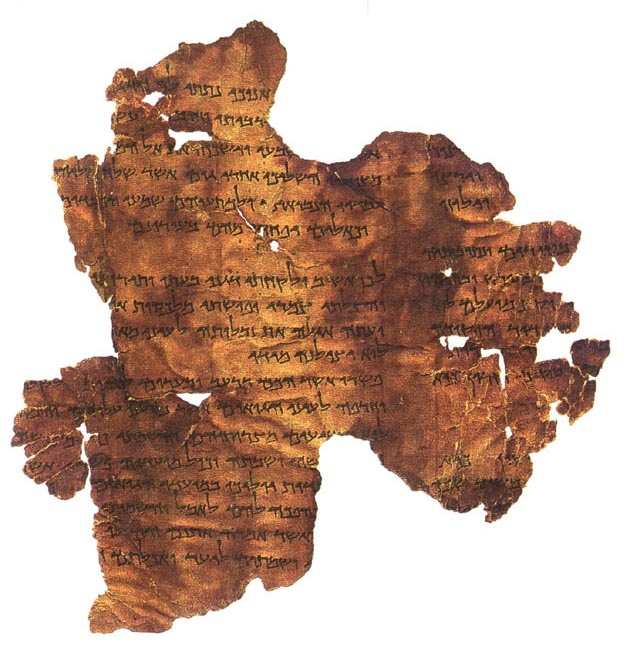
- 4Q166 "The Hosea Commentary Scroll", late first century B.C.
- Book: Book of Hosea
- Category: Nevi'im
- Christian Bible part: Old Testament
- Order in the Christian part: 28

Hosea 6 is the sixth chapter of the Book of Hosea in the Hebrew Bible or the Old Testament of the Christian Bible. In the Hebrew Bible it is a part of the Book of the Twelve Minor Prophets. This chapter contains prophecies attributed to the prophet Hosea, son of Beeri, including an exhortation to repentance (Hosea 6:1-3) and a complaint against Israel and Judah for persisting still in their wickedness (Hosea 6:4-11).

== Text ==
The original text was written in Hebrew. Some early manuscripts containing the text of this chapter in Hebrew are of the Masoretic Text tradition, which includes the Codex Cairensis (895), the Petersburg Codex of the Prophets (916), Aleppo Codex (10th century), Codex Leningradensis (1008). Fragments containing parts of this chapter in Hebrew were found among the Dead Sea Scrolls, including 4Q82 (4QXII^{g}; 25 BCE) with extant verse 3–4, 8–11.

There is also a translation into Koine Greek known as the Septuagint, made in the last few centuries BCE. Extant ancient manuscripts of the Septuagint version include Codex Vaticanus (B; $\mathfrak{G}$^{B}; 4th century), Codex Alexandrinus (A; $\mathfrak{G}$^{A}; 5th century) and Codex Marchalianus (Q; $\mathfrak{G}$^{Q}; 6th century). (Note: The Book of Hosea is missing from the extant Codex Sinaiticus.)

This chapter is divided into 11 verses.

== Israel's "sickness unto death", and Hosea's exhortation to repentance (6:1–3) ==
This section continues the passage starting in Hosea 5:8, which concerns the time of the Syro-Ephraimite War (735–733 BCE) and its aftermath (733–731 BCE). Whereas in 5:8–15 Hosea states divine judgment on both Judah and Israel in their internecine strife, that YHWH will send "sickness unto death" (John Day's term), in 6:1–3 he proclaims the hope of revival if the people are willing accept his exhortation to repentance. The editors of the Jerusalem Bible suggest that this penitential prayer of Hosea may have been borrowed from an atonement ritual.

=== Verse 1 ===
Come, and let us return unto the Lord:

for he hath torn, and he will heal us;

he hath smitten, and he will bind us up.

- "Come and let us return unto the Lord": These words should come out of the people's mouth exhorting one another to return to God, instead of going to others, such as to Assyria, because only God who "tore" has the power and the will to "heal" them, and He tore "in order to" heal them, smote them "in order to" bind them up, literally, "smite He and He will bind us up".
- "Let us return": so that God who has "returned to His place" "may return to" His people (Hosea 5:15).
- "He will bind us up": only God can heal and cure Israel (Deuteronomy 32:39); and has been doing that for many hundred years, to "bind up the breach of his people, and heal the stroke of their wound (Isaiah 30:26), when they are truly converted by him.

=== Verse 2 ===
After two days will he revive us: in the third day he will raise us up, and we shall live in his sight.

- "After two days... on the third day": can be rendered as 'after a short while' (cf. the Hebrew vocabulary for measurement of days: 'etmol silsom), 'formerly', literally, 'yesterday, the third day'.

== Israel's political and religious corruption (6:4–11) ==
This section, which continues to 7:16, contains some oracles about Israel's political and religious corruption, because Israel failed to live according to YHWH's demand for steadfast love and knowledge of Him (verses 4–6). Israel's corrupt deeds (verses 7–10) prevent YHWH from restoring the nation (verses 6:11b–7:2).

=== Verse 6 ===
For I desired mercy, and not sacrifice; and the knowledge of God more than burnt offerings.

These words emphasize the importance of 'right moral behavior' above 'ritual', as also similarly stated in other books of the prophets (Isaiah 1:10-17; Jeremiah 7:21–23; Micah 6:6–8).

== See also ==
- Ephraim
- Gilead
- Israel
- Judah
- Related Bible parts: Psalm 1, Isaiah 30, Hosea 5, John 7

== Sources ==
- Collins, John J. (2014). Introduction to the Hebrew Scriptures. Fortress Press. ISBN 9781451469233.
- Day, John (2007). "27. Hosea". In Barton, John; Muddiman, John (eds.). The Oxford Bible Commentary (first (paperback) ed.). Oxford University Press. pp. 571–578. ISBN 978-0199277186.
- Fitzmyer, Joseph A. (2008). A Guide to the Dead Sea Scrolls and Related Literature. Grand Rapids, MI: William B. Eerdmans Publishing Company. ISBN 9780802862419.
- Hayes, Christine (2015). Introduction to the Bible. Yale University Press. ISBN 978-0300188271.
- Ulrich, Eugene, ed. (2010). The Biblical Qumran Scrolls: Transcriptions and Textual Variants. Brill.
- Würthwein, Ernst (1995). The Text of the Old Testament. Translated by Rhodes, Erroll F. Grand Rapids, MI: Wm. B. Eerdmans. ISBN 0-8028-0788-7.
