= John Day (biblical scholar) =

English Old Testament scholar

- Born: 13 September 1948 (age 78); London, England
- Spouses: Jane Mary Day (m. 1981–2021) Jennifer Jones (m. 2023)
- Children: 2

Academic background
- Education: Christ's College, Cambridge (BA, MA, MPhil, PhD)
- Thesis: The Old Testament's Utilisation of Language and Imagery Having Parallels in the Baal Mythology of the Ugaritic Texts (1976)

Academic work
- Discipline: Biblical studies
- Sub-discipline: Old Testament studies
- Institutions: Lady Margaret Hall, Oxford

John Day (born 13 September 1948) is a British scholar of the Old Testament/Hebrew Bible. His research has focused on the relationship between ancient Israelite religion and Canaanite religion, the interpretation of Genesis 1–11, and a range of other topics in Old Testament studies.

== Education and academic career ==
John Day studied theology at Christ's College, Cambridge (1967–1970), concentrating on biblical studies. He graduated with a Bachelor of Arts in 1970, later proceeding to the Master of Arts degree in 1970-72 in accordance with Cambridge practice. He then completed postgraduate study at Cambridge (then known as Theology Part III, now the M.Phil.), specialising in the Old Testament, Biblical Hebrew, and Aramaic.

In 1972–1973 Day spent a year at the Hebrew University of Jerusalem as John Goodenday Fellow. He subsequently returned to Cambridge to undertake doctoral research on Baal mythology and the Old Testament, and was awarded the Ph.D. in 1977.

From 1977 to 1980 he was Research Fellow in Arts at the University of Durham. In 1980 he was appointed to a permanent post at the University of Oxford, combining a university lectureship with a Fellowship and Tutorship in Theology (Old Testament) at Lady Margaret Hall, Oxford. He was promoted to Reader in 1996 and to Professor of Old Testament Studies in 2004. He retired in 2013 and was appointed Emeritus Professor of Old Testament Studies and Emeritus Fellow of Lady Margaret Hall.

During his academic career, Day received a number of honours, including the Dahood Memorial Prize (1984), awarded by the Society of Biblical Literature and Doubleday for an essay on the goddess Asherah; a British Academy Senior Research Fellowship (1995–1996); the Oxford degree of Doctor of Divinity (D.D.) in 2003; and election as President of the Society for Old Testament Study in 2014. In 2026 a Festschrift, Religion in Ancient Israel: Essays in Honour of John Day, edited by Katherine E. Southwood, Stuart Weeks, and H. G. M. Williamson, was published to mark his contribution to Old Testament scholarship.

== Research ==
=== Canaanite religion and the Old Testament ===
In his early work, Day examined the interaction between the religion and mythology of ancient Israel and that of Canaan. His publications from this period include studies of mythological motifs, divine figures, and cultic practices reflected in biblical texts. Major works include God’s Conflict with the Dragon and the Sea, Molech: A God of Human Sacrifice in the Old Testament, and Yahweh and the Gods and Goddesses of Canaan. He also published an award-winning essay on the goddess Asherah and her cult symbol.

During this period Day also identified and edited a manuscript of William Robertson Smith’s Lectures on the Religion of the Semites (second and third series), previously thought to be lost, providing an introduction and critical evaluation.

=== Editing and collaborative scholarship ===
In the middle period of his career, Day undertook extensive editorial work. For more than a decade he organised a series of Oxford Old Testament Seminars on specific themes and edited the resulting volumes. These included King and Messiah in Israel and the Ancient Near East, In Search of Pre-Exilic Israel, Temple and Worship in Biblical Israel, and Prophecy and the Prophets in Ancient Israel.

He also co-edited, with Robert P. Gordon and H. G. M. Williamson, Wisdom in Ancient Israel: Essays in Honour of J. A. Emerton. In addition, Day edited The Recovery of the Ancient Hebrew Language, a study of the lexicographical writings of D. Winton Thomas, including reprints of Thomas’s principal philological articles.

=== Genesis 1–11 ===
In later years Day has focused primarily on Genesis 1–11. He has published a series of essays on these chapters, collected in From Creation to Babel (2013) and From Creation to Abraham (2022). His work in this area combines close philological analysis with attention to the ancient Near Eastern background of the biblical text and to its history of interpretation in Jewish, Christian, and Islamic traditions.

These studies form part of his preparation for A Critical and Exegetical Commentary on Genesis 1–11 for the International Critical Commentary series.

== Personal life ==
Day was married to Jane Osborn, a Philosophy Tutor at Lady Margaret Hall, Oxford, from 1981 until her death in 2021. They adopted two children. In 2023 he married Jennifer Jones, a former schoolteacher and carer.

== Selected publications ==
- Day, John; May, Herbert G.; Hunt, G. N. S.; Hamilton, R. W., eds. (1984). Oxford Bible Atlas (3rd ed.). Oxford: Oxford University Press. ISBN 978-0-191-43452-5. OCLC 10778645.
- Day, John (1985). God's Conflict with the Dragon and the Sea: Echoes of a Canaanite Myth in the Old Testament. University of Cambridge Oriental Publications. Vol. 35. Cambridge: Cambridge University Press. ISBN 978-0-521-25600-1. OCLC 10071909.
- Day, John (1989). Molech: A God of Human Sacrifice in the Old Testament. University of Cambridge Oriental Publications. Vol. 41. Cambridge: Cambridge University Press. ISBN 978-0-521-36474-4. OCLC 19266509.
- Day, John (1990). Psalms. Old Testament Guides. Vol. 14. Sheffield: JSOT Press. ISBN 978-1-850-75703-0. OCLC 22706784.
- Day, John; Gordon, Robert P.; Williamson, H. G. M., eds. (1995). Wisdom in Ancient Israel: Essays in Honour of J. A. Emerton. Cambridge: Cambridge University Press. ISBN 978-0-521-42013-6. OCLC 31013372.
- Day, John, ed. (1998). King and Messiah in Israel and the Ancient Near East: Proceedings of the Oxford Old Testament Seminar. Journal for the Study of the Old Testament: Supplement Series. Vol. 270. Sheffield: Sheffield Academic Press. ISBN 978-1-850-75946-1. OCLC 43952258.
- Day, John (2000). Yahweh and the Gods and Goddesses of Canaan. Journal for the Study of the Old Testament: Supplement Series. Vol. 265. Sheffield: Sheffield Academic Press. ISBN 978-1-850-75986-7. OCLC 45772196.
- Day, John, ed. (2005). Temple and Worship in Biblical Israel: Proceedings of the Oxford Old Testament Seminar. Library of Hebrew Bible/Old Testament Studies. Vol. 422. London; New York: T & T Clark. ISBN 978-0-5670-4262-0. OCLC 58827982.
- Day, John, ed. (2008). In Search of Pre-Exilic Israel: Proceedings of the Oxford Old Testament Seminar. Journal for the Study of the Old Testament: Supplement Series. Vol. 406. London; New York: T & T Clark. ISBN 978-0-5670-8196-4. OCLC 57023578.
- Day, John, ed. (2010). Prophecy and the Prophets in Ancient Israel: Proceedings of the Oxford Old Testament Seminar. Library of Hebrew Bible/Old Testament Studies. Vol. 531. London; New York: T&T Clark. ISBN 978-0-567-47364-6.
- Day, John (2013). The Recovery of the Ancient Hebrew Language: The Lexicographical Writings of D. Winton Thomas. Sheffield: Sheffield Phoenix Press.
- Day, John (2013). From Creation to Babel: Studies in Genesis 1–11. London; New York: Bloomsbury T&T Clark.
- Day, John (2022). From Creation to Abraham: Further Studies in Genesis 1–11. Library of Hebrew Bible/Old Testament Studies. Vol. 726. London: T&T Clark.
- Day, John, ed. (1995). William Robertson Smith: Lectures on the Religion of the Semites, Second and Third Series. Sheffield: Sheffield Academic Press.
- In Search of Pre-Exilic Israel (2004).ISBN 0-567-08206-7, 0-567-08196-6
- Prophecy and the Prophets in Ancient Israel (2010).doi:10.1111/j.1467-9418.2011.00770.x
- Lectures on the Religion of the Semites: Second and Third Series (W. Robertson Smith, ed. Day, 1995).ISBN 9781850755005
- From Creation to Babel: Studies in Genesis 1–11 (2013).ISBN 9780567703101
- From Creation to Abraham: Further Studies in Genesis 1–11 (2021/2022).ISBN 9780567703101
