= Beeri =

Biblical figure

There are two biblical figures named Beeri. The etymology of Beeri (Hebrew: בְּאֵרִי, Bə’êrî) is given as "belonging to a fountain" by Wilhelm Gesenius, but as "expounder" by the International Standard Bible Encyclopedia, and "well" according to the Holman Bible Dictionary.

One biblical Beeri was a Hittite, the father of Judith, one of the wives of Esau (Genesis 26:34), portrayed in the text as a source of grief to her parents-in-law.

According to the Book of Hosea, another Beeri was the father of the prophet Hosea. Jewish tradition says that he only uttered a few words of prophecy, and as they were insufficient to be embodied in a book by themselves, they were incorporated in the Book of Isaiah, viz., verses 19 and 20 of the 8th chapter. As such, Beeri is considered a prophet in Judaism. Beeri was sometimes identified with Beerah (1 Chronicles 5:6), who was taken into exile by the Assyrians. He is also considered holy by Muslims.
