= Book of Hosea =

Book of the Hebrew Bible

The Book of Hosea (Biblical Hebrew: סֵפֶר הוֹשֵׁעַ, romanized: Sēfer Hōšēaʿ) is one of the books of the Twelve Minor Prophets of the Nevi'im ("Prophets") in the Tanakh and a book in the Christian Old Testament, having fourteen chapters in both. According to the traditional order of most Hebrew Bibles, it is the first of the Twelve.

Set around the fall of the northern Kingdom of Israel, the Book of Hosea denounces the worship of gods other than Yahweh (the God of Israel), metaphorically comparing Israel's abandonment of Yahweh to a woman being unfaithful to her husband. According to the book's narrative, the relationship between Hosea and his unfaithful wife Gomer is comparable to the relationship between Yahweh and his unfaithful people Israel: this text "for the first time" describes the latter relationship in terms of a marriage. The eventual reconciliation of Hosea and Gomer is treated as a hopeful metaphor for the eventual reconciliation between Yahweh and Israel.

Some redaction-critical studies of Hosea since the 1980s have postulated that the theological and literary unity was created by editors, though scholars differ significantly in their interpretations of the redaction process, stages, and the extent of the eighth-century BCE prophet's original contributions. Nevertheless, many scholars agree that the bulk of the book was probably composed around the times of Jeroboam II of Israel (c. 793–753 BCE). Hosea is the source of the phrase "reap the whirlwind", which has passed into common usage in English and other languages.

== Background and content ==
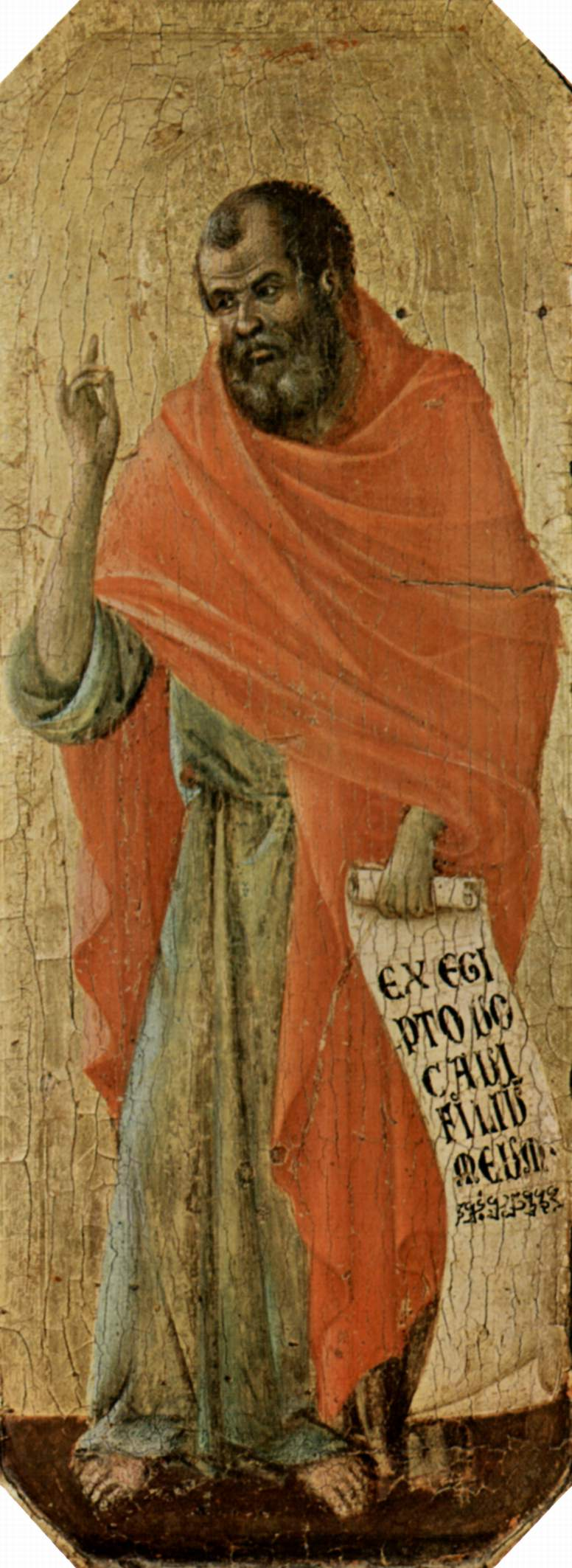
The Prophet Hosea, by Duccio di Buoninsegna, in the Siena Cathedral (c. 1309–1311)

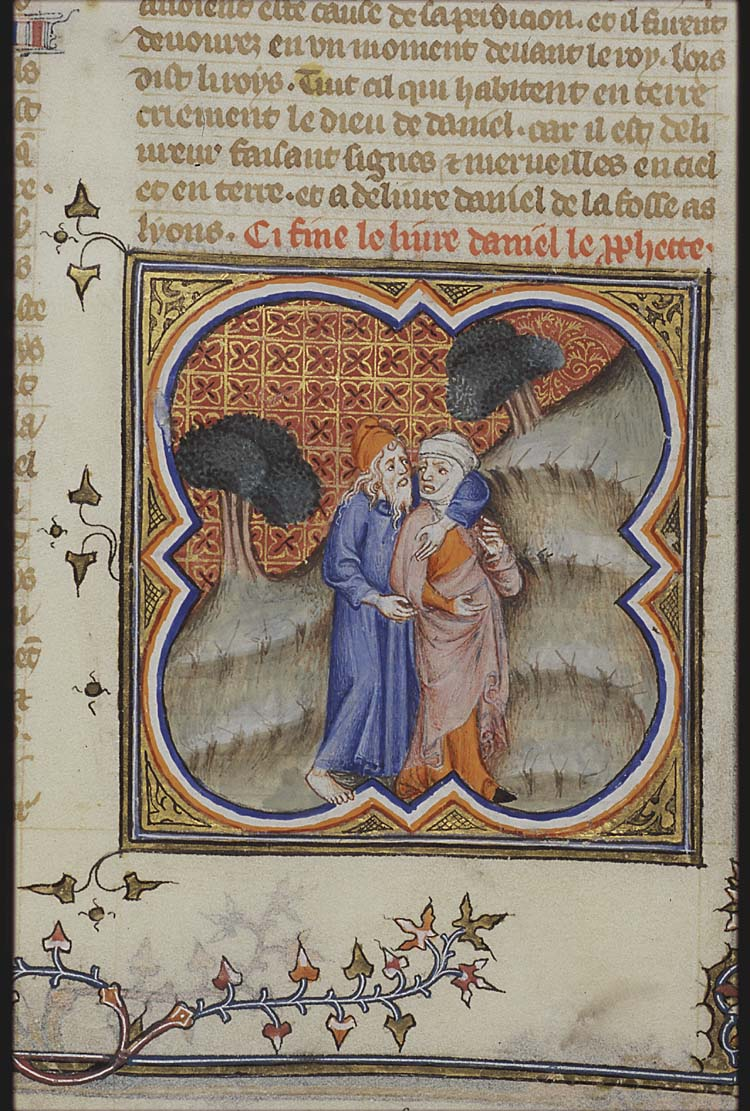
Illustration of Hosea and Gomer from the Bible Historiale, 1372

Hosea prophesied during a dark and melancholic era of Israel's history: the period of the Northern Kingdom's decline and fall in the 8th century BCE. According to the book, the apostasy of the people was rampant, having turned away from God to serve both the calves of Jeroboam and Baal, a Canaanite god.

The Book of Hosea recounts that, during Hosea's lifetime, the kings of the Northern Kingdom, their aristocratic supporters, and the priests had led the people away from the Law of God, as given in the Torah. It reports that they forsook the worship of God; they worshiped other gods, especially Baal, the Canaanite storm god. Other sins followed, recounts the book's author, including homicide, perjury, theft, and adultery. Hosea declares that unless the Israelites' repent of these sins, God will allow their nation to be destroyed, and the people will be taken into captivity by Assyria, the greatest nation of the time.

The prophecy of Hosea centers on God's unending love towards a sinful Israel. In this text, God's agony is expressed over his betrayal by Israel. Stephen Cook asserts that the prophetic efforts of the book can be summed up in this passage: "I have been the LORD your God ever since the land of Egypt; you know no god but me, and besides me there is no savior". Hosea's role was to speak these words during a time when they had been essentially forgotten.

== Summary ==
The Book of Hosea, ascribed in Hosea 1:1 to the prophet Hosea (הוֹשֵׁעַ, Hōšēaʿ, 'Salvation'), contains a number of prophecies and messages from God for both the Kingdom of Judah and the Kingdom of Israel. The prophet's context is predominantly in the Northern Kingdom (i.e., Israel), but there are several references to Judah. (Note: See, for example, Hosea 4:15, 6:11 and 11:12) The editors of the Catholic Jerusalem Bible comment that there had been a tendency among biblical scholars to treat all the references to Judah as later additions, but argued from the 1960s that "more sober conclusions are being urged today". In their opinion, while some references may have been additions, such as Hosea 1:7, 2:1–3, and 14:10, others may indicate that Hosea continued to preach in Judah—the Southern Kingdom—after the fall of Israel.

=== General outline ===
- Chapters 1–2: Hosea's marriage to Gomer (גֹמֶר, Gō'mĕr, 'Complete') is described biographically ("The LORD said to Hosea"), which is a metaphor for the relationship between God and Israel. Chapter two describes a divorce. This divorce seems to be the end of the covenant between God and the Northern Kingdom. However, it is probable that this was again a symbolic act, in which Hosea divorced Gomer for infidelity, and used the occasion to preach the message of God's rejection of the Northern Kingdom. He ends this prophecy with the declaration that God will one day renew the covenant and will take Israel back in love.
- Chapter 3: Hosea's marriage is described autobiographically ("Then the LORD said to me"): this is possibly a marriage to different women. (Note: The editors of the Jerusalem Bible argue that she is the same woman, "Gomer herself".) In chapter three, at God's command, Hosea seeks out Gomer once more. Either she has sold herself into slavery for debt, or she is with a lover who demands money to give her up, because Hosea has to repurchase her. He takes her home, but refrains from sexual intimacy with her for many days, to symbolize the fact that Israel will be without a king for many years, but that God will take Israel back, even at a cost to himself.
- Chapters 4–14:9 & 14:10: Prophecies of the judging of Israel—Ephraim in particular—for not living up to the covenant. The prophecy predicts a future change, though, in which God will pity Israel. Chapters 4–10 contain oracles that explain why God rejects the Northern Kingdom —essentially a divorce. Chapter 11 is God's lament over losing the Northern Kingdom, which he loves, but promises not to abandon them completely. In chapter 12, the prophet pleads for Israel's repentance. Chapter 13 predicts its destruction by Assyria due to lack of repentance. In chapter 14, the prophet calls for forgiveness, promises restoration, and urges fidelity to God. The capital of the Northern Kingdom fell in 722 BCE. All the members of the upper classes and many of the ordinary people were taken captive and carried off to live as prisoners of war.

=== A summary of Hosea's story ===
First, Hosea was directed by God to marry a promiscuous woman of ill repute, and he did so. Marriage here symbolizes the covenantal relationship between God and Israel. However, Israel has been unfaithful to God by following other gods and breaking the commandments, which are the terms of the covenant; hence, Israel is symbolized by a harlot who violates the obligations of marriage to her husband.

Second, Hosea and his wife, Gomer, have a son. God commands that the son be named Jezreel (יִזְרְעֵאל, Yizrəʿēl, 'God sows'). This name refers to Jezreel Valley, in which much blood had been shed in Israel's history, especially by the kings of the Northern Kingdom. The naming of this son was to stand as a prophecy against the reigning house of the Northern Kingdom, that they would pay for that bloodshed.

Third, the couple has a daughter. God commands that she be named Lo-ruhamah (לֹא־רֻחָמָה, 'unloved, or 'pitiful') to show Israel that, though God will still pity Judah, God will no longer pity Israel; its destruction is imminent. In the Christian New International Version, the omission of the word "him" leads to speculation about whether Lo-ruhamah was the daughter of Hosea or of one of Gomer's lovers. James Luther Mays, however, argues that the failure to mention Hosea's paternity is "hardly an implication" of Gomer's adultery.

Fourth, a son is born to Gomer. It is questionable whether this child was Hosea's, for God commands that his name be Lo-ammi (לֹא־עַמִּי, 'Not [of] my people'). The child bore a shame-laden name to show that the Northern Kingdom would also be shamed, for its people would no longer be known as God's people. In other words, the Northern Kingdom had been rejected by God.

== Usage in the New Testament ==
In the Christian New Testament, Matthew 2:13 cites Hosea's prophecy in Hosea 11:1 that God would call his son out of Egypt as foretelling the flight into Egypt and return to Israel of Joseph, Mary, and the infant Jesus.

In Luke 23:30, Jesus is recorded referencing Hosea 10:8 when he says, "Then they will begin to say to the mountains, 'cover us', and to the hills, 'fall on us'." The reference is also echoed in Revelation 6:16.

== Interpretation and context ==
In Hosea 2, the woman in the marriage metaphor could be Hosea's wife, Gomer, or it could refer to the nation of Israel, invoking the metaphor of Israel as God's bride. The woman is not portrayed in a positive light. This is reflected throughout the beginning of Hosea 2:

- "I will strip her naked and expose her as in the day she was born".
- "Upon her children I will have no pity, because they are children of whoredom".
- "For she said, 'I will go after my lovers'..."

Biblical scholar Ehud Ben Zvi reminds readers of the socio-historical context in which Hosea was composed. In his article "Observations on the marital metaphor of YHWH and Israel in its ancient Israelite context: general considerations and particular images in Hosea 1.2", Ben Zvi describes the role of the Gomer in the marriage metaphor as one of the "central attributes of the ideological image of a human marriage that was shared by the male authorship and the primary and intended male readership as building blocks for their imagining of the relationship."

Tristanne J. Connolly makes a similar observation, stating that the husband-wife motif reflects marriage as it was understood at the time. Connolly also suggests that, in context, the marriage metaphor was necessary in that it truly exemplified the unequal interaction between God and the people of Israel. Biblical scholar Michael D. Coogan describes the importance of understanding the covenant in relation to interpreting Hosea. According to Coogan, Hosea falls within a unique genre called "covenant lawsuit", where God accuses Israel of breaking their previously made agreement. God's disappointment with Israel is therefore expressed through the broken marriage covenant made between husband and wife.

Brad E. Kelle refers to "many scholars" finding references to cultic sexual practices in the worship of Baal, in Hosea 2, to be evidence of an historical situation in which Israelites were either giving up Yahweh worship for Baal, or engaging in religious syncretism of the deities, Hosea's references to sexual acts being metaphors for Israelite 'apostasy'.

Hosea 13:1–3 describes how the Israelites are abandoning Yahweh for the worship of Baal, and accuses them of making or using molten images for idol worship. Chief among these was the image of the bull at the northern shrine of Bethel, which by the time of Hosea was being worshipped as an image of Baal.

== Theological contribution ==
Hosea portrays a message of repentance to God's people. Through Hosea's marriage to Gomer, God shows his great love for his people, comparing himself to a husband whose wife has committed adultery, using this image as a metaphor for the covenant between God and Israel. God's love was "misunderstood" by his people. Hosea influenced latter prophets such as Jeremiah. He is among the first writing prophets, and Hosea 14, the book's final chapter, has a format similar to wisdom literature.

Like Amos, Hosea elevated the religion of Israel to the altitude of ethical monotheism, being the first to emphasize the moral side of God's nature. Israel's faithlessness, which resisted all warnings, compelled him to punish the people because of his own holiness. Hosea considers infidelity as the chief sin, of which Israel, the adulterous wife, has been guilty against her loving husband, God. Against this, he sets the unquenchable love of God, who, despite this infidelity, does not cast Israel away forever, but will draw his people to himself again after the judgment.

== See also ==
- Redeeming Love, a 1991 historical romance novel inspired by the book
  - Redeeming Love (2022 film), a film based on the novel

== Notes ==
Book of Hosea Minor prophets
Preceded by Ezekiel	Hebrew Bible	Succeeded by Joel
Preceded by Daniel	Christian; Old Testament	Succeeded by Joel
