= Eugene Ulrich =

American Dead Sea Scrolls scholar (born 1938)

- Born: November 5, 1938 (age 87)
- Awards: Guggenheim Fellowship

Academic background
- Education: Xavier University; Loyola University; Woodstock College; Harvard University

Academic work
- Institutions: University of Notre Dame
- Main interests: Dead Sea Scrolls
- Notable works: Discoveries in the Judaean Desert

Eugene "Gene" Charles Ulrich (born November 5, 1938) is an American Dead Sea Scrolls scholar and the John A. O'Brien Professor emeritus of Hebrew Scripture and Theology in the Department of Theology at the University of Notre Dame. He is chief editor of the biblical texts of the Dead Sea Scrolls and one of the three general editors of the Scrolls International Publication Project.

== Biography ==
=== Early life and education ===
Eugene Ulrich was born in Louisville, Kentucky. He has the following degrees: Litt.B., Xavier University. From 1964 he holds his Ph.L. from Loyola University Chicago. In 1970 he earned his M.Div. at Woodstock College. He then entered Harvard University and obtained his M.A. in 1967 and in 1975 his Ph.D.

=== Career ===
Ulrich co-authored The Dead Sea Scrolls Bible with Martin Abegg and Peter Flint. He is also a member of the translation teams of the New Revised Standard Version of the Bible, the Modern English Version, and the New American Bible. He is a specialist in the texts of the Septuagint, the Dead Sea Scrolls and the Hebrew Scriptures.

As Chief Editor of the Dead Sea Scrolls he published five volumes of critical editions in Discoveries in the Judaean Desert (Oxford) and was an Area Editor for Oxford's Encyclopedia of the Dead Sea Scrolls. Ulrich has worked under two editors in chief on the scrolls project, namely John Strugnell and Emanuel Tov.

Appointed to the Grinfield Lecturership at the University of Oxford (1998–2000), he was twice elected as President of the International Organization for Septuagint and Cognate Studies and was invited as a Fellow of the Institute for Advanced Studies at the Hebrew University of Jerusalem. Recently, he was elected as President of the Catholic Biblical Association and as a Fellow of the American Academy of Arts and Sciences.

Ulrich is the John A. O'Brien Professor emeritus of Hebrew Scripture and Theology in the Department of Theology at the University of Notre Dame.

== Awards ==
Ulrich received the Award Medal of the University of Helsinki, a Guggenheim Fellowship, and several grants from the National Endowment for the Humanities.

- In 1981 he received the Guggenheim Fellowship.
- In 2001 he received the Fellow of the American Academy of Arts and Sciences's award.

== Publications ==
- Discoveries in the Judaean Desert, Volume XII. Qumran Cave 4: VII: Genesis to Numbers Edited by Eugene Ulrich, Frank Moore Cross and James R. Davila, Published by the Oxford University Press
- The Dead Sea Scrolls and the Origins of the Bible. Wm. B. Eerdmans. 1999-07-15. ISBN 9780802846112.
  - The Dead Sea Scrolls and the Origins of the Bible. Brill. 1999-08-25. doi:10.1163/9789004677135. ISBN 978-90-04-11493-7.
- Ulrich, Eugene; Abegg, Martin; Flint, Peter (2002-10-22). The Dead Sea Scrolls Bible. HarperCollins. ISBN 9780060600648.
- Modern English Version: Amos, Edited by Eugene Ulrich, Stanley M. Horton and James F. Linzey, Published by Passio
