= Ephraim =

Person in the Book of Genesis

- אֶפְרַיִם
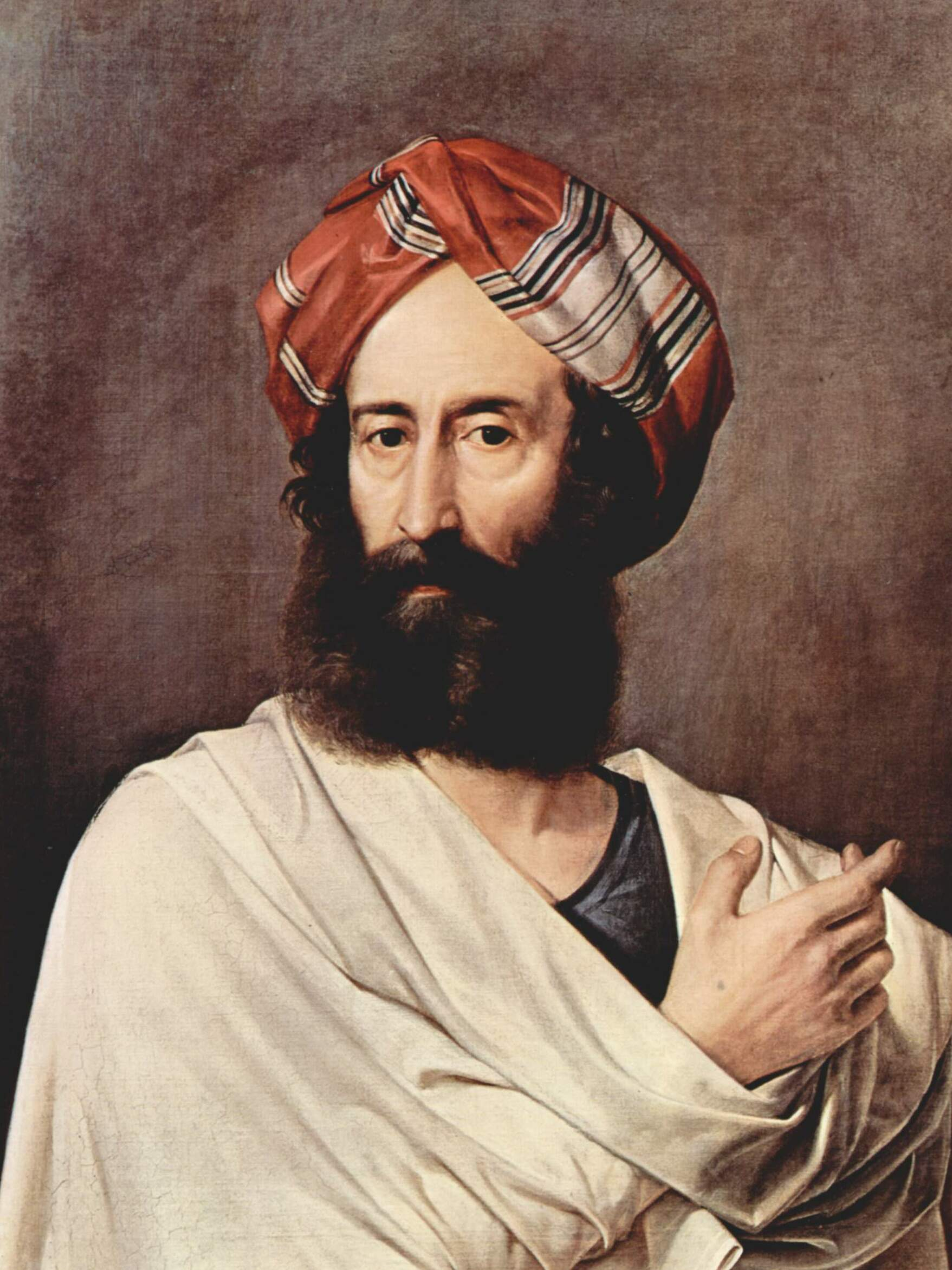
- Ephraim, son of Joseph (1843) by Francesco Hayez
- Born: 2200 AM (c. 1560 BC); Avaris, Second Intermediate Period of Egypt (present-day Sharqia, Egypt)
- Died: unknown
- Parents: Joseph (father); Asenath (mother)
- Relatives: Manasseh (brother); Rachel (grandmother); Jacob (grandfather); Reuben (uncle); Simeon (uncle); Levi (uncle); Judah (uncle); Dinah (aunt); Dan (uncle); Naphtali (uncle); Gad (uncle); Asher (uncle); Issachar (uncle); Zebulun (uncle); Benjamin (uncle)

Ephraim (/ˈiːfriəm/; Hebrew: אֶפְרַיִם, romanized: ʾEp̄rayīm, in pausa: אֶפְרָיִם ʾEp̄rāyīm) was, according to the Book of Genesis, the second son of Joseph ben Jacob and Asenath, as well as the adopted son of his biological grandfather Jacob, making him the progenitor of the Tribe of Ephraim.

Asenath was an Egyptian woman whom Pharaoh gave to Joseph as wife, and daughter of Potipherah, priest of ʾOn (Heliopolis) (אָֽסְנַ֔ת בַּת־פּ֥וֹטִי פֶ֖רַע כֹּהֵ֥ן אֽוֹן). Ephraim was born in Egypt before the arrival of the Israelites from Canaan.

The Book of Numbers lists three sons of Ephraim: Shuthelah, Beker, and Tahan. However, 1 Chronicles 7 lists eight sons, including Ezer and Elead, who were killed in an attempt to steal cattle from the locals. After their deaths he had another son, Beriah. He was the ancestor of Joshua, son of Nun ben Elishama, the leader of the Israelite tribes in the conquest of Canaan.

According to the biblical narrative, Jeroboam, who became the first king of the Northern Kingdom of Israel, was also from the house of Ephraim.

== Biblical criticism ==
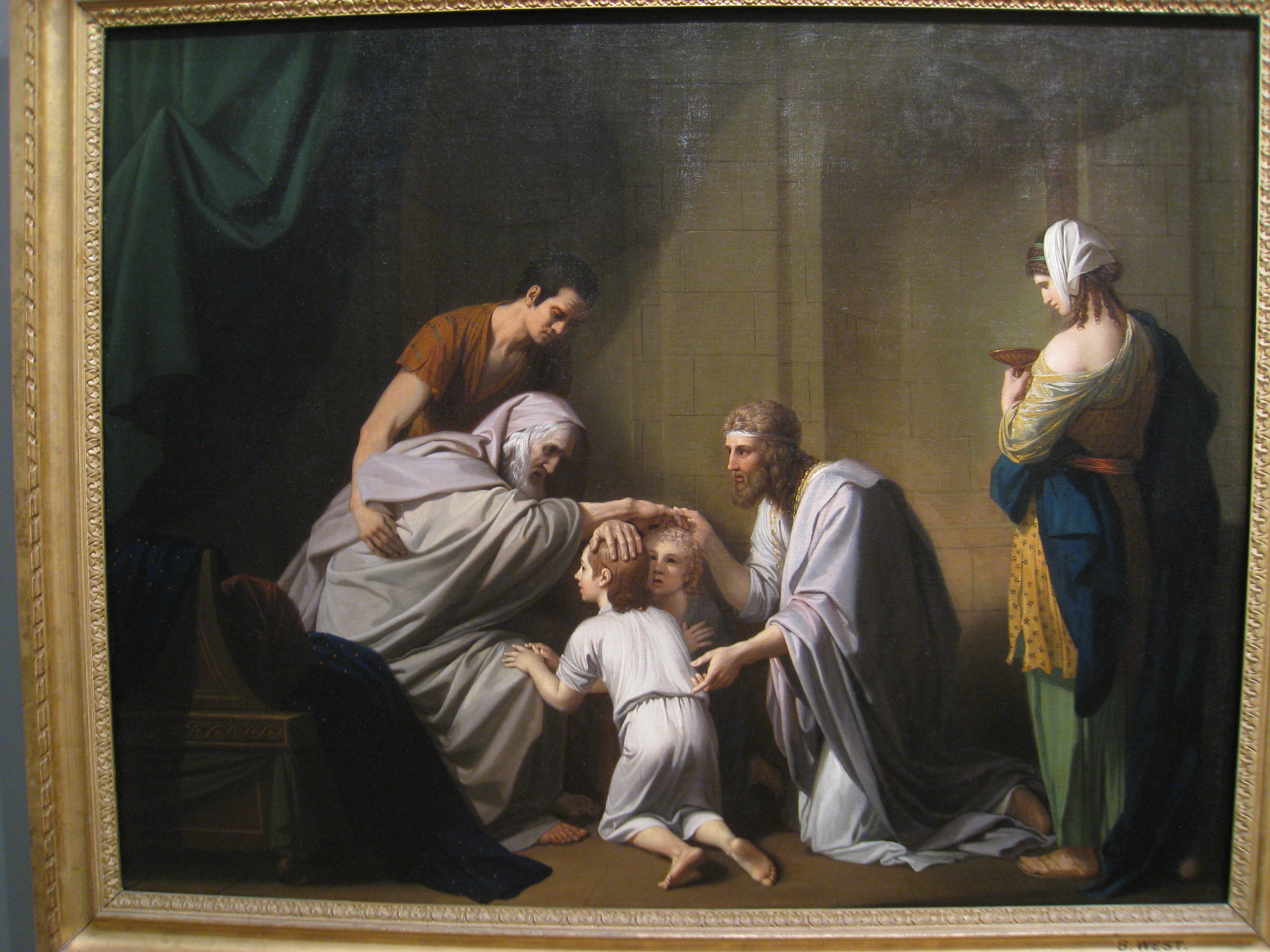
Jacob blessing Ephraim and Manasseh, by Benjamin West, 1766–68

The Book of Genesis related the name "Ephraim" to the Hebrew root פָּרָה pārā "to be fruitful". This referring to Joseph's ability to produce children, specifically while in Egypt (termed by the Torah as "the land of his affliction"). The name Ephraim can therefore be translated as "I will be fruitful", with the prefix of aleph (א) indicating the first person, singular, future tense.

In the biblical account, Joseph's other son is Manasseh. Joseph himself is one of the two children of Rachel and Jacob, the other being Benjamin. Biblical scholars regard it as obvious, from their geographic overlap and their treatment in older passages, that originally Ephraim and Manasseh were considered one tribe – that of Joseph. The Jewish Encyclopedia proposes that Benjamin was originally part of the suggested Ephraim-Manasseh single "Joseph" tribe, but the biblical account of Joseph as his father became lost. Israel Finkelstein suspects that the distinction of the Joseph tribes (including the Tribe of Benjamin) is that they were the only Israelites who went to Egypt and returned, while the main Israelite tribes simply emerged as a subculture from the Canaanites and had remained in Canaan throughout. According to this view, the story of Jacob's visit to Laban to obtain a wife originated as a metaphor for this migration, with the property and family which were gained from Laban representing the gains of the Joseph tribes by the time they returned from Egypt; according to textual scholars, the Jahwist version of the Laban narrative only mentions the Joseph tribes, and Rachel, and does not mention the other tribal matriarchs at all.

In the Torah, the eventual precedence of the tribe of Ephraim is argued to derive from Jacob, half blind and on his deathbed, blessing Ephraim before Manasseh. The text describing this blessing features a hapax legomenon – the word שכל (sh-k-l) – which classical rabbinical literature has interpreted in esoteric manners; some rabbinical sources connect the term with sekel, meaning mind/wisdom, and view it as indicating that Jacob was entirely aware of who he was actually blessing; other rabbinical sources connect the term with shikkel, viewing it as signifying that Jacob was despoiling Manasseh in favour of Ephraim; yet other rabbinical sources argue that it refers to the power of Jacob to instruct and guide the Holy Spirit. In classical rabbinical sources, Ephraim is described as being modest and not selfish. These rabbinical sources allege that it was on account of modesty and selflessness, and a prophetic vision of Joshua, that Jacob gave Ephraim precedence over Manasseh, the elder of the two; in these sources Jacob is regarded as being sufficiently just that God upholds the blessing in his honour, and makes Ephraim the leading tribe.

== See also ==
- Manasseh
- Tribe of Ephraim
- Tribe of Manasseh
