= List of manuscripts from Qumran Cave 4 =

List of the manuscripts from Qumran Cave 4
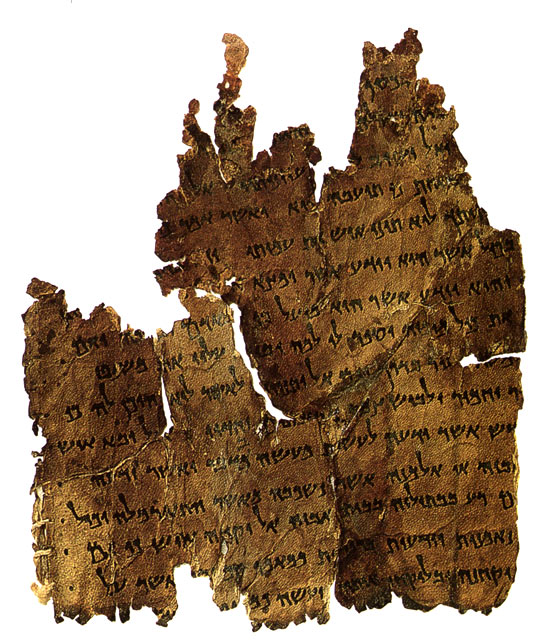
- The Damascus Document Scroll, 4Q271D^{f}, found in Cave 4.
- Material: Parchment, Papyrus
- Writing: Hebrew, Aramaic, Greek
- Created: Est. 408 BCE to 318 CE
- Discovered: 1952
- Present location: Qumran

The following is a list of the Dead Sea Scrolls from the cave 4 near Qumran. Cave 4 is by far the most productive of all Qumran Caves, producing ninety percent of the Dead Sea Scrolls and scroll fragments (approx. 15,000 fragments from 500 different texts), including 9–10 copies of Jubilees, along with 21 tefillin and 7 mezuzot, as well as fragments from a scroll containing Exodus and Genesis written in Paleo-Hebrew.

== Description ==
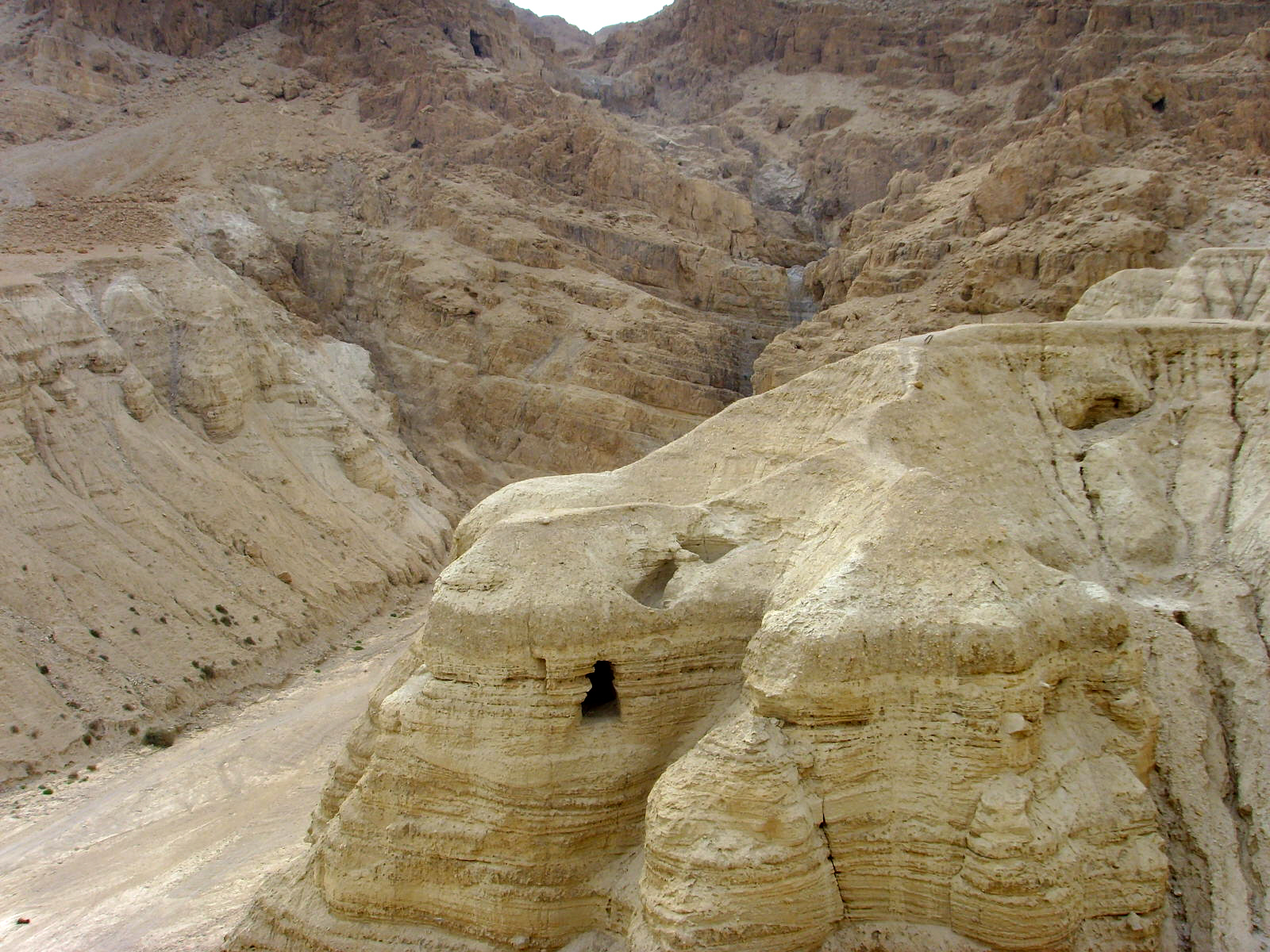
Qumran Cave 4, where ninety percent of the scrolls were found.

Wadi Qumran Cave 4 was discovered in August 1952, and was excavated from 22–29 September 1952 by Gerald Lankester Harding, Roland de Vaux, and Józef Milik. Cave 4 is actually two hand-cut caves (4a and 4b), but since the fragments were mixed, they are labeled as 4Q. Cave 4 is the most famous of the Qumran Caves both because of its visibility from the Qumran plateau and its productivity. It is visible from the plateau to the south of the Qumran settlement. It is by far the most productive of all Qumran Caves, producing ninety percent of the Dead Sea Scrolls and scroll fragments (approx. 15,000 fragments from 500 different texts), including 9–10 copies of Jubilees, along with 21 tefillin and 7 mezuzot, as well as fragments from a scroll containing Exodus and Genesis written in Paleo-Hebrew.

== List of manuscripts ==
Some resources for more complete information on the scrolls are the book by Emanuel Tov, "Revised Lists of the Texts from the Judaean Desert" for a complete list of all of the Dead Sea Scroll texts, as well as the online webpages for the Shrine of the Book and the Leon Levy Collection, both of which present photographs and images of the scrolls and fragments themselves for closer study. Information is not always comprehensive, as content for many scrolls has not yet been fully published.

=== 4Q1–4Q100 ===
Fragment or scroll identifier	Fragment or scroll name	Alternative identifier	English Bible Association	Language	Date/script	Description	Reference
Qumran Cave 4
4QGen-Exod^{a}	Genesis–Exodus	4Q1	Genesis 8:20–21; Exodus 1–4; 5:3–17; 6:4–21,25; 7:5–13,15–20; 8:20–22; 9:8; 22:14; 27:38–39,42–43; 34:17–21	Hebrew	Hasmonean	Fragments from Genesis to Numbers	
4QGen^{b}	Genesis	4Q2	Genesis 1:1–27; 2:14–19; 4:2–4; 5:13	Hebrew	Roman	Fragment of Genesis	
4QGen^{c}	Genesis	4Q3	Genesis 40–41	Hebrew	Herodian	Fragments of Genesis	
4QGen^{d}	Genesis	4Q4	Genesis 1:18–27	Hebrew	Hasmonean	Fragments of Genesis on the Beginning of Creation	
4QGen^{e}	Genesis	4Q5	Genesis 36–37; 40–43; 49	Hebrew	Herodian	Fragments of Genesis	
4QGen^{f}	Genesis	4Q6	Genesis 48:1–11	Hebrew	Hasmonean	Fragments of Genesis	
4QGen^{g}	Genesis	4Q7	Genesis 1:1–11,13–22; 2:6–7	Hebrew	Hasmonean	Fragments of Genesis about Creation	
4QGen^{h}/4QGen^{h1}	Genesis	4Q8	Genesis 1:8–10	Hebrew	Herodian	Fragments of Genesis about the beginning to early mankind.	
4QGen^{h2}	Genesis	4Q8a	Genesis 2:17–18	Hebrew	Herodian	Fragments of Genesis about the beginning to early mankind.	
4QGen^{h-para}	Genesis	4Q8b	Genesis 12:4–5	Hebrew	Herodian	A paraphrase of Genesis	
4QGen^{h-title}	Genesis	4Q8c	Genesis	Hebrew	Herodian	The title of a Genesis manuscript	
4QGen^{j}	Genesis	4Q9	Genesis 41–43; 45	Hebrew	Herodian	Fragments of Genesis	
4QGen^{k}	Genesis	4Q10	Genesis 1:9,14–16,27–28; 2:1–3; 3:1–2	Hebrew	Herodian	Fragments of Genesis	
4QpaleoGen-Exod^{l}	Paleo-Genesis/Exodus	4Q11	Genesis 50:26; Exodus 1:1–5; 2:10,22–25; 3:1–4,17–21; 8:13–15, 19–21; 9:25–29, 33–35; 10:1–5; 11:4–10; 12:1–11, 42–46; 14:15–24; 16:2–7, 13–14,18–20,23–25,26–31,33–35; 17:1–3,5–11; 18:17–24; 19:24–25; 20:1–2; 22:23–24; 23:5–16; 25:7–20; 26:29–37; 27:1, 6–14; 28:33–35,40–42; 36:34–36	Hebrew	Hasmonean; Paleo-Hebrew script	Fragments of Genesis and Exodus	
4QpaleoGen^{m}	Paleo-Genesis	4Q12	Genesis 26:21–28; Exodus 6:25–30; 7:1–19,29; 8:1,5,12–26; 9:5–16,19–21,35; 10:1–12,19–28; 11:8–10; 12:1–2,6–8,13–15,17–22,31–32,34–39; 13:3–7,12–13; 14:3–5,8–9,25–26; 15:23–27; 16:1,4–5,7–8,31–35; 17:1–16; 18:1–27; 19:1,7–17,23–25; 20:1,18–19; 21:5–6, 13–14,22–32; 22:3–4,6–7,11–13,16–30; 23:15–16,19–31; 24:1–4,6–11; 25:11–12,20–29,31–34; 26:8,15,21–30; 27:1–3,9–14,18–19; 28:3–4,8–12,22–24,26–28,30–43; 29:1–5,20,22–25,31–41; 30:10,12–18,29–31,34–38; 31:1–8,13–15; 32:2–19,25–30; 33:12–23; 34:1–3,10–13,15–18,20–24,27–28; 35:1; 36:21–24; 37:9–16	Hebrew	Hasmonean; Paleo-Hebrew script	Fragment from Genesis	
4QExod^{b}	Exodus	4Q13	Exodus 1:1–6,16–12; 2:2–18; 3:13 – 4:8; 5:3–14	Hebrew	Herodian	Fragments of Exodus about Slavery in Egypt	
4QExod^{c}	Exodus	4Q14	Exodus 7:17–19,20–23; 7:26 – 8:1; 8:5–14,16–18,22; 9:10–11,15–20,22–25,27–35; 10:1–5,7–9,12–19,23–24; 11:9–10; 12:12–16,31–48; 13:18 – 14:3; 14:3–13; 17:1 – 18:12	Hebrew	Herodian	Fragments of Exodus	
4QExod^{d}	Exodus	4Q15	Exodus 13:15–16 followed directly by 15:1	Hebrew	Hasmonean	Fragments of Exodus about the Passover and a Hymn	
4QExod^{e}	Exodus	4Q16	Exodus 13:3–5,15–16	Hebrew	Hasmonean	Fragments of Exodus about the Passover and a Hymn	
4QExod-Lev^{f}	Exodus–Leviticus	4Q17	Exodus 38:18–22; 39:3–19, 20–24; 40:8–27; Leviticus 1:13–15, 17–2:1	Hebrew	Early Hellenistic	Fragments of Exodus and Leviticus	
4QExod^{g}	Exodus	4Q18	Exodus 14:21–27	Hebrew	Hasmonean	Fragments of Exodus	
4QExod^{h}	Exodus	4Q19	Exodus 6:3–6	Hebrew	Herodian	Fragments of Exodus	
4QExod^{j}	Exodus	4Q20	Exodus 7:28–8:2	Hebrew	Herodian	Fragments of Exodus	
4QExod^{k}	Exodus	4Q21	Exodus 36:9–10	Hebrew	Roman	Fragments of Exodus	
4QpaleoExod^{m} (olim 4QExα)	Paleo-Exodus	4Q22	Exodus 6:25–7:19,29–8:1,[5],12–22; 9:5–16, 19–21, 35–10:12, 19–28; 11:8–12:2,6–8, 13–15, 17–22, 31–32, 34–39; 13:3–8, 12–13; ... 37:9–16	Hebrew	Hasmonean; Paleo-Hebrew script	Fragments of Exodus;	
4QLev-Num^{a}	Leviticus–Numbers	4Q23	Leviticus 13:32-33; 14:22-34; 14:40-54; 15:10-11; 15:19-24; 16:15-29; 18:16-21; 19:3-8; 24:11-12; 26:26; 26:28-33; 27:5-22. Numbers 1:1-5; 1:21-22; 1:36-40; 2:18; 2:20; 2:31-32; 3:3-16; 3:18-19; 3:51; 4:1-12; 4:40-49; 5:1-9; 8:7-12; 8:21-22; 9:3-10; 9:19-20; 10:13-23; 11:4-5; 11:16-22; 12:3-12; 13:21; 22:5-6; 22:22-24; 26:5-7; 30:7; 32:8-15; 32:23-25; 32:27-42; 33:4-9; 33:22; 33:25; 33:28; 33:31; 33:33-34; 33:52-54; 35:4-5.	Hebrew	Hasmonean	Fragments of Leviticus	
4QLev^{b}	Leviticus	4Q24	Leviticus 1:11–17; 2:1–15; 3:1, 8–14; 21:17–20, 24; 22:1–33; 23:1–25, 40; 24:2–23; 25:28–29, 45–49, 51–52	Hebrew	Hasmonean	Fragments of Leviticus	
4QLev^{c}	Leviticus	4Q25	Leviticus 1:1–7; 3:16–4:6, 12–14, 23–28; 5:12–13; 8:26–28	Hebrew	Hellenistic-Roman	Fragments of Leviticus	
4QLev^{d}	Leviticus	4Q26	Leviticus 14:27–29, 33–36; 15:20–24; 17:2–11	Hebrew	Hellenistic-Roman	Fragments of Leviticus	
4QLev^{e}	Leviticus	4Q26a	Leviticus 2:4–6, 11–18; 3:2–4,5–8; 19:34–37; 20:1–3, 27–21:4, 9–12, 21–24; 22:4–6, 11–17	Hebrew	Hellenistic-Roman	Fragments of Leviticus	
4QLev^{g}	Leviticus	4Q26b	Leviticus 7:19–26	Hebrew	Hellenistic-Roman	Fragments of Leviticus	
4QNum^{b}	Numbers	4Q27	Numbers 11:31–12:11; 13:7–24; 15:41–16:11, 14–16; 17:12–17; 18:25–19:6; 20:12–13,16–17,19–29; 21:1–2,12–13; 22:5–21, 31–34, 37–38, 41–23:6,13–15,21–22, 27–24:10; 25:4–8,16–18; 26:1–5,7–10,12,14–34,62–27:5,7–8,10,18–19,21–23; 28:13–17,28,30–31; 29:10–13,16–18,26–30; 30:1–3,5–9,15–16; 31:2–6, 21–25, 30–33,35–36,38,43–44,46–32:1,7–10,13–17,19,23–30,35,37–39,41; 33:1–4,23,25,28,31,45,47–48,50–52; 34:4–9,19–21,23; 35:3–5,12,14–15,18–25,27–28, 33–36:2,4–7	Hebrew	Herodian	Fragments of Numbers. A few lines are written in red ink	
4QDeut^{a}	Deuteronomy	4Q28	Deuteronomy 23:26–24:8	Hebrew	175–150 BCE Transitional: Archaic to Hasmonean	Fragments of Deuteronomy	
4QDeut^{b}	Deuteronomy	4Q29	Deuteronomy 29:24–27; 30:3–14; 31:9–17,24–30, 32:1–3	Hebrew	150–100 BCE Early Hasmonean	Fragments of Deuteronomy	
4QDeut^{c}	Deuteronomy	4Q30	Deuteronomy 3:25–26; 4:13–17,31–32; 7:3–4; 8:1–5; 9:11–12, 17–19,29; 10:1–2,5–8; 11:2–4,9–13,18–19; 12:18–19,26,30–31; 13:5–7,11–12,16; 15:1–5,15–19; 16:2–3,5–11,20–17:7,15–18:1; 26:19— 27:2,24–28:14,18–20,22–25,29–30,48–50,61; 29:17–19; 31:16–19; 32:3	Hebrew	150–100 BCE Hasmonean	Fragments of Deuteronomy	
4QDeut^{d}	Deuteronomy	4Q31	Deuteronomy 2:24–33; 3:14–29; 4:1	Hebrew	124–75 BCE Middle Hasmonean	Fragments of Deuteronomy	
4QDeut^{e}	Deuteronomy	4Q32	Deuteronomy 3:24; 7:12–16,21–26; 8:1–16	Hebrew	50–25 BCE Late Hasmonean	Fragments of Deuteronomy	
4QDeut^{f}	Deuteronomy	4Q33	Deuteronomy 4:23–27; 7:22–26; 8:2–14; 9:6–7; 17:17–18; 18:6–10,18–22; 19:17–21; 20:1–6; 21:4–12; 22:12–19; 23:21–26; 24:2–7; 25:3–9; 26:18–27:10	Hebrew	75–50 BCE Late Hasmonean	Fragments of Deuteronomy	
4QDeut^{g}	Deuteronomy	4Q34	Deuteronomy 9:12–14; 23:18–20; 24:16–22; 25:1–5,14–19; 26:1–5; 28:21–25,27–29	Hebrew	1–25 CE Middle Herodian	Fragments of Deuteronomy	
4QDeut^{h}	Deuteronomy	4Q35	Deuteronomy 1:1–17,22–23,29–41,43–2:6,28–30; 19:21; 31:9–11; 33:9–22	Hebrew	50–1 BCE Transitional: Hasmonean to Early Herodian	Fragments of Deuteronomy	
4QDeut^{i}	Deuteronomy	4Q36	Deuteronomy 20:9–13; 21:23; 22:1–9; 23:6–8, 12–16, 22–26; 24:1	Hebrew	100–50 BCE Late Hasmonean	Fragments of Deuteronomy	
4QDeut^{j}	Deuteronomy	4Q37	Exodus 12:43–44, 46–51; 13:1–5; Deuteronomy 5:1–11, 13–15, 21–33; 6:1–3; 8:5–10; 11:6–10, 12–13; 30:17–18; 32:7–8	Hebrew	50 CE Late Herodian	Fragments of Exodus and Deuteronomy	
4QDeut^{k1}	Deuteronomy	4Q38	Deuteronomy 5:28–31; 11:6–13; 32:17–18, 22–23, 25–27	Hebrew	30–1 BCE Early Herodian	Fragments of Deuteronomy	
4QDeut^{k2}	Deuteronomy	4Q38a	Deuteronomy 19: 8–16; 20: 6–19; 21:16; 23:22–26; 24:1–3; 25:19; 26:1–5, 18–19; 27:1	Hebrew	30–1 BCE Early Herodian	Fragments of Deuteronomy	
4QDeut^{k3}	Deuteronomy	4Q38b	Deuteronomy 30: 16–18	Hebrew	50 CE Late Herodian	Fragments of Deuteronomy	
4QDeut^{l}	Deuteronomy	4Q39	Deuteronomy 10:1,14–15; 28:67–68; 29:2–5; 31:12; 33:1–2; 34:4–6,8	Hebrew	50 CE Late Hasmonean	Fragments of Deuteronomy about choosing Life or Death	
4QDeut^{m}	Deuteronomy	4Q40	Deuteronomy 3:18–22; 4:32–33; 7:18–22	Hebrew	50–1 BCE Transitional: Hasmonean to Herodian	Fragments of Deuteronomy	
4QDeut^{n}	All Souls Deuteronomy	4Q41	Deuteronomy 5:1–33; 6:1; 8:5–10	Hebrew	30–1 BCE Early Herodian	Fragments of Deuteronomy	
4QDeut^{o}	Deuteronomy	4Q42	Deuteronomy 2:8; 4:30–34; 5:1–5, 8–9; 28:15–18, 33–36, 47–52, 58–62; 29:22–25	Hebrew	75–50 BCE Late Hasmonean	Fragments of Deuteronomy	
4QDeut^{p}	Deuteronomy	4Q43	Deuteronomy 6:4–11	Hebrew	75–50 BCE Late Hasmonean	Fragments of Deuteronomy about Loving God	
4QDeut^{q}	Deuteronomy	4Q44	Deuteronomy 32:9–10, 37–43	Hebrew	50 BCE–25 CE Late Hasmonean or Early Herodian	Fragments of Deuteronomy	
4QpaleoDeut^{r}	Paleo-Deuteronomy	4Q45	Deuteronomy 7:2–7, 16–25; 11:28,30–12:1,11–12; 13:19; 14:19–22, 26–29; 15:5–6, 8–10; 19:2–3; 21:8–9; 22:3–6,12–15; 28:15–18, 20; 30:7–8; 32:2–8,10–11,13–14, 33–35; 33:2–8, 29; 34:1–2	Hebrew	100–25 BCE Paleo-Hebrew script	Fragments of Deuteronomy	
4QpaleoDeut^{s}	Paleo-Deuteronomy	4Q46	Deuteronomy 26:14–15	Hebrew	250–200 BCE Archaic Paleo-Hebrew script	Fragments of Deuteronomy about giving Tithes	
4QJosh^{a}	Joshua	4Q47	Joshua 8:34–35; 5:?,2–7; 6:5–10; 7:12–17; 8:3–14, 18?; 10:2–5, 8–11.	Hebrew	Hasmonean	Fragments of Joshua	
4QJosh^{b}	Joshua	4Q48	Joshua 2:11–12; 3:15–16; 4:1–3; 17:11–15	Hebrew	Hasmonean	Fragments of Joshua	
4QJudg^{a}	Judges	4Q49	Judges 6:2–6, 11–13	Hebrew	Herodian	Fragments of Judges	
4QJudg^{b}	Judges	4Q50	Judges 19:5–7; 21:12–25	Hebrew	Herodian	Fragments of Judges	
4QSam^{a}	Samuel	4Q51	1 Samuel 1:9, 11–13, 17–18, 22–26, 28; 2:1–10,16–36; 3:1–4,18–21; 4:9–12; 5:8–12; 6:1–7,12–13,16–18,20–21; 7:1; 8:9–20; 9:6–8,11–12,16–24; 10:3–18,25–27; 11:1,7–12; 12:7–8,14–19; 14:24–25,28–34,47–51; 15:24–32; 17:3–6; 24:4–5,8–9,14–23; 25:3–12,20–21,25–26,39–40; 26:10–12,21–23; 27:8–12; 28:1–2,22–25; 30:28–30; 31:2–4; 2 Samuel 2:5–16,25–27,29–32; 3:1–8,23–39; 4:1–4,9–12; 5:1–3,6–16; 6:2–9,12–18; 7:23–29; 8:2–8; 10:4–7,18–19; 11:2–12,16–20; 12:4–5,8–9,13–20,30–31; 13:1–6,13–34,36–39; 14:1–3,18–19; 15:1–6,27–31; 16:1–2,11–13,17–18,21–23; 18:2–7,9–11; 19:7–12; 20:2–3,9–14,23–26; 21:1–2,4–6,15–17; 22:30–51; 23:1–6; 24:16–20	Hebrew	Herodian	Fragments of 1 Samuel and 2 Samuel	
4QSam^{b}	Samuel	4Q52	1 Samuel 16:1–11; 19:10–17; 20:27–42; 21:1–10; 23:9–17	Hebrew	Early Hellenistic	Fragments of 1 Samuel	
4QSam^{c}	Samuel	4Q53	1 Samuel 25:30–32; 2 Samuel 14:7–33; 15:1–15	Hebrew	Hasmonean	Fragments of 1 Samuel and 2 Samuel	
4QKgs	Kings	4Q54	1 Kings 7:31–41; 8:1–9,16–18	Hebrew	Herodian	Fragments of 1 Kings	
4QIsa^{a}	Isaiah	4Q55	Isaiah 1:1–3; 2:7–10; 4:5–6; 6:4–7; 11:12–15; 12:4–6; 13:4–6; 17:9–14; 19:9–14; 20:1–6; 21:1–2,4–16; 22:13–25; 23:1–12	Hebrew	Hasmonean	Fragments of Isaiah	
4QIsa^{b}	Isaiah	4Q56	Isaiah 1:1–6; 2:3–16; 3:14–22; 5:15–28; 9:10–11; 11:7–9; 12:2; 13:3–18; 17:8–14; 18:1,5–7; 19:1–25; 20:1–4; 21:11–14; 22:24–25; 24:2; 26:1–5,7–19; 35:9–10; 36:1–2; 37:2932; 39:1–8; 40:1–4,22–26; 41:8–11; 43:12–15; 44:19–28; 45:20–25; 46:1–3; 49:21–23; 51:14–16; 52:2,7; 53:11–12; 61:1–3; 64:5–11; 65:1; 66:24	Hebrew	Herodian	Fragments of Isaiah	
4QIsa^{c}	Isaiah	4Q57	Isaiah 9:3–12; 10:23–32; 11:4–11,15–16; 12:1; 14:1–5,13; 22:10–14; 23:8–18; 24:1–15,19–23; 25:1–2,8–12; 30:8–17; 33:2–8,16–23; 45:1–4,6–13; 48:10–13,17–19; 50:7–11; 51:1–16; 52:10–15; 53:1–3,6–8; 54:3–17; 55:1–6; 66:20–24	Hebrew	Herodian	Fragments of Isaiah	
4QIsa^{d}	Isaiah	4Q58	Isaiah 46:10–13; 47:1–6,8–9; 48:8–22; 49:1–15; 52:4–7; 53:8–12; 54:1–11; 57:9–21; 58:1–3,5–7	Hebrew	Herodian	Fragments of Isaiah	
4QIsa^{e}	Isaiah	4Q59	Isaiah 2:1–4; 7:17–20; 8:2–14; 9:17–20; 10:1–10; 11:14–15; 12:1–6; 13:1–4; 14:1–13,20–24; 59:15–16	Hebrew	Herodian	Fragments of Isaiah	
4QIsa^{f}	Isaiah	4Q60	Isaiah 1:10–16,18–31; 2:1–3; 5:13–14, 25; 6:3–8,10–13; 7:16–18,23–25; 8:1,4–11; 20:4–6; 22:14–22,25; 24:1–3; 27:1,5–6,8–12; 28:6–9,16–18,22,24; 29:8	Hebrew	Hasmonean	Fragments of Isaiah	
4QIsa^{g}	Isaiah	4Q61	Isaiah 42:14–25; 43:1–4,17–24	Hebrew	Herodian	Fragments of Isaiah	
4QIsa^{h}	Isaiah	4Q61	Isaiah 42:4–11	Hebrew	Herodian	Fragments of Isaiah	
4QIsa^{i}	Isaiah	4Q62	Isaiah 56:7–8; 57:5–8	Hebrew	Hasmonean	Fragments of Isaiah	
4QIsa^{j}	Isaiah	4Q63	Isaiah 1:1–6	Hebrew	Herodian	Fragments of Isaiah	
4QIsa^{k}	Isaiah	4Q64	Isaiah 28:26–29:9	Hebrew	Hasmonean	Fragments of Isaiah	
4QIsa^{l}	Isaiah	4Q65	Isaiah 7:14–15; 8:11–14	Hebrew	Hasmonean	Fragments of Isaiah	
4QIsa^{m}	Isaiah	4Q66	Isaiah 60:20–61:1,3–6	Hebrew	Hasmonean	Fragments of Isaiah	
4QIsa^{n}	Isaiah	4Q67	Isaiah 58:13–14	Hebrew	Hasmonean	Fragments of Isaiah, including elements on punishment (4Q67) and God's blessings for his people (4Q67, 4Q69a).	
4QIsa^{o}	Isaiah	4Q68	Isaiah 14:28–15:2	Hebrew	Hasmonean	Fragments of Isaiah, including elements on punishment (4Q67) and God's blessings for his people (4Q67, 4Q69a).	
4QIsa^{p}	Isaiah	4Q69	Isaiah 5:28–30	Hebrew	Hasmonean	Fragments of Isaiah, including elements on punishment (4Q67) and God's blessings for his people (4Q67, 4Q69a).	
4QIsa^{q}	Isaiah	4Q69a	Isaiah 54:10–13	Hebrew	Hasmonean	Fragments of Isaiah, including elements on punishment (4Q67) and God's blessings for his people (4Q67, 4Q69a).	
4QIsa^{r}	Isaiah	4Q69b	Isaiah 30:23	Hebrew	Hasmonean	Fragments of Isaiah, including elements on punishment (4Q67) and God's blessings for his people (4Q67, 4Q69a).	
4QJer^{a}	Jeremiah	4Q70	Jeremiah 6:30?, 7:1–2, 15–19, 28–9:2, 7–15; 10:9–14, 23; 11:3–6, 19–20; 12:3–7, 13–16, 17; 13:1–7, 22–23? [or 22:3], 27; 14:4–7; 15:1–2; 17:8–26; 18:15–23; 19:1; 20:14–18; 21:1?; 22:3–16; 26:10?	Hebrew	200 BCE – 1 BCE	Fragments of Jeremiah	
4QJer^{b}	Jeremiah	4Q71	Jeremiah 9:22–25; 10:1–21	Hebrew	200 BCE – 1 BCE	Fragments of Jeremiah	
4QJer^{c}	Jeremiah	4Q72	Jeremiah 4:5, 13–16; 8:1–3, 21–23; 9:1–5; 10:12–13; 19:8–9; 20:2–5, 7–9, 13–15; 21:7–10; 22:4–6, 10–28; 25:7–8,15–17, 24–26; 26:10–13; 27:1–3, 13–15; 30:6–9, [10–17], 17–24; 31:1–14, 19–26; 33:?, 16–20	Hebrew	200 BCE – 1 BCE	Fragments of Jeremiah	
4QJer^{d} (olim 4QJer^{b})	Jeremiah	4Q72a	Jeremiah 43:2–10	Hebrew	200 BCE – 1 BCE	Fragments of Jeremiah	
4QJer^{e} (olim 4QJer^{b})	Jeremiah	4Q72b	Jeremiah 50:4–6	Hebrew	200 BCE – 1 BCE	Fragments of Jeremiah	
4QEze^{a}	Ezekiel	4Q73	Ezekiel 10:5–16, 17–22; 11:1–11; 23:14–15, 17–18, 44–47; 41:3–6	Hebrew	Herodian	Fragments of Ezekiel	
4QEze^{b}	Ezekiel	4Q74	Ezekiel 1:10–13, 16–17, 19–24	Hebrew	Herodian	Fragments of Ezekiel	
4QEze^{c}	Ezekiel	4Q75	Ezekiel 24:2–3	Hebrew	Herodian	Fragments of Ezekiel	
4QXII^{a}	The Twelve Minor Prophets	4Q76	Zechariah 14:18; Malachi 2:10–3:24; Jonah 1:1–5, 7–2:1, 7; 3:2	Hebrew	Herodian	Fragments of the Twelve Minor Prophets	
4QXII^{b}	The Twelve Minor Prophets	4Q77	Zephaniah 1:1–2; 2:13–15; 3:19–20; Haggai 1:1–2; 2:2–4	Hebrew	Herodian	Fragments of the Twelve Minor Prophets	
4QXII^{c}	The Twelve Minor Prophets	4Q78	Hosea 2:13–15; 3:2–4; 4:1–19; 5:1; 7:12–13; 13:3–10, 15; 14:1–6; Joel 1:10–20; 2:1, 8–23; 4:6–21; Amos 1:1?; 2:11–16; 3:1–15; 4:1–2; 6:13–14; 7:1–16; Zephaniah 2:15; 3:1–2; Malachi 3:6–7?	Hebrew	Herodian	Fragments of the Twelve Minor Prophets	
4QXII^{d}	The Twelve Minor Prophets	4Q79	Hosea 1:6–2:5	Hebrew	Herodian	Fragments of the Twelve Minor Prophets	
4QXII^{e}	The Twelve Minor Prophets	4Q80	Haggai 2:18–19, 20–21; Zechariah 1:4–6, 8–10, 13–15; 2:10–14; 3:2–10; 4:1–4; 5:8–6:5; 8:2–4, 6–7, 12:7–12	Hebrew	Herodian	Fragments of the Twelve Minor Prophets	
4QXII^{f}	The Twelve Minor Prophets	4Q81	Jonah 1:6–8, 10–16; Micah 5:1–2	Hebrew	Herodian	Fragments of the Twelve Minor Prophets	
4QXII^{g}	The Twelve Minor Prophets	4Q82	Hosea 2:1–5,14–19, 22–25; 3:1–5; 4:1, 10–11, 13–14; 6:3–4, 8–11; 7:1, 12–13, 13–16; 8:1; 9:1–4, 9–17; 10:1–14; 11:2–5, 6–11; 12:1–15; 13:1, 6–8?, 11–13; 14:9–10; Joel 1:12–14; 2:2–13 4:4–9, 11–14, 17, 19–20; Amos 1:3–15; 2:1, 7–9, 15–16; 3:1–2; 4:4–9; 5:1–2, 9–18; 6:1–4, 6–14; 7:1, 7–12, 14–17; 8:1–5, 11–14; 9:1, 5–6, 14–15; Obadiah 1–5, 8–12, 14–15; Jonah 1:1–9; 2:3–11; 3:1–3; 4:5–11; Micah 1:7, 12–15; 2:3–4; 3:12; 4:1–2; 5:6–7 (7–8); 7:2–3, 20; Nahum 1:7–9; 2:9–11; 3:1–3, 17; Habakkuk 2:4?; Zephaniah 3:3–5; Zechariah 10:11–12; 11:1–2; 12:1–3	Hebrew	Herodian	Fragments of the Twelve Minor Prophets	
4QPs^{a}	Psalms	4Q83	Psalm 5:9–13; 6:1–4; 25:15; 31:24–25; 33:1–12; 35:2,14–20,26–28; 36:1–9; 38:2–12,16–23; 47:2; 53:4–7; 54:1–6; 56:4; 62:13; 63:2–4; 66:16–20; 67:1–7; 69:1–19; 71:1–14	Hebrew	Hasmonean	Fragments of Psalms.	
4QPs^{b}	Psalms	4Q84	Psalm 91:5–8,12–15; 92:4–8,13–15; 93:5; 94:1–4,8–14,17–18,21–22; 96:2; 98:4; 99:5–6; 100:1–2; 102:5,10–29; 103:1–6,9–14,20–21; 112:4–5; 113:1; 115:2–3; 116:17–19; 118:1–3,6–11,18–20,23–26,29	Hebrew	Herodian	Fragments of Psalms.	
4QPs^{c} & 4QPs^{t} (Note: In 2022, D. Longacre and B. Strawn demonstrated this small fragment to be part of the larger manuscript 4QPs^{c}, as opposed to a separate manuscript of the Psalms.)	Psalms	4Q85 / 4Q98^{c}	Psalm 16:7–9; 18:3–14,16–18,33–41; 27:12–14; 28:1–2,4; 35:27–28; 37:18–19; 45:8–11; 49:1–17; 50:14–23; 51:1–5; 52:6–11; 53:1 Psalm 88:15–17	Hebrew	Herodian	Fragments of Psalms.	
4QPs^{d}	Psalms	4Q86	Psalm 146:10; 147:1–3,13–17,20; 104:1–5,8–11,14–15,22–25,33–35	Hebrew	Hasmonean	Fragments of Psalms.	
4QPs^{e}	Psalms	4Q87	Psalm 76:10–12; 77:1; 78:6–7,31–33; 81:2–3; 86:10–11; 88:1–4; 89:44–46,50–53; 104:1–3,20–21; 105:22–24,36–45; 109:13; 115:15–18; 116:1–3; 120:6; 125:2–5; 126:1–5; 129:8; 130:1–3	Hebrew	Herodian	Fragments of Psalms.	
4QPs^{f}	Psalms	4Q88	Psalm 22:14–17; 107:2–4,8–11,13–15,18–19,22–30,35; 109:4–6, 25–28; Apostrophe to Zion; Apostrophe to Judah; Eschatological Hymn	Hebrew	Hasmonean	Fragments of Psalms.	
4QPs^{g}	Psalms	4Q89	Psalm 119:37–43,44–46,49–50,73,81–83,90	Hebrew	Herodian	Fragments of Psalms.	
4QPs^{h}	Psalms	4Q90	Psalm 119:10–21	Hebrew	Herodian	Fragments of Psalms.	
4QPs^{j}	Psalms	4Q91	Psalm 48:1–7; 49:6,9–12,15,17	Hebrew	Herodian	Fragments of Psalms.	
4QPs^{k}	Psalms	4Q92	Psalm 26:7–12; 27:1; 30:9–13; 135:7–16;	Hebrew	Hasmonean	Fragments of Psalms.	
4QPs^{l}	Psalms	4Q93	Psalm 104:3–5,11–12	Hebrew	Herodian	Fragments of Psalms.	
4QPs^{m}	Psalms	4Q94	Psalm 93:3–5; 95:3–6; 97:6–9; 98:4–8	Hebrew	Herodian	Fragments of Psalms.	
4QPs^{n}	Psalms	4Q95	Psalm 135:6–9,11–12; 136:23–24	Hebrew	Herodian	Fragments of Psalms.	
4QPs^{o}	Psalms	4Q96	Psalm 114:7; 115:1–2,4; 116:3, 5, 7–10	Hebrew	Herodian	Fragments of Psalms.	
4QPs^{p} (olim 4Q237)	Psalms	4Q97	Psalm 143:2–4, 6–8	Hebrew	Herodian	Fragments of Psalms.	
4QPs^{q}	Psalms	4Q98	Psalm 31:24–25; 33:1–18; 35:4–20	Hebrew	Herodian	Fragments of Psalms, including elements on putting one's hope in God (4Q98d), the earth shaking at the presence of God (4Q98e), the blessings of God's Children and the struggle of the wicked (4Q98f).	
4QPs^{r}	Psalms	4Q98a	Psalm 26:7–12; 27:1; 30:9–13	Hebrew	Herodian	Fragments of Psalms, including elements on putting one's hope in God (4Q98d), the earth shaking at the presence of God (4Q98e), the blessings of God's Children and the struggle of the wicked (4Q98f).	
4QPs^{s}	Psalms	4Q98b	Psalm 5:8–13; 6:1	Hebrew	Herodian	Fragments of Psalms, including elements on putting one's hope in God (4Q98d), the earth shaking at the presence of God (4Q98e), the blessings of God's Children and the struggle of the wicked (4Q98f).	
*4QPs^{t} (see 4QPs^{c})	Psalms	*4Q98c	Psalm 88:15–17	Hebrew	Herodian	Fragments of Psalms, including elements on putting one's hope in God (4Q98d), the earth shaking at the presence of God (4Q98e), the blessings of God's Children and the struggle of the wicked (4Q98f).	
4QPs^{u}	Psalms	4Q98d	Psalm 42:5	Hebrew	Herodian	Fragments of Psalms, including elements on putting one's hope in God (4Q98d), the earth shaking at the presence of God (4Q98e), the blessings of God's Children and the struggle of the wicked (4Q98f).	
4QPs^{v} (olim 4QPs^{u} frg. 2)	Psalms	4Q98e	Psalm 99:1	Hebrew	Herodian	Fragments of Psalms, including elements on putting one's hope in God (4Q98d), the earth shaking at the presence of God (4Q98e), the blessings of God's Children and the struggle of the wicked (4Q98f).	
4QPs^{w}	Psalms	4Q98f	Psalm 112:1–9	Hebrew	Herodian	Fragments of Psalms, including elements on putting one's hope in God (4Q98d), the earth shaking at the presence of God (4Q98e), the blessings of God's Children and the struggle of the wicked (4Q98f).	
4QPs^{x} (olim 4Q236)	Psalms	4Q98g	Psalm 89:20–22, 26, 23, 27–28, 31	Hebrew	Herodian	Fragments of Psalms, including elements on putting one's hope in God (4Q98d), the earth shaking at the presence of God (4Q98e), the blessings of God's Children and the struggle of the wicked (4Q98f).	
4QJob^{a}	Job	4Q99	Job 31:14–19; 32:3–4; 33:10–11, 24–26, 28–30; 35:16; 36:7–11, 13–27, 32–33; 37:1–5, 14–15	Hebrew	Hasmonean	Fragments of Job	
4QJob^{b}	Job	4Q100	Job 8:15–17; 9:27; 13:4; 14:4–6; 31:20–21	Hebrew	Herodian	Fragments of Job	

=== 4Q101–4Q200 ===
Fragment or scroll identifier	Fragment or scroll name	Alternative identifier	English Bible Association	Language	Date/script	Description	Reference
4QpaleoJob^{c}	Paleo-Job	4Q101	Job 13:18–20, 23–27; 14:13–18	Hebrew	Early Hellenistic; Paleo-Hebrew script	Fragment of Job	
4QProv^{a}	Proverbs	4Q102	Proverbs 1:27–33; 2:1	Hebrew	Herodian	Fragments of Proverbs	
4QProv^{b}	Proverbs	4Q103	Proverbs 13:6–9; 14:5–10, 12–13, 31–35; 15:1–8, 19–31; 7:9, 11?	Hebrew	Herodian	Fragments of Proverbs	
4QRuth^{a}	Ruth	4Q104	Ruth 1:1–12	Hebrew	Hasmonean	Fragments of Ruth	
4QRuth^{b}	Ruth	4Q105	Ruth 1:1–6, 12–15	Hebrew	Herodian	Fragments of Ruth	
4QCant^{a}	Canticles (Song of Songs)	4Q106	Song of Songs 3:4–5, 7–11; 4:1–7; 6:11?–12; 7:1–7	Hebrew	Herodian	Fragments of Pesher on Song of Songs/Canticles, including an introduction (4Q106).	
4QCant^{b}	Canticles (Song of Songs)	4Q107	Song of Songs 2:9–17; 3:1–2, 5, 9–11; 4:1–3, 8–11, 14–16; 5:1	Hebrew	Herodian	Fragments of Pesher on Song of Songs/Canticles, including an introduction (4Q106).	
4QCant^{c}	Canticles (Song of Songs)	4Q108	Song of Songs 3:7–8	Hebrew	Hellenistic-Roman	Fragments of Pesher on Song of Songs/Canticles, including an introduction (4Q106).	
4QQoh^{a}	Ecclesiastes	4Q109	Ecclesiastes 5:13–17; 6:1?,3–8,12; 7:1–10,19–20	Hebrew	Hasmonean	Fragments of Ecclesiastes	
4QQoh^{b}	Ecclesiastes	4Q110	Ecclesiastes 1:10–15	Hebrew	Herodian	Fragments of Ecclesiastes	
4QLam	Lamentations	4Q111	Lamentations 1:1–15, 17, 16, 18; 2:5	Hebrew	Herodian	Fragments of Lamentations	
4QDan^{a}	Daniel	4Q112	Daniel 1:16–20; 2:9–11, 19–49; 3:1–2; 4:29–30; 5:5–7, 12–14, 16–19; 7:5–7, 25–28; 8:1–5; 10:16–20; 11:13–16	Hebrew	Hasmonean	Fragments of Daniel	
4QDan^{b}	Daniel	4Q113	Daniel 5:10–12, 14–16, 19–22; 6:8–22, 27–29; 7:1–6, 11?, 26–28; 8:1–8, 13–16	Hebrew	Herodian	Fragments of Daniel	
4QDan^{c}	Daniel	4Q114	Daniel 10:5–9, 11–16, 21; 11:1–2, 13–17, 25–29	Hebrew	Hasmonean	Fragments of Daniel	
4QDan^{d}	Daniel	4Q115	Daniel 3:8–10?, 23–25; 4:5–9, 12–16; 7:15–23	Hebrew	Herodian	Fragments of Daniel	
4QDan^{e}	Daniel	4Q116	Daniel 9:12–17	Hebrew	Hasmonean	Fragments of Daniel	
4QEzra	Ezra	4Q117	Ezra 4:2–6, 9–11; 5:17; 6:1–5	Hebrew	Hasmonean	Fragments of Ezra-Nehemiah	
4QChr/4QChron	Chronicles	4Q118	2 Chronicles 28:27; 29:1–3	Hebrew	Herodian	Fragments of 2 Chronicles	
4QLXXLev^{a} gr	Septuagint Leviticus	4Q119	Leviticus 26:2–16	Greek	Hasmonean	Fragments of Leviticus	
4QpapLXXLev^{b}/ pap4QLXXLev^{b} gr	Septuagint Leviticus	4Q120	Leviticus 1:11; 2:3–5, 7–8?; 3:4, 7, 9–14; 4:3–4, 6–8, 10–11, 18–19, 26–28, 30; 5:6, 8–10, 16–24; [6:1–5]	Greek	Hasmonean	97 fragments of Leviticus. Contains ΙΑΩ for the tetragrammaton	
4QLXXNum^{b} gr	Septuagint Numbers	4Q121	Numbers 3:40–43,50–51?; 4:1?,5–9,11–16; 3:39?	Greek	Herodian	Fragments of Numbers	
4QLXXDeut gr	Septuagint Deuteronomy	4Q122	Deuteronomy 11:4	Greek	Early Hellenistic	Fragments of Deuteronomy	
4QpaleoparaJosh	Paraphrase on Joshua	4Q123	Joshua	Hebrew	Paleo-Hebrew script	"Rewritten Joshua"	
4QUnid gr	Unidentified text	4Q126	—	Greek	Herodian	Fragmentary religious text	
4Qpap paraExod / pap4QParaExod gr	Paraphrase on Exodus	4Q127	Exodus	Greek	Herodian	"Rewritten Exodus"	
4Qphyl^{a}	Phylactery Scrolls	4Q128	Deuteronomy 5:1–14,27–6:3; 10:12–11:21; Exodus 12:43–13:7	Hebrew	Hellenistic-Roman	Fragments of Deuteronomy and Exodus.	
4Qphyl^{b}	Phylactery Scrolls	4Q129	Exodus 13:9–16	Hebrew	Hellenistic-Roman	Fragments of Deuteronomy and Exodus.	
4Qphyl^{c}	Phylactery Scrolls	4Q130	Exodus 13:13–16; Deuteronomy 6:4–9; 11:13–21	Hebrew	Hellenistic-Roman	Fragments of Deuteronomy and Exodus.	
4Qphyl^{d}	Phylactery Scrolls	4Q131	Deuteronomy 11:13–21	Hebrew	Hellenistic-Roman	Fragments of Deuteronomy and Exodus.	
4Qphyl^{e}	Phylactery Scrolls	4Q132	Exodus 13:1–10	Hebrew	Hellenistic-Roman	Fragments of Deuteronomy and Exodus.	
4Qphyl^{f}	Phylactery Scrolls	4Q133	Exodus 13:11–16	Hebrew	Hellenistic-Roman	Fragments of Deuteronomy and Exodus.	
4Qphyl^{g}	Phylactery Scrolls	4Q134	Deuteronomy 5:1–21; Exodus 13:11–12	Hebrew	Hellenistic-Roman	Fragments of Deuteronomy and Exodus.	
4Qphyl^{h}	Phylactery Scrolls	4Q135	Deuteronomy 5:22–6:5; Exodus 13:14–16	Hebrew	Hellenistic-Roman	Fragments of Deuteronomy and Exodus.	
4Qphyl^{i}	Phylactery Scrolls	4Q136	Deuteronomy 6:6–7; 11:13–21; Exodus 12:43–13:10	Hebrew	Hellenistic-Roman	Fragments of Deuteronomy and Exodus.	
4Qphyl^{j} (olim 4Qphyl^{a})	Phylactery Scrolls	4Q137	Deuteronomy 5:24–32; 6:2–3	Hebrew		Fragments of Deuteronomy and Exodus.	
4Qphyl^{k}	Phylactery Scrolls	4Q138	Deuteronomy 10:12–11:17	Hebrew	Hellenistic-Roman	Fragments of Deuteronomy and Exodus.	
4Qphyl^{l}	Phylactery Scrolls	4Q139	Deuteronomy 5:7–24	Hebrew	Hellenistic-Roman	Fragments of Deuteronomy and Exodus.	
4Qphyl^{m}	Phylactery Scrolls	4Q140	Exodus 12:44–13:10; Deuteronomy 5:33–6:5	Hebrew	Hellenistic-Roman	Fragments of Deuteronomy and Exodus.	
4Qphyl^{n}	Phylactery Scrolls	4Q141	Deuteronomy 32:14–20, 32–33	Hebrew	Hellenistic-Roman	Fragments of Deuteronomy and Exodus.	
4Qphyl^{o}	Phylactery Scrolls	4Q142	Deuteronomy 5:1–16, 6:7–9	Hebrew	Hellenistic-Roman	Fragments of Deuteronomy and Exodus.	
4Qphyl^{p}	Phylactery Scrolls	4Q143	Deuteronomy 10:22–11:3,18–21	Hebrew	Hellenistic-Roman	Fragments of Deuteronomy and Exodus.	
4Qphyl^{q}	Phylactery Scrolls	4Q144	Exodus 13:4–9; Deuteronomy 11:4–18	Hebrew	Hellenistic-Roman	Fragments of Deuteronomy and Exodus.	
4Qphyl^{r}	Phylactery Scrolls	4Q145	Exodus 13:1–10	Hebrew	Hellenistic-Roman	Fragments of Deuteronomy and Exodus.	
4QPhyl^{s}	Phylactery Scrolls	4Q146	Deuteronomy 11:19–21	Hebrew	Hellenistic-Roman	Fragments of Deuteronomy and Exodus.	
4Qphyl^{t}	Phylactery Scrolls	4Q147		Hebrew	Hellenistic-Roman	Could not be deciphered	
4Qphyl^{u}	Phylactery Scrolls	4Q148		Hebrew	Hellenistic-Roman	Could not be deciphered	
4QMez^{a}	Mezuzah Scrolls	4Q149		Hebrew	Hasmonean	Fragments of Exodus and Deuteronomy	
4QMez^{b}	Mezuzah Scrolls	4Q150	Deuteronomy 6:5–6; 10:14–11:2	Hebrew	Herodian	Fragments of Exodus and Deuteronomy	
4QMez^{c}	Mezuzah Scrolls	4Q151	Deuteronomy 5:27–6:9; 10:12–20	Hebrew	Herodian	Fragments of Exodus and Deuteronomy	
4QMez^{d}	Mezuzah Scrolls	4Q152	Deuteronomy 6:5–7	Hebrew	Herodian	Fragments of Exodus and Deuteronomy	
4QMez^{e}	Mezuzah Scrolls	4Q153	Deuteronomy 11:17–18	Hebrew	Hellenistic-Roman	Fragments of Exodus and Deuteronomy	
4QMez^{f}	Mezuzah Scrolls	4Q154	Deuteronomy 13:1–4	Hebrew	Hasmonean	Fragments of Exodus and Deuteronomy	
4QMez^{g}	Mezuzah Scrolls	4Q155		Hebrew	Hellenistic-Roman	Fragments of Exodus and Deuteronomy	
4QtgLev	Targum of Leviticus	4Q156	Leviticus 16:12–15,18–21	Aramaic	Hasmonean	Fragments of Leviticus	
4QtgJob	Targum of Job	4Q157	Job 3:5–6; 4:17–5:4	Aramaic	Herodian	Fragments of Job	
4QRP^{a}	Reworked Pentateuch A	4Q158	Genesis 32:25–30; 32:31 ?; Exodus 3:12; 4:27–28; 19:17–23; 24:4–6; 20:12–17,19–21 (Samaritan), 22–26; 21:15–25, 32–37; 22:1–13; 30:32.34; Deuteronomy 5:30–31; 21:1–10	Hebrew	Herodian	Reworked Pentateuch	
4QOrdinances^{a}	Ordinances A	4Q159		Hebrew	Herodian	Non-biblical composition	
4QVisSam	Vision of Samuel	4Q160		Hebrew	Hasmonean	Non-biblical composition	
4QpIsaiah^{a}	Pesher on Isaiah	4Q161		Hebrew	Herodian	Non-biblical composition	
4QpIsaiah^{b}	Pesher on Isaiah	4Q162		Hebrew	Herodian	Non-biblical composition	
4QpHosA	Pesher on Hosea A	4Q166		Hebrew	Herodian	Hosea Commentary Scroll	
4QpHosB	Pesher on Hosea B	4Q167		Hebrew	Herodian	Hosea Commentary Scroll	
4QpMic(?)	Pesher on Micah?	4Q168		Hebrew	Herodian	Micah Commentary?	
4QpNah	Pesher on Nahum	4Q169	Nahum 1:3–6; 2:12–14; 3:1–5, 6–9, 10–12, 14	Hebrew	Herodian	Containing the term "The Seekers after Smooth Things"	
4Q Eschatological Commentary A	Florilegium or Midrash on the Last Days	4Q174	2 Samuel 7:10–14 (1 Chronicles 17:9–13); Exodus 15:17–18; Amos 9:11; Psalm 1:1; Isaiah 8:11; Ezekiel 37:23?; Psalm 2:1; Daniel 12:10; 11:32; Deuteronomy 33:8–11, 12, 19–21	Hebrew	Herodian	Quotations from biblical passages with midrashic commentary	
4QTest	Testimonia	4Q175	Deuteronomy 5:28–29; 18:18–19; 33:8–11 Numbers 24:15–17 Joshua 6:26, quoted in Psalms of Joshua (4Q379, frag. 22)	Hebrew	Herodian; Hasmonean script	A list of quotations; Messianic Anthology or Testimonia	
4QapocrLamA	Apocryphal Lamentations A	4Q179	Lamentations	Hebrew	Herodian	cf. 4Q501	
4Q Horoscope	Physiognomies/Horoscopes	4Q186		Hebrew	Herodian		
4QpapTobit^{a}	Tobit	4Q196	Tobit	Aramaic	Hasmonean	On Papyrus. cf. 4Q501	
4QTobit^{b}	Tobit	4Q197	Tobit	Aramaic	Herodian	cf. 4Q501	
4QTobit^{c}	Tobit	4Q198	Tobit	Aramaic	Hasmonean	cf. 4Q501	
4QTobit^{d}	Tobit	4Q199	Tobit	Aramaic	Hasmonean	cf. 4Q501	
4QTobit^{e}	Tobit	4Q200	Tobit	Hebrew	Herodian	cf. 4Q501	

=== 4Q201–4Q300 ===
Fragment or scroll identifier	Fragment or scroll name	Alternative identifier	English Bible Association	Language	Date/script	Description	Reference
4QEn^{a}	The Enoch Scroll	4Q201^{a}		Aramaic	Hasmonean		
4QALD / 4QLevi^{a-f} ar	The Aramaic Levi Document (ALD)	4Q213 4Q213a 4Q213b 4Q214 4Q214a 4Q214b		Aramaic	Hasmonean	Multiple compositions	
4QTNaph	Testament of Naphtali	4Q215		Hebrew	Herodian		
4QCant^{a}(?)	Pesher on Canticles/Song of Songs	4Q240	Song of Songs	Hebrew	Herodian	Included in Milik's original list, but this fragment has never been located	
4QapocrDan	Aramaic Apocalypse or The Son of God Text	4Q246		Aramaic	Herodian		
4QCommentary on Gen A /4QCommGenA	Commentary/Pesher on Genesis	4Q252	Genesis 6:3; 7:10–8:18; 9:24–27; 11:31; 15:9, 17, 17:20?; 18:31–32 (with Deuteronomy 13:16, 17; 20:11, 14); 22:10–12; 28:3–4; 36:12; 49:3–4, 10 (with Jeremiah 33:17), 20–21	Hebrew	Herodian	Fragments/ commentary of Genesis.	
4QCommentary on Gen B /4QCommGenB	Commentary/Pesher on Genesis	4Q253	Genesis	Hebrew	Herodian	Fragments/ commentary of Genesis.	
4QCommentary on Gen C /4QCommGenC	Commentary/Pesher on Genesis	4Q254	Genesis 9:24–25; 22:5?, 17?	Hebrew	Herodian	Fragments/ commentary of Genesis.	
4QCommentary on Gen D (olim 4QpGen^{c})	Commentary/Pesher on Genesis	4Q254^{a}–820	Genesis 6:15	Hebrew	Herodian	Fragments/ commentary of Genesis.	
4QS^{d}	Serekh ha-Yahad or Community Rule	4Q258		Hebrew	Herodian	cf. 1QS^{d}	
4QD	The Damascus Document	4Q265–273		Hebrew	Hasmonean	cf. 4QD^{a/g} = 4Q266/272, 4QD^{a/e} = 4Q266/270, 5Q12, 6Q15, 4Q265–73	
4Q Sefer ha-Milhamah	Rule of War	4Q285		Hebrew	Herodian	cf. 11Q14	
4QMyst^{a}	The Book of Mysteries; The Book of Secrets	4Q299		Hebrew	Herodian		
4QMyst^{b}	The Book of Mysteries; The Book of Secrets	4Q300		Hebrew	Herodian		

=== 4Q301– ===
Fragment or scroll identifier	Fragment or scroll name	Alternative identifier	English Bible Association	Language	Date/script	Description	Reference
4QMyst^{c}	The Book of Mysteries; The Book of Secrets	4Q301		Hebrew	Herodian		
4QRP^{b}	Reworked Pentateuch	4Q364	Genesis 25:18–21; 26:7–8; 27:39; 28:6; 29:32–33; 30:8–14,26–36; 31:47–53; 32:18–20,26–30; 34:2; 35:28; 37:7–8; 38:14–21; 44:30–34; 45:1,21–27; 48:14–15; Exodus 21:14–22; 19:17; 24:12–14,18; 25:1–2; 26:1,33–35; Numbers 14:16–20; 33:31–49; 20:17–18; Deuteronomy 2:8–14, 30–37; 3:2,18–23; 9:6–7,12–18, 21–25,27–29; 10:1–4, 6–7, 10–13,22; 11:1–2,6–9,23–24; 14:24–26	Hebrew	Late Hasmonean or Herodian	Reworked Pentateuch	
4QRP^{c}	Reworked Pentateuch	4Q365	Exodus 8:13–19; 9:9–12; 10:19–20; 14:10,12–21; 15:6-[21],22–26; 17:3–5; 18:13–16; 26:34–36; 28:16–20; 29:20–22; 30:27–38; 31:1–2; 35:[2]–5; 36:32–38; 37:29; 38:1–7; 39:1–19; Leviticus 11:1[3],17-[25],32-[33],[39]-[46]; 13:6–8,15-[19],51–52; 16:6–7; 18:[25]-[29]; 23:42–44; 24:1–2; 25:7–9; 26:17–32; 27:34; Numbers 1:1–5; 3:26–30; 4:47–49; 7:1,78–80; 8:11–12; 9:15–23; 10:1-[4]; 13:[11]–25,[28]–30; 15:26-[29]; 17:20–24; 27:11; 36:1–2; Deuteronomy 2:24; 19:20–21; 20:1	Hebrew	Late Hasmonean/ Early Herodian	Reworked Pentateuch	
4QRP^{d}	Reworked Pentateuch	4Q366	Exodus 21;35–37; 22:1–5; Leviticus 24:20–22; 25:39–43; Numbers 29:14-[25], 32–39; 30:1; Deuteronomy 16:13–14; 14:[13]–21	Hebrew	Herodian	Reworked Pentateuch	
4QRP^{e}	Reworked Pentateuch	4Q367	Leviticus 11:47; 12:1–8; 13:1; 15:14–15; 19:1–4,9–15; 20:13; 27:30–34	Hebrew	Hasmonean	Reworked Pentateuch	
4QapocrJosh^{a}	Apocryphon of Joshua	4Q378		Hebrew	Herodian	Texts drawing on the content of Joshua, Exodus and Numbers.	
4QapocrJosh^{b}	Apocryphon of Joshua	4Q379		Hebrew	Hasmonean	Texts drawing on the content of Joshua, Exodus and Numbers.	
4QpsEzek	Pseudo-Ezekiel	4Q385; 4Q385b; 4Q385c; 4Q386; 4Q388; 4Q391		Hebrew	Herodian		
4QMMT /4Q Cal.Doc.D	Miqsat Ma'ase Ha-Torah or Some Precepts of the Law or the Halakhic Letter	4Q394–399		Hebrew	Herodian		
4Q Non-Canonical Psalms A	Songs of Sabbath Sacrifice or the Angelic Liturgy	4Q400–407		Hebrew	Hasmonean	cf. 11Q5–6	
4QInstruction	Sapiential Work A	4Q415–418		Hebrew	Herodian		
4QParaphrase	Paraphrase of Genesis and Exodus	4Q415–418		Hebrew	Herodian		
4Q Barkhi Nafshi^{a}	Barkhi Nafshi – Apocryphal Psalms	4Q434		Hebrew	Herodian	15 fragments: likely hymns of thanksgiving praising God for his power and expressing thanks	
4Q Apocr. Psalm and Prayer	Hymn to King Jonathan or The Prayer For King Jonathan Scroll	4Q448	Psalms 154	Hebrew	Hasmonean	In addition to parts of Psalms 154 it contains a prayer mentioning "King Jonathan".	
4QpapGen or papJub	pap-Genesis or pap-Jubilees	4Q483	Genesis 1:28–29, or Book of Jubilees	Hebrew	Herodian		
4QShir^{a-b}	Songs of the Sage or Songs of the Maskil	4Q510–511		Hebrew	Herodian		
4Q Messianic Apocalypse	Messianic Apocalypse	4Q521		Hebrew	Hasmonean	Made up of two fragments	
4Q Jonathan		4Q523		Hebrew	Hasmonean	MeKleine Fragmente, z.T. gesetzlichen Inhalts; Fragment is legal in content. PAM number, 41.944	
4QTempleScroll^{b}	Temple Scroll	4Q524		Hebrew	Hasmonean		
4QBeatitudes		4Q525	Sirach 25:10; Matthew 5:3 –12 (Beatitudes)	Hebrew	Herodian		
4Q TJoseph	Testament of Joseph	4Q539		Aramaic	Hasmonean		
4QapocrLevi(?)^{b}	Testament of Levi^{d}	4Q541		Aramaic	Hasmonean	Aramaic frag. also called "4QApocryphon of Levi^{b} ar"	
4QTKohath (4QTQahat)	Testament of Qahat	4Q542		Aramaic	Hasmonean		
4QNJ^{c}	New Jerusalem	4Q555		Aramaic	Herodian	cf. 1Q32, 2Q24, 5Q15, 11Q18	
4QGen^{n}	Genesis	4Q576	Genesis 34:7–10; 50:3	Hebrew	Hasmonean		
Unnumbered				Hebrew		Nine unopened fragments recently rediscovered in storage	

== Gallery ==
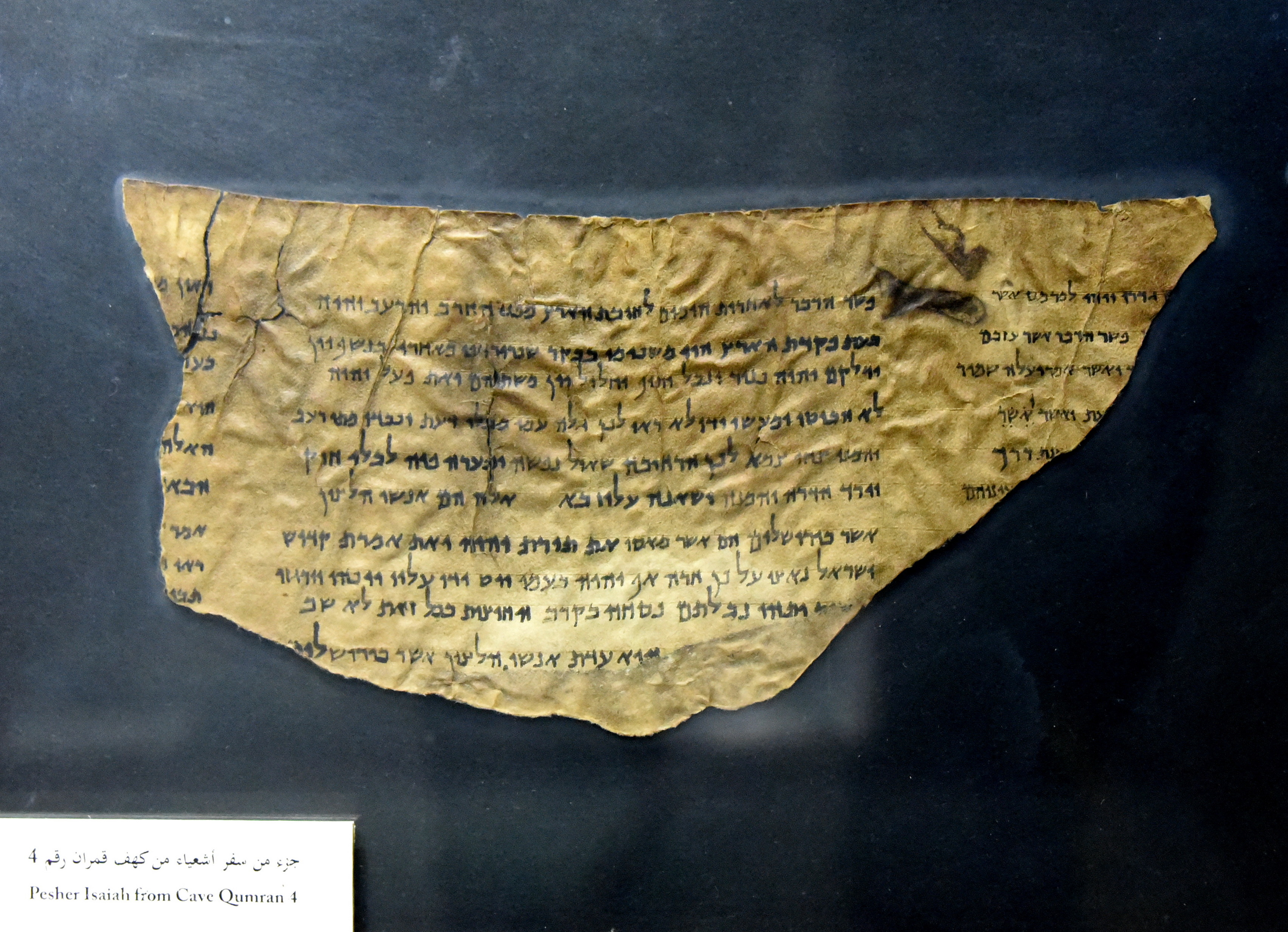
Dead Sea Scroll, Pesher Isaiah, from Qumran Cave 4. The Jordan Museum, Amman

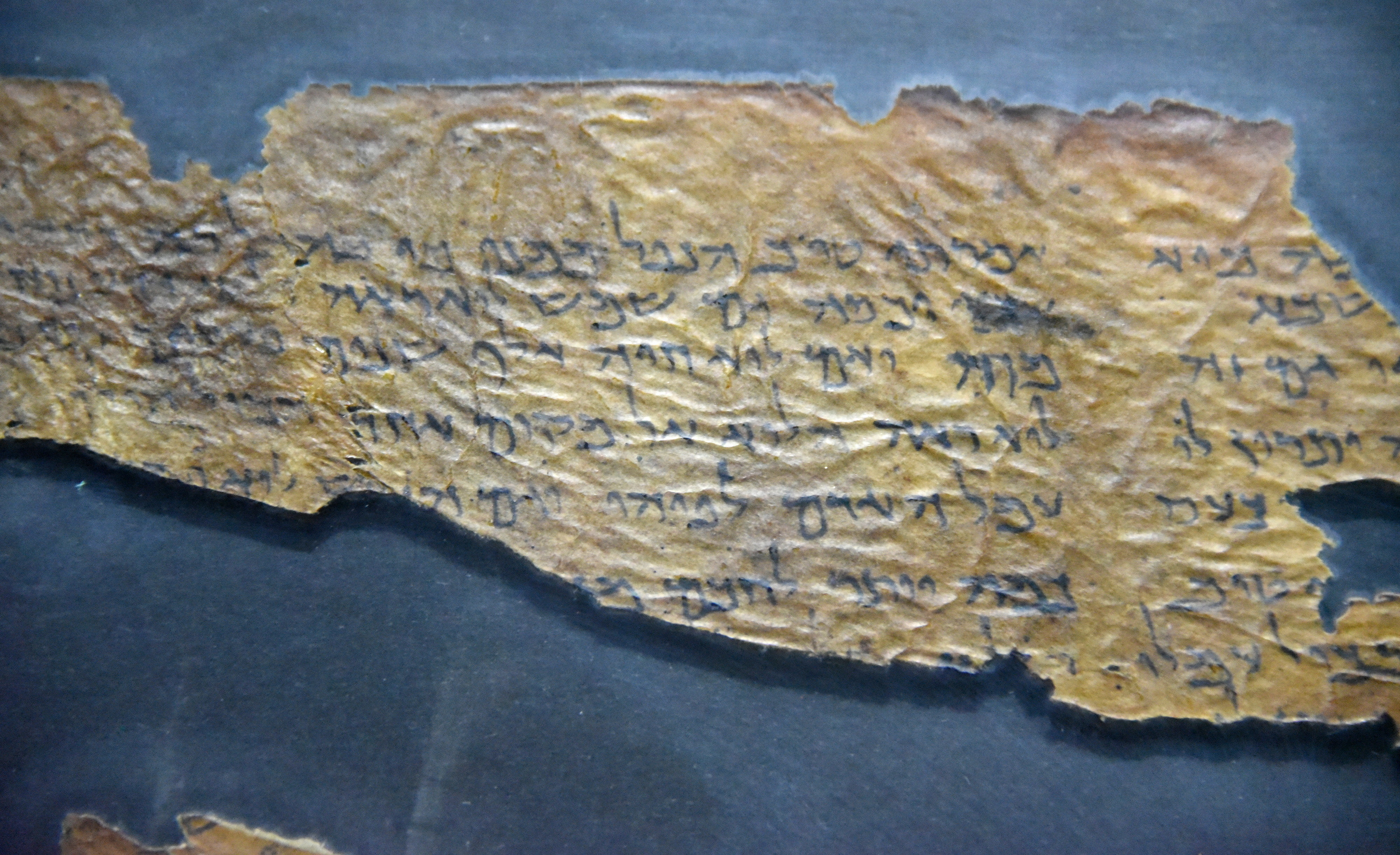
Dead Sea Scroll 109, Qohelet or Ecclesiastes, from Qumran Cave 4. The Jordan Museum, Amman

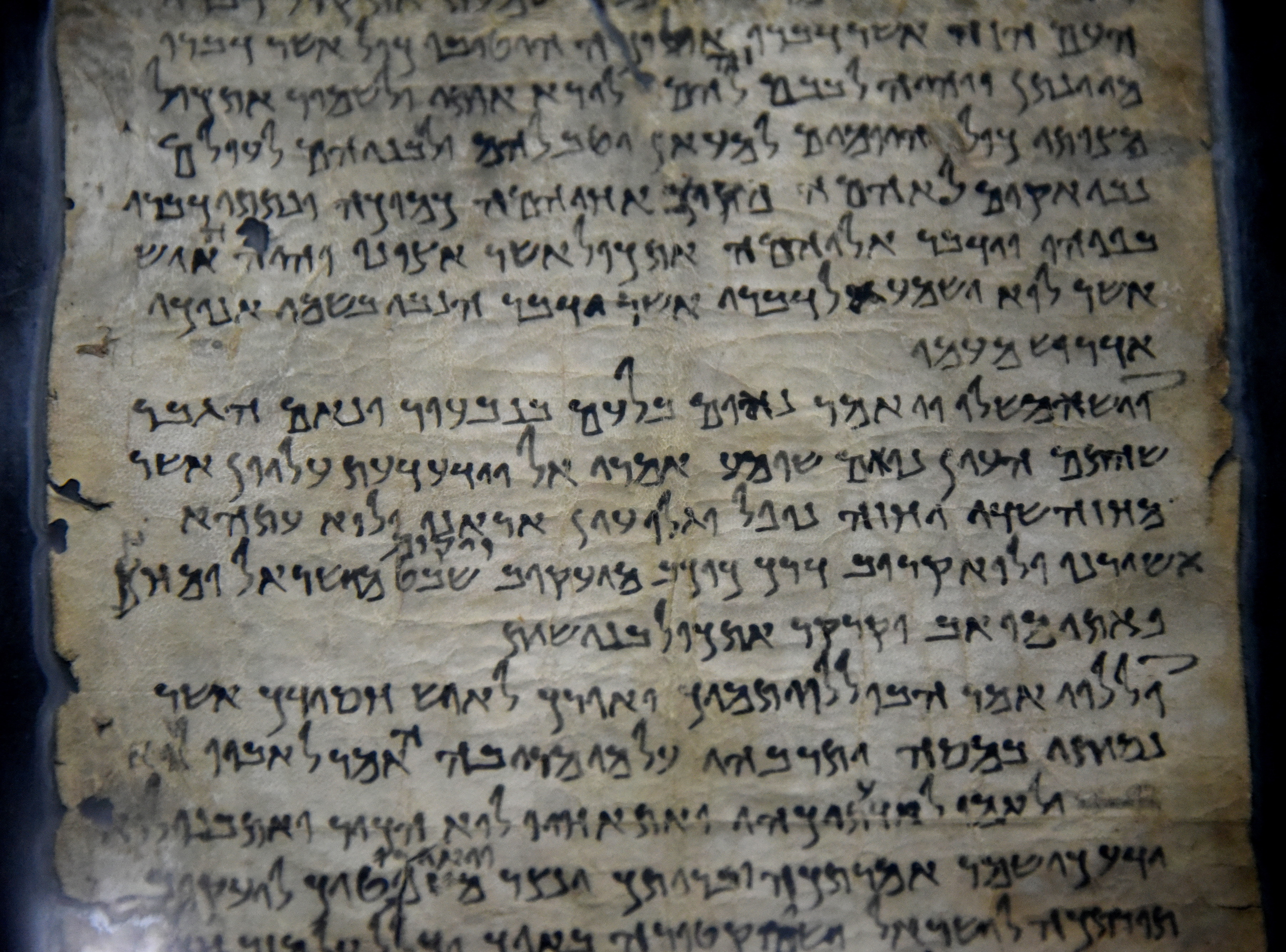
Dead Sea Scroll 175, Testimonia, from Qumran Cave 4. The Jordan Museum, Amman

== See also ==
- Biblical manuscripts
- Septuagint manuscripts
- List of Hebrew Bible manuscripts

== Bibliography ==
- Fitzmyer, Joseph A. (2008). A Guide to the Dead Sea Scrolls and Related Literature. Grand Rapids, MI: William B. Eerdmans Publishing Company. ISBN 9780802862419.
