= 4Q521 =

One of the Dead Sea scrolls

4Q521, or the Messianic Apocalypse, is a fragmentary Hebrew text that consists of two fragments, each with multiple columns. It was found in Cave 4 at Qumran and is included among the Dead Sea Scrolls.

== Text ==
This translation was done by Gaye Strathearn in 2011.

=== Column II, Fragment II ===
[for the heav]ens and the earth will obey his Messiah,
[and all] that is in them will not turn away from the commandments of the holy ones.
Be encouraged, you who are seeking the Lord in his service!
Will you not, perhaps, encounter the Lord in it, all those who hope in their heart?
For the Lord will observe the devout, and call the just by name,
and upon the poor he will place his spirit, and the faithful he will renew with his strength.
For he will honor the devout upon the throne of an eternal royalty,
freeing prisoners, giving sight to the blind, straightening out the twisted.
Ever shall I cling to those who hope. In his mercy he will jud[ge,]
and from no one shall the fruit [of] good [deeds] be delayed,
and the Lord will perform marvelous acts such as have not existed, just as he sa[id]
for he will heal the badly wounded and he will make the dead live, he will proclaim good news to the poor
give lavishly [to the need]y, lead the exiled and enrich the hungry.
[. . .] and all [. . .]

=== Column III, Fragment II ===
and the law of your favor. And I will free them with [. . .]
[. . .] the fathers toward the sons [. . .]
who blesses the Lord in his approval [. . .]
May the earth rejoice in all the places [. . .]
for all Israel in the rejoicing of [. . .]
and his scepter [. . .]

== Analysis of the Second Fragment ==
=== Topic and content ===
This fragment is primarily eschatological and concerns the ministry of an Anointed. It is similar to other apocalyptic texts such as 4QSecond Ezekiel and 4QApocryphon of Daniel, though its references to all things obeying the Messiah are not paralleled in any other text in the context of Second Temple Judaism; such references have led to speculation concerning some kind of heavenly status of the Messiah in this text. Some see them as an allusion to Isaiah 1:2, which reads: "Hear, O heavens, and listen, O earth, for the Lᴏʀᴅ has spoken..." However, the heavens and the earth are also commanded to listen to Moses in the Song of Moses, which may preclude any conclusions about a heavenly status of the Messiah. In the Deuterocanon, Elijah commanding the heavens by the power of Yahweh can be identified as a partial parallel: "By the word of the Lord he shut up the heavens and also three times brought down fire" (Sirach 48:3).

There is also some dispute among scholars as to whether "anointed ones" as a defective plural should be rendered as opposed to translating "anointed one." This would form a parallelism with "holy ones" in Line 1 and would imply that the entire line is referring to angelic figures broadly rather than a Messiah specifically. Otherwise, if the singular reading is accepted, this figure is understood to be prophetic rather than a Davidic messiah-king. In the Dead Sea Scrolls, prophets such as Elijah are regularly referred to as "anointed ones"; proclamation (Line 12) is also more characteristic of a messenger or prophet.

=== Similarity with Luke ===
This manuscript has been studied in relation to Song of Mary and Song of Zechariah in the Gospel of Luke. There is a striking similarity between Luke 7:22 and Line 12 of this fragment, particularly concerning the good news being brought to the poor and the resurrection of the dead.

... Go and tell John what you have seen and heard: the blind receive their sight; the lame walk; those with a skin disease are cleansed; the deaf hear; the dead are raised; the poor have good news brought to them.

— Luke 7:22.

... he will heal the badly wounded and he will make the dead live, he will proclaim good news to the poor

— 4Q521, Fragment 2, Column 2, Line 12.

=== Reference to Malachi ===
The third column seems to reference Malachi 4:6 when it says "the fathers toward the sons", though it may be too fragmentary to know with any certainty and scholars are divided on its interpretation.
