= Pesher on Genesis =

Jewish sectarian commentary on the Book of Genesis found among the Dead Sea Scrolls

The Pesher on Genesis, or Commentaries on Genesis, is part of the collection of the Dead Sea Scrolls found in caves near the archaeological site of Qumran about a mile off the Northwestern shore of the Dead Sea. There are four fragmentary manuscripts that have been grouped together from Cave 4: 4Q252, 4Q253, 4Q254, and 4Q254a which contain interpretations of the Book of Genesis. The most extensive of the manuscripts is 4Q252 which contains 6 fragments. They date from mid 1st century BCE (Hasmonean period) to late 1st century CE (Herodian period). They are all written in Hebrew on parchment.

== 4Q252 ==
4Q252 or 4QCommentary on Genesis A, as it was called by the final editor George Brooke, is dated using a paleographical method back to the early Herodian era or the latter half of 1st century BCE. 4Q252 contains six fragments that hold most of the six column commentary or pesher of certain passages on Genesis. The six fragment hold an almost complete scroll on which was only written on one piece of parchment. For almost a decade two of the fragments was believed to be 4Q Patriarchal Blessings but J. T. Milik realized that those two fragments belonged with others as part of a single composition.

=== Physical Description ===
Due to the difference in the decomposition of the scrolls the actual size of the scrolls slightly decreases over time

Fragment 1 approx. 20.3 cm x 13 cm

Fragment 2 approx. 2.5 cm x 2.3 cm

Fragment 3 approx. 3.8 cm x 3.6 cm

Fragment 4 approx. 2.6 cm x 2.2 cm

Fragment 5 approx. 8.3 cm x 4.5 cm

Fragment 6 approx. 9.2 cm x 4.6 cm

=== Contents ===
There are 6 columns extant of 4Q252, some more fragmentary than others.

Column I and II lines 1–7 mostly retell and expand slightly the story of Noah and the flood from Genesis 6–9. In this portion, the author was mostly concerned with including more dating details than appear in Genesis.

Column II lines 8–14 and all of column III focus on the story of Abraham, including the judgement on Sodom and Gomorrah and the binding of Isaac. Column III is especially fragmentary, with several blanks.

Columns IV–VI are based on Genesis 49, Jacob's blessing of his twelve sons.

Column IV covers Jacob's blessing of Reuben. The author's comment on Jacob's blessing is an exclusively negative portrayal of Reuben.

== 4Q253 ==
4Q253 (Commentary on Genesis B) consists of three fragments that were found in cave four at the Qumran site. The first fragment mentions the Ark of the Covenant and may deal with Noah and the flood, but the sense of the comments is far from clear. The second fragment is said to be associated with Jacob and his cultic activities. Fragment three cannot actually be placed specifically in relation to the Genesis text, however, it speaks of Belial – the traditional name for Satan in Jewish apocalyptic writings.

=== Physical Description ===
The fragments are quite small in size and show the very bottom of columns on a commentary of Genesis. Unfortunately, due to the poor state of the fragments, scholars are unable to determine the size of what the full manuscript would have been.

Frg. 1 = 3.1 x 3.9 cm

Frg. 2 = 5.2 x 6.2 cm (two joined pieces)

Frg. 3 = 3.2 x 3.0 cm

The fragments are almost certainly recognized to have been written by the same scribe due to the type of writing – a formal script from the late Hasmonaean to the early Herodian period.

== 4Q254 ==
There are 17 fragments grouped as 4Q254, or Commentary on Genesis C. These fragments are not extensive, but they seem to offer interpretations of blessings and curses. The content of the fragments covers the curse on Canaan, the grandson of Noah from Genesis 9:24–25; the events leading up to the binding of Isaac in Gen. 22:5–7; the blessing of Judah from Gen. 49:8–12; a commentary on the 'two anointed ones' possibly from Zechariah 4:14 or perhaps part of the blessing on Judah in Gen 49:8–12; Jacob's prophecy concerning Issachar and Dan in Gen. 49:15–17; and Jacob's prophecy concerning Joseph from Gen. 49:22–25.

=== Physical Description ===
The overall preservation as well as palaeographic and orthographic evidence shows the likelihood that these fragments really do belong together. They were all written in early Herodian formal hand. In fact, all 17 fragments appear to have the same scribal hand. Several of the scribe's letters (their formation consistently throughout all the fragments) suggests a transition from the late Hasmonaean to the early Herodian formal hand.

Frg. 1= 2.9 x 3.7 cm

Frg. 2=1.0 x 1.7 cm

Frg. 3=3.4 x 7.8 cm

Frg. 4=4.1 x 6.6 cm

Frg. 5=2.1 x 5.1 cm

Frg. 6=2.1 x 3.6 cm

Frg. 7=2.1 x 2.6 cm

Frg. 8=1.9 x 6.2 cm

Frg. 9=1.6 x 2.6 cm

Frg. 10=2.1 x 1.9 cm

Frg. 11=1.2 x 2.8 cm

Frg. 12=2.1 x 2.8 cm

Frg. 13=1.2 x 2.5 cm

Frg. 14=1.0 x 3.5 cm

Frg. 15=1.7 x 4.4 cm

Frg. 16=5.3 x 5.6 cm

Frg. 17=1.3 x 0.7 cm

The fragments range from pale tan, to light brown, to a dark brown in color. Several fragments contain damage likely caused by worms, and some seem to preserve traces of ink on the reverse as if those scrolls were wound very tightly in years gone by.

== 4Q254a ==
The fourth manuscript in this group, also known as 4QCommentary on Genesis D or pGen IVa, is extant in three fragments in a developed Herodian formal hand. In fragments 1–2 there is a description of the measurements of Noah's ark, partly citing Genesis 6.15 . Fragment 3 is concerned with Noah's disembarkation and something that the raven makes known to the latter generations.

=== Physical Description ===
Fragment 1 is 3.8 cm x 3.2 cm, the left hand edge is very dark brown and can be read with the assistance of infrared photography. The rest of the fragment is tan colour and there is no visible ruling showing

Fragment 2 is 1.7 cm x 1.4 cm. On this fragment both the left and the right edges are very dark brown the rest being tan.

Fragment 3 is two pieces attached together measuring a total of 6.6 cm x 5.0 cm. Its lower right corner and far left edge are dark brown, the rest being tan. An upper margin of 1.9 cm is preserved and ruled guidelines as well as a ruled left margin are visible.

Both Fragment 2 and Fragment 3 are attached to paper and on the card in Mus. Inv. 820 and is not movable

=== Palaeography ===
The principal reason for distinguishing these three fragments from 4Q254 is the distinctive shape of some of the letters. The features of these letters were developed and more commonly used in the Herodian formal hand. These differences in the formatting of the letters show that it was a different scribe who penned these scroll fragments.
