= Nahum Commentary =

Jewish sectarian commentary on the Book of Nahum found among the Dead Sea Scrolls

The Nahum Commentary or Pesher Nahum, labelled 4QpNah (Cave 4, Qumran, pesher, Nahum) or 4Q169, was among the Dead Sea Scrolls in cave 4 of Qumran that was discovered in August 1952. The editio princeps of the text is to be found in DJD V., edited by John Allegro. The text is described thus: 'one of the "continuous pesharim" from Qumran, successive verses from the biblical Book of Nahum are interpreted as reflecting historical realities of the 1st century BCE."

== Text ==
The most clearly historical references in the text can be found in Fragments 3-4 Column 1, which cites Nahum 2:11b, "Where the lion goes to enter, there also goes the whelp..." and provides the commentary,

"[This refers to Deme]trius, king of Greece, who sought to enter Jerusalem through the counsel of the Flattery-Seekers; [but it never fell into the] power of the kings of Greece from Antiochus until the appearance of the rulers of the kittim...."

According to Larry R. Helyer (as well as to many other scholars), Demetrius in this text is Demetrius III Eucaerus (95-88 BCE), the Seleucid king who defeated Alexander Jannaeus in battle, but was forced to withdraw back to Syria.

The text refers to the biblical passages from Nahum 1:3-6; 2:12-14; 3:1-5, 6-9, 10-12, 14.

== See also ==
- The Seekers after Smooth Things

== Bibliography ==
- Allegro, John M., Qumran Cave 4, I (4Q158-4Q186) DJD V. (Oxford, 1968) editio princeps, pp. 37–42.
- Berrin, Shani L., The Pesher Nahum Scroll from Qumran: An Exegetical Study of 4Q169. (Leiden: Brill, 2004) ISBN 978-9004124844
- Berrin, Shani L., "Pesher Nahum" in Encyclopedia of the Dead Sea Scrolls, eds Lawrence H. Schiffman and James C. VanderKam, Volume 2. (Oxford, 2000) ISBN 0-19-513797-3, pp. 653–655.
- Doudna, Gregory, 4Q Pesher Nahum: A Critical Edition. (Sheffield Academic Press, 2002) ISBN 978-1841271569
- Charlesworth, James H., Henry W. L. Rietz, Casey D. Elledge, and Lidija Novakovic. Pesharim, Other Commentaries, and Related Documents. The Dead Sea Scrolls: Hebrew, Aramaic, and Greek Texts with English Translations 6b. Louisville: Westminster John Knox, 2002. (More recent publication of the Hebrew text and English translation on facing pages)
- Cross, Frank Moore. The Ancient Library of Qumran. 3d ed. Minneapolis: Fortress, 1995. (General reading on the Dead Sea Scrolls in general, their discovery, and contents)
- Ingrassia, David,(2002)CLASS 3 Biblical Commentaries:Pesharim. Dead Sea Scrolls and the Bible.
- http://www.preteristarchive.com/BibleStudies/DeadSeaScrolls/4Q169_pesher_nahum.html
