= Émile Puech =

French Catholic priest and biblical scholar

Émile Puech (born 9 May 1941, at Cazelles de Sébrazac, Estaing, Aveyron, France) is a French Catholic priest, epigrapher and editor in chief of Manuscrits de la mer Morte. He is a government employed director of research at Paris' Centre national de la recherche scientifique. He has amended suggested readings and translations of some of the Dead Sea Scrolls, for example 4Q521. He is a member of the editorial board of the scholarly journal Antiguo Oriente and a frequent contributor of the academic journal Revue Biblique.

== Publications ==
- É. Puech, 'À propos de la Jérusalem Nouvelle d'après les manuscrits de la Mer Morte', Semitica 43-4 (1995) 87-102;
