= 4Q448 =

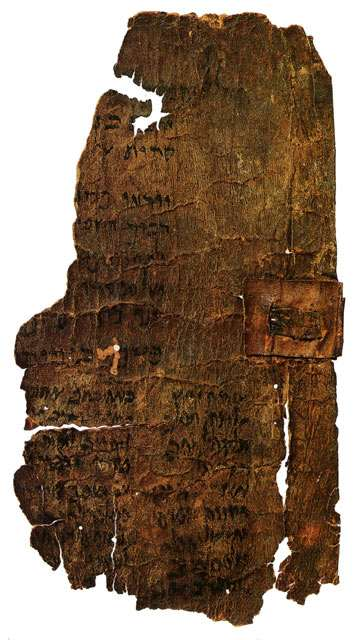

4Q448, often called the "Hymn to King Jonathan," is a piece of parchment from among the Dead Sea Scrolls, found in Cave 4, containing two separate short works, part of Psalm 154 and a prayer mentioning a King Jonathan (Yəhōnatan).

The only King Jonathan in Jewish history was Alexander Jannaeus ("Jannaeus" being an abbreviated form of "Jonathan") and it is widely believed that this was the King Jonathan of 4Q448, though some doubt has been raised over the identification.

The first column of the prayer may read:

1 "the holy city,
2 for Jonathan the king
3 and all the congregation of your people
4 Israel
5 which have been dispersed to the four
6 winds of the heavens
7 let peace be on all of them
8 and your kingdom"
9 "And may your name be praised"

Others translate the first and second line quite differently:

"Arise O Holy One
against' Jonathan the king"

If this text does in fact portray Alexander Jannaeus in a favorable light, it discounts his identification as the Wicked Priest, a figure mentioned in other scrolls. For the reading that the text is against Alexander Jannaeus, according to K. Penner, E. Main, A Lemaire, D. Harrington and J. Strugnell, G. Lorein, and S. Goranson, with bibliography, see Goranson in the references, as well as Emmanuelle Main in the footnotes. In this interpretation, the prayer is asking God himself to rise against the king.

According to Steudel (2006), 4Q448 is quite similar to the larger manuscript 4QMMT based on philological analysis. Therefore these two manuscripts may have originally belonged to the same composition.
