= Testament of Qahat =

Dead Sea scroll manuscript

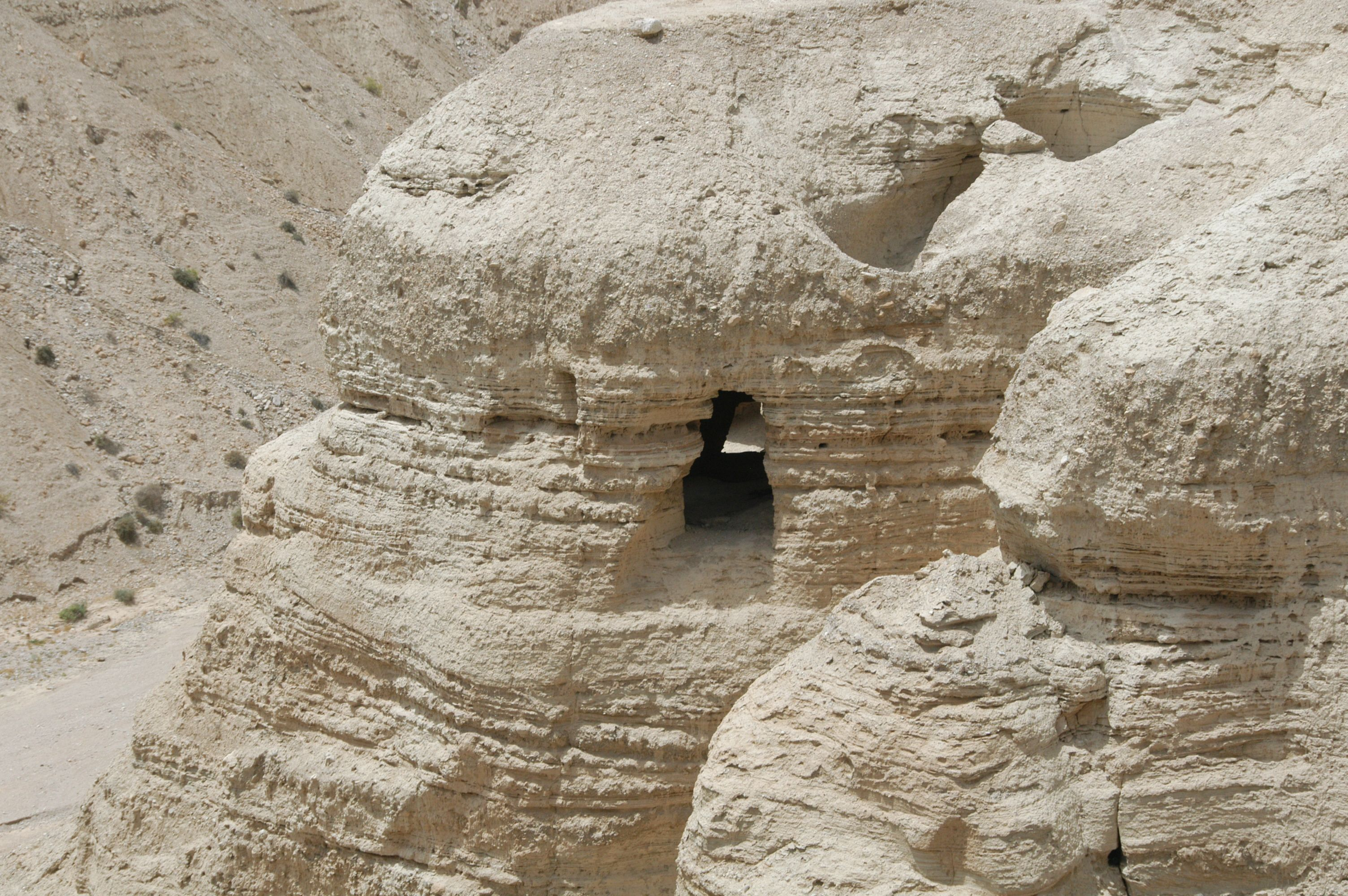
Cave four

The Testament of Qahat is a text found among the Dead Sea Scrolls. The manuscript has been dated on palaeographic grounds to 125-10 BCE, and the composition of this manuscript even earlier. It was written as a continuation to the Words of Levi, followed by the Visions of Amram.

Qahat (Kehath or Kohath), a righteous man, was the second son of Levi, and lived to be 133 years old. He was the father of the Kohathites and was appointed to carry the Ark of the Covenant along with sacred utensils of the tabernacle during the Israelites' journey through the desert. The Testament of Qahat is addressed to his son Amram, regarding the sacredness of the texts and laws that have been passed down from previous fathers all the way to Noah. Qahat speaks specifically about the inheritance being passed down, which is believed to be the books and laws given from God, passed down generationally from Noah to Shem, Abraham to Isaac, Isaac to Jacob, Jacob to Levi and then to Qahat.

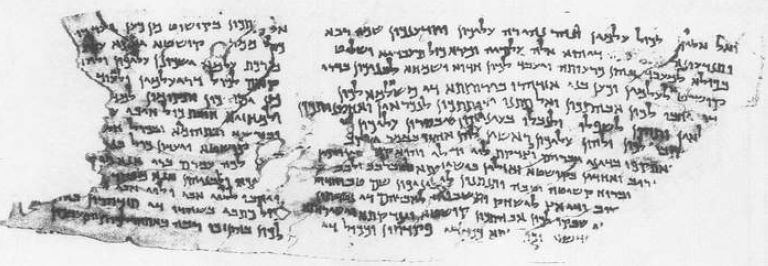
Testament of Qahat Scroll Fragment

== Discovery and state of document ==
4Q542 was found in Cave 4, also commonly known as the mother lode of manuscript fragments. Cave 4 was found in August 1952 by Bedouin treasure hunters exploring under the noses of the archaeologists excavating Qumran. "The most legendary of all caves, Cave 4 revealed ample treasures: thousands of fragments from hundreds of manuscripts, comprising 75% of all material from the Qumran caves, including parts of biblical and apocryphal books, biblical commentaries, works on Jewish law, prayers, sectarian texts, tefillin and mezuzot." Many fragments in this Cave are often difficult to decipher and translate due to the poor preservation of manuscripts.

== Composition ==
These fragments were found in Cave 4, written on parchment dating back to the Hasmonean period. 4Q542 is one of the best preserved Qumran pieces found. This 100 BCE Aramaic manuscript was found in three separate fragments. Fragment 1 consists of one large piece of fragment enlarged by a material which is joined with a smaller piece as well as two other smaller fragments. The large piece of fragment one contains almost two complete columns; one complete column of 13 lines and half of another column fully intact. The smaller fragments, however, present no contexts to aid in any interpretation. "Fragment two alludes to darkness and light and fragment three mentions precious stones extant in large numbers apparently on account of forication."

Testaments usually end with a narrative of the speaker's death as is the case in 4Q542; The Testament of Qahat was written on Qahat's death bed as a farewell. The two small fragments appear to continue with the admonition, so the length of the actual whole scroll is uncertain. The transmission of the priestly teachings is highly significant to this manuscript and a high-priestly line plays an important role in these three fragments.

== Authorship ==
The setting of the text is a typical example of ‘death bed’ literature similar to the testaments of the twelve patriarchs but characterized like the testaments of Levi and Amram by its priestly perspective. The farewell address is from Kohath, the son of Levi, to his sons – presumably Amram, Izhar, Hebron, and Uzziel, but it specifically mentions Amram, on the privileges and responsibilities of the priesthood. The speaker clearly mentions ‘Amram my son’ (frag 1 ii 11) and ‘Levi my father’ (frag 1 ii 9) indicating that he, in fact, is Qahat. The manuscript has been dated on palaeographic grounds to 125-10 BCE and the composition of this manuscript even earlier. The first part of this manuscript stresses the transition of teachings passed down from Abraham through Issac, Levi, Qahat and finally to Amram. The manuscript addresses the inheritance received from their fathers which are intended to be passed down to future generations. The genealogy written highly stresses the importance of passing down the values and teaching of the priestly traditions, keeping the priesthood and its duties and prerogatives pure.

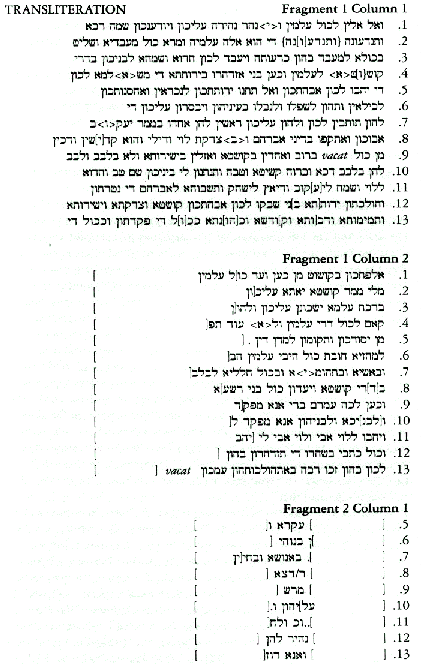
Testament of Qahat Translated

== Content ==
The three fragments contain the farewell exhortation of Qahat to his sons and in particular to his firstborn Amran, Moses’ father, for the priestly family of Aaron to keep the eternal covenant. In the style well known from the Testament of Enoch and the Testaments of the Twelve Patriarchs, Qahat urges his sons to be just, pure and truthful. Qahat does not specify precisely the topics disclosed, at least not in the fragments that are available, however, the overall priestly tone of the inheritance of knowledge passed down from Levi to Qahat and then the knowledge would be passed down to Amram in this manuscript. The most prominent issue for Qahat appears to be the concern of the purity of the priestly line. While there are debates whether this was the question of the Gentile influence on the priestly line, or the concern relates to the fact that gentile rulers had been appointing the high priests from non-traditional lineages beginning with Onias or even intermarriage with strangers or those outside the pure priesthood line. Also the importance of keeping the lineage and priesthood pure by restrictions on priestly marriages with gentiles. The warnings directed to his children in these manuscripts were to protect their heritage from mingling (frag 1 column i ) with 'half-breeds and strangers'. These qualities are attributed to Qahat's ancestors Abraham, Issac, Jacob and levi. The detailed instruction Isaac provides for his grandson Levi concerning the ‘law of the priesthood’ is a core component. This geology of instruction is composed of “both proper moral conduct and correct knowledge of cultic/sacerdotal processes, elements, vestments, and ablutions.” Like Qahat or Levi who learned correct sacrificial processes from their grandparents, similar findings with Tobit were found as he was instructed in the finer points of bringing appropriate offerings by his grandparent. The two motifs complement one another and underscore a chain of tradition. Qahat also passes on to his sons the books of his forefathers. One line mentions the priesthood which obviously was of major concern to the descendants of Levi. Also mentions eternal blessings bestowed on Qahat's sons. This appears to allude to the eternal priestly covenant made. priesthood and its duties and prerogatives pure. Although the text does not mention any specific historical figures that may have been around while this manuscript was being made, a possible "Sitz im Leben for this testament is the religious crisis ignited by the accession of Menelaus to the high-priestly office in 171 B.C.E." If so, the testament and its congeners from Qumran, the Testament of Levi and the Vision of Amram, may have formed some of the earliest literature of the 'Asideans' (I Macc. 2:42).

== Interpretation and influence ==
The major influence of the testament Qahat is it is another textual documentation that reveals information of the priestly lines, specifically Levi and his son Qahat, and his son Amran. This lineage is mentioned in Exodus 6:16-20. This testament wanted the children of Qahat to be blessed and asks that God makes his name known to his children along with his power and goodness (frag 1 i 1–4). The most emphasized teachings in this testament is the importance of preserving these writings through the Priesthood, as well as refraining from mingling with outsiders causing interbreeding.

The significance of Testament of Qahat is its evidential support of the importance of passing down Priestly teachings through the Priesthood bloodline. It was very important that the inheritance, which are the priestly teachings be passed down from father to son. In the testament the author speaks about Amran his son and Levi, his father, proving the author to be Qahat. There is evidence to this in the book of Jubilee where Abraham writes that he is passing down the books of his forefather from Enoch and Noah, and passing them down to Isaac (Jubilee 7:38-39,10:14). It also closely resembles writings in the Aramaic Levi Document. There is no other trace of the Testament of Qahat anywhere else other than what was found at Cave 4. The parts of the document that were found stress the importance of teachings being passed down in the priestly line from Abraham and originally as found in the ALD, from Noah. In the Aramaic Levi Document when Levi is robed and anointed he is taught by Isaac he writes, "When he learned that I was priest of the Most High God, of the Lord of Heaven, he began to instruct and to teach me the law of priesthood" (5:8). This is the same idea found in the Testament of Qahat, as it is speaking about the same priestly line. Levi's lessons in the ALD are lengthy and deal with the preparation of sacrifices, detailing the preparation of the wood of the altar and the elements in the sacrifice.
