= The Samuel Scroll =

Fragments containing parts of the Books of Samuel

The Samuel scroll is a collection of four manuscript fragments containing parts of the Book of Samuel which were found among the Dead Sea Scrolls.

== The Book of Samuel at Qumran ==
What is commonly known as two books in many Christian Bibles, 1 and 2 Samuel form a single book (Books of Samuel) in the Masoretic text as well as in the manuscripts found at Qumran. Of the four fragments of Samuel found at Qumran, one was discovered in Cave 1 and three more in Cave 4.

=== 1Q Samuel ===
1Q Samuel (1QSam; 1Q7) was found in Cave 1 and contains remnants of a manuscript that contained parts from 1 Samuel 18 and 2 Samuel 20:6-10, 21:16-18, and 23:9-12. The variants within this text include a missing long stretch in 20:8, as well as some peculiar readings of proper nouns (21:18, 23:9). The text is in Hebrew, written in square script and dates from the Hellenistic-Roman period.

=== 4Q Samuel^{a} ===
4Q Samuel^{a} (4QSam^{a}; 4Q51) was found in Cave 4 at Qumran, and dates from 50-25 BCE ("Herodian" period). The text is in Hebrew and written in square script. This scroll is the most extensive, and it preserves fragments of 1 Samuel 1 - 2 Samuel 24. It contains many readings that are different from the Masoretic Text but that closely resemble those in the Septuagint. Some examples are as follows:

- 1 Samuel 1:23 in 4QSam^{a} reads, "only the Lord establish what proceeded out of your mouth", while the Masoretic Text reads, "only the Lord establish his word".
- 1 Samuel 1:24 in 4QSam^{a} reads, "with a three-year-old [bullock]; Masoretic reads "with three bullocks".
- 1 Samuel 2:17 in 4QSam^{a} reads, "for they (namely Eli’s sons) dealt contemptuously with the offering of the Lord"; the Masoretic Text reads, "for the men (namely the worshippers or Eli's sons helpers, according to some exegetes) dealt contemptuously with the offering of the Lord".

=== 4Q Samuel^{b} ===
4Q Samuel^{b} (4QSam^{b}; 4Q52) was found in Cave 4 at Qumran and contains parts of 1 Samuel 16:1-11, 19:10-17, 20:26-21:10, and 23:9-17. It is the oldest of the four manuscripts, dating to the end of the third century/beginning of second century BCE ("Early Hellenistic" period). The text is in Hebrew and written in square script. The orthography is similar to that of the Masoretic Text in the Pentateuch, and shares many readings with both the Septuagint (such as the designation of Samuel as "the seer" in 1 Samuel 9:18,19) and the Masoretic Text (as in 1 Samuel 20:34, "on the second day of the new moon" that reads against the Septuagint's "on the second of the month." The Masoretic Text and Samuel^{b} imply a two-day feast for the New Moon while the Septuagint tells of a one-day New Moon followed by an ordinary day).

=== 4Q Samuel^{c} ===
4Q Samuel^{c} (4QSam^{c}; 4Q53), also found in Cave 4 at Qumran, was written by the same scribe who wrote the Rule of the Community, as shown by the orthography and the specific spellings of words such as z'wt ("this"), 'bdkh ("your servant") and wy’wmr ("and he said"). These variants are quite insignificant, however, and do not relate directly to the Masoretic Text (MT) or the Septuagint. One variant that is found in both the scroll and the Septuagint is in 2 Samuel 14:30. The MT ends with the note of the burning of Joab's field, but the Septuagint continues on and recounts how Joab's servants told him about it "with their clothes rent". The scroll reads, "[and the s]ervants of Joab [came] to him, with [their clothes] rent [and said 'the ser]vants of Absalom [have set] the field on fire'." The text is in Hebrew, written in square script and dates from Hasmonean period.

== New perspectives on passages from the Qumran Samuel finds ==
=== Height of Goliath ===
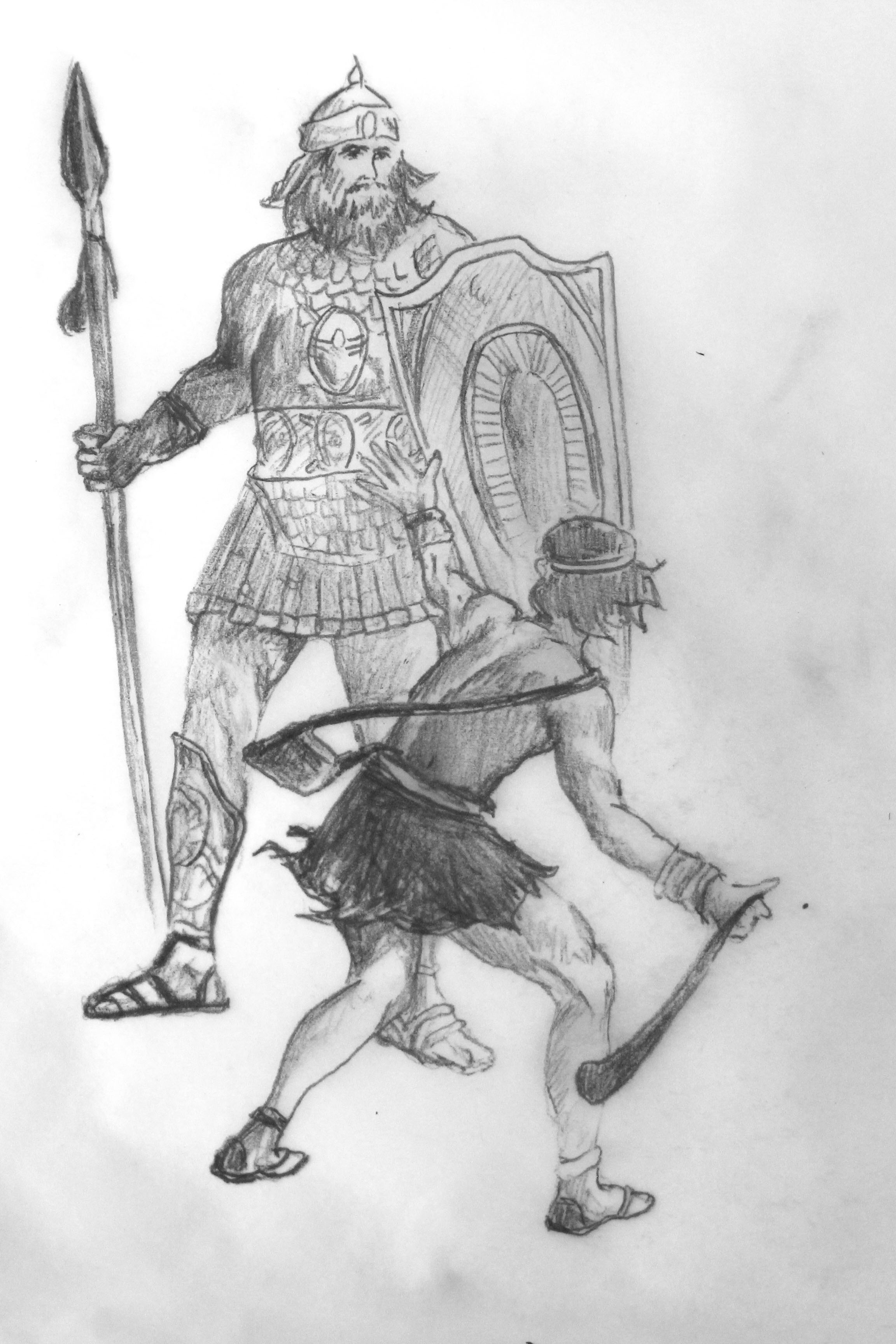
David fights Goliath

One major variation in the Samuel text is in 1 Samuel 17:4. While both the Septuagint and Josephus' writings attributed only four cubits and a span (possibly about 6 feet 6 inches (198 cm) to Goliath's height, the Masoretic Text recorded Goliath's height as six cubits (possibly about 9 feet 6 inches (290 cm). The Septuagint writes, "καὶ ἐξῆλθεν ἀνὴρ δυνατὸς ἐκ τῆς παρατάξεως τῶν ἀλλοφύλων Γολιὰθ ὄνομα αὐτῶν ἐκ Γέθ, ὕψος αὐτοῦ τεσσάρων πήχεων καὶ σπιθαμῆς·" The translation of this verse reads, "And there went forth a mighty man out of the army of the Philistines, Goliath, by name, out of Geth, his height [was] four cubits and a span.". Furthermore, In Josephus' account of this story, he writes, "Now there came down a man out of the camp of the Philistines, whose name was Goliath, of the city of Gath, a man of vast bulk, for he was of four cubits and a span in tallness ... ." However, because the Masoretic Text was written in the original Hebrew language and was considered to be an older version of the text, scholars used its translation for years, attributing to Goliath an unusual height.

=== Missing section from 1 Samuel 10 ===
According to the Masoretic Text (MT) and Septuagint (LXX), Saul returns home and a month following, Nahash the Ammonite declares that he will only make a treaty with the people of Jabesh-gilead if he can gouge out everyone's right eye. This punishment seemed harsh for punishment of this kind was meant for those who discretely or violently rebelled.

10:26 Saul also went to his home at Gibeah, and with him went men of valor whose hearts God had touched. ^{27} But some worthless fellows said, "How can this man save us?" And they despised him and brought him no present. But he held his peace. 11:1 About a month later, Nahash the Ammonite went up and besieged Jabesh-gilead; and all the men of Jabesh said to Nahash, "Make a treaty with us, and we will serve you." ^{2} But Nahash the Ammonite said to them, "On this condition I will make a treaty with you, namely that I gouge out everyone's right eye, and thus put disgrace upon all Israel."

However, 4QSam^{a}, which was copied in around 50 BCE, includes a passage missing from the MT and LXX that describes similar treatment of the Gadites and Reubenites, which is considered to clarify the text. This portion is found in column 10. The additional passage from the Samuel scroll has been integrated by the translators of the New Revised Standard Version. This version is the first of its kind to do so.

10:26 Saul also went to his home at Gibeah, and with him went men of valor whose hearts God had touched. ^{27} But some worthless fellows said, "How can this man save us?" And they despised him and brought him no present. But he held his peace.

Now Nahash, king of the Ammonites, had been grievously oppressing the Gadites and the Reubenites. He would gouge out the right eye of each of them and would not grant Israel a deliverer. No one was left of the Israelites across the Jordan whose right eye Nahash, king of the Ammonites, had not gouged out. But there were seven thousand men who had escaped from the Ammonites and had entered Jabesh-gilead.

11:1 About a month later, Nahash the Ammonite went up and besieged Jabesh-gilead; and all the men of Jabesh said to Nahash, "Make a treaty with us, and we will serve you."^{2} But Nahash the Ammonite said to them, "On this condition I will make a treaty with you, namely that I gouge out everyone’s right eye, and thus put disgrace upon all Israel."

— New Revised Standard Version

Thus, the Samuel scroll found at Qumran includes a passage missing from the traditional Masoretic Text and Septuagint. The editors believe that the passage was accidentally omitted by a scribe copying a manuscript in which the word “Nahash” marked the end of two successive paragraphs, such that after copying the first paragraph, he turned back to the manuscript, mistakenly took the second appearance of "Nahash" for the point at which he left off, and continued on from that point.

The missing passage provides readers with two key pieces of information: 1. It was common for Nahash to gouge out people's right eyes; 2. the 7,000 men that fled from the Ammonites had taken refuge in Jabesh-gilead, which is why the city was being treated by Nahash as a stronghold for rebels. Therefore, the harsh behaviour and brutal punishment of the Ammonite Nahash has been illuminated by the additional excerpt in 4QSam^{a}, allowing its readers to comprehend the text by explaining the book's complicated history.

Additionally, this fragment was included by Josephus in his Antiquities of the Jews, who may have adopted these writings from texts similar to 4QSam^{a}. Josephus wrote of Nahash's practice of putting out the right eyes of warriors, leaving them useless in battle when their left eye was covered by their shield.
