= Józef Milik =

Polish priest and Biblical scholar (1922–2006)

Jozef Milik
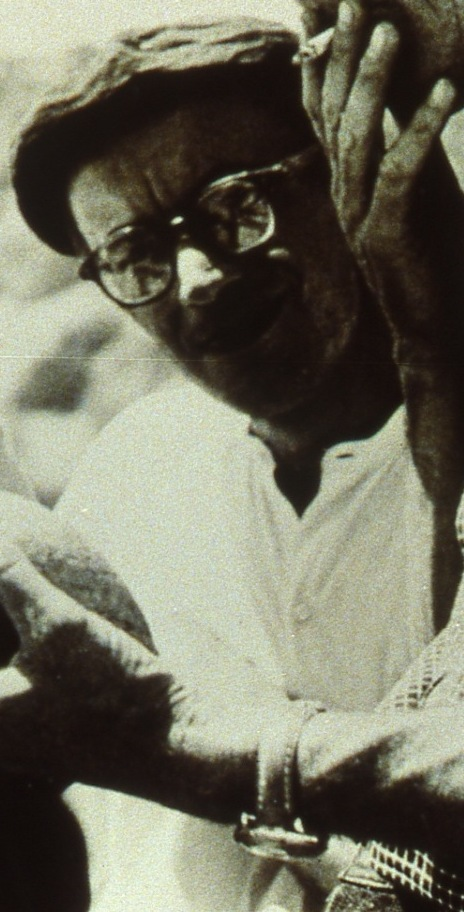
- Milik in 1954
- Born: 24 March 1922; Seroczyn, Poland
- Died: 6 January 2006 (aged 83); Ile-de-France, France

Józef Tadeusz Milik (24 March 1922 – 6 January 2006) was a Polish biblical scholar and a Catholic priest, researcher of the Dead Sea Scrolls (DSS) through the deserts of Judea/Jordan, and translator and editor of the Book of Enoch in Aramaic (fragments).

He was fluent in Russian, Italian, French, German, and English besides his native Polish, plus many ancient and dead languages including Hebrew, Greek, Latin, Aramaic, Syriac, Old Church Slavonic, Arabic, Georgian, Ugaritic, Akkadian, Sumerian, Egyptian, and Hittite.

== Biography ==
He was born into a peasant family in a small village in central Poland. His father, despite being a farmer, was interested in science, educated himself and gathered a rich library. He influenced his son, who finished the gymnasium in Siedlce and later entered the theological college in Płock in 1939. When the college was closed by Germans after they invaded Poland, he moved to Warsaw. After World War 2, he studied at Catholic University of Lublin and in 1946 was ordained a priest.

Work on the Dead Sea Scrolls

Józef Milik deciphered hundreds of the texts of the Dead Sea Scrolls as a member of the publication team. He started translating and publishing them in the early 1950s while a student at the Pontifical Biblical Institute in Rome.

Then he joined Roland Vaux’s team and helped to discover Cave 3, excavated and unearthed hundreds of fragments from Cave 4, and took part in the discovery and excavations of Caves 5 and 6. He later became one of the most essential participants of the translation and publication team. Although he published more new Dead Sea Scrolls texts than any other scholar, he had too many documents assigned to him, which slowed the overall progress of publication; additionally, his work began to suffer later in life as a result of alcohol use disorder.

== Milestones ==
- 1944 Entered Catholic University of Lublin to study Hebrew, Greek, Latin, Aramaic, Syriac, and Old Church Slavonic
- 1946 Ordained as a Catholic priest in Warsaw
- Late-1940s Attended Pontifical Oriental Institute and Pontifical Biblical Institute to study Arabic, Georgian, Ugaritic, Akkadian, Sumerian, Egyptian, and Hittite
- 1950 Gained a licentiate summa cum laude
- 1951 Began working in Jerusalem to decipher DSS; devised a system of designating the fragments
- 1955 Co-edited first major DSS publication for Cave 1 texts: "Discoveries in the Judaean Desert"
- 1956 Heralded by Time magazine as "the fastest man with a fragment"
- 1959 Published Ten Years of Discovery in the Wilderness of Judaea describing the Dead Sea Scrolls discovery (revision and translation of the 1957 book "Dix ans de découvertes dans le Désert de Juda")
- 1969 Leaves the priesthood and marries Polish art historian Jolanta Zaluska in Rome. Moves to Paris
- 1976 Published The Books of Enoch

After moving to Paris, Milik worked as a researcher for the Centre National de la Recherche Scientifique until his retirement in 1987.

== Bibliography ==
- Milik, Józef (1957). Dix ans de découverte dans le désert de Juda. Discoveries in the Judean Desert.
- Milik, Józef (1972). Milki-sedeq et Milki-resa dans les anciens écrits juifs et chrétiens.
- Milik, Józef (1976). The Books of Enoch: Aramaic Fragments Qumran Cave 4. With the collaboration of Black M.
- Milik, Józef (1978). Écrits préesséniens de Qumran : d’Hénoch à Amram.
- Martinez/Tigchelaar (1999). The Dead Sea Scrolls Edition [Hénoc au pays des aromates pp. 413, 425, 430]; Caves 1 to 11 & more, with Aramaic frag. and English translation.
- Puech, Émile (2000). "Milik, Jozef T". In Schiffman, Lawrence; VanderKam, James (eds.). Encyclopedia of the Dead Sea Scrolls. Oxford: Oxford University Press. pp. I:552–554.
- Feather, Robert; Kapera, Zdzislaw J. (2011). Jozef Milik, Doyen of The Dead Sea Scrolls. Krakow - Mogilany: The Enigma Press.
