= The Seekers After Smooth Things =

Polemic epithet found in the Dead Sea Scrolls

The Seekers After Smooth Things is the name given to a group referred to in the Dead Sea Scrolls, in fragments 3 and 4 of the Pesher Nahum (4Q169). The term is used to designate those who appealed to Demetrius III Eucaerus, in opposition to Alexander Jannaeus and the community that produced the scrolls.

The context within the Pesher Nahum describes the seekers as an organized violent group and claims they can be responsible for numerous deaths. They are also blamed for their impression of others by misleading kings, princes, priests, and ordinary members of the nation. The seekers are also seen as traitors who act opposite of the divine plan. The view is that at the end of days the seekers after smooth things will be unmasked and despised, their misleading will be over and they will face punishment. One punishment suggested in the Temple Scroll for those who oppose God is to be hanged on a tree until death.

The group is most commonly identified with the Pharisees, though this identification is by no means certain. One interpretation is that the "seekers after smooth things" was an epithet referencing the larger contingent of Pharisees inasmuch as they were less strict in some aspects than the Essenes (in this sense a religious splinter group). Too, the ḥalaqot (smooth) of the text may be a pun on what they viewed as the more lenient rulings (halakhot) of their opponents.

The seekers are believed to have come from and reside in Jerusalem. Hodayot suggests a large amount of hostility between the community and the seekers. It claims how God saved them from the seekers. This is an indication of persecution of the community members by the seekers.
