= Pseudo-Ezekiel =

Also known as 4QPseudo-Ezekiel, and referred to in older reference sources as 4QSecond Ezekiel, Pseudo-Ezekiel is a fragmentary, pseudepigraphic, Hebrew text found in Cave 4 at Qumran, and belongs to the cache of manuscripts popularly known as the Dead Sea Scrolls. It is also classified as "parabiblical" and considered, in some accounts, as "apocalyptic" as well. Not known even in the scholarly world until the late 1980s, and not published until 2001, Pseudo-Ezekiel has emerged as one of the most controversial texts among Qumran finds in the early years of the twenty-first century.

== Sources ==
At first, all of the Cave 4 fragments from 4Q385-4Q391 were identified as belonging to Pseudo-Ezekiel, but ultimately this was revised, separating out 4Q385a, 4Q387a, 4Q388a and 4Q389 as belonging to a "Pseudo-Moses", 4Q390 as a "Pseudo-Moses Apocalypse" with 4Q385b and 4Q387b identified as sections "C" and "D" of an Apocryphon of Jeremiah (also partly preserved in 4Q383). Later, this was revised once again, reassigning most of the proposed Mosaic fragments to the Jeremiah Apocryphon. That leaves six fragments—4Q385, 4Q385b, 4Q385c, 4Q386, 4Q388 and 4Q391—as belonging definitively to Pseudo-Ezekiel. 4Q391 is different from the others in that it is a papyrus dating from the end of the second century BCE, at least a hundred years older than the others, which appear to be copies.

== Content ==
4Q385c is illegible, and the remaining text is described as being "in poor condition", but all told the fragments yield four to six columns of text, with some measure of overlap among the various fragments. Other than the obvious flow of the text from Column 1 to Column 2, it is not known how they rightly fit together, although editor Devorah Dimant, who published the text in 2001, has suggested that the sequence of events in the canonical Book of Ezekiel provides a basis for the order currently observed.

The text as a whole appears to be a discussion between Ezekiel and YHWH, beginning with YHWH promising to Ezekiel that the dry bones will be raised and knitted together again to resurrect the kingdom of Israel. The author has taken the biblical account of Ezekiel 37 as his source, but whereas the resurrection of Israel in Ezekiel 37 is a metaphor for national restoration, Pseudo-Ezekiel describes the resurrection of the righteous dead of Israel. Pseudo-Ezekiel therefore takes its place alongside 4Q521 as one of the only two texts found at Qumran which clearly refer to resurrection. This is followed by a prophecy that a "son of Belial" will come to oppress the Israelites, but he will be defeated and "his dominion will not exist". In remaining fragments, Ezekiel asks YHWH if time itself could be made to accelerate so that Israel may reclaim the promised land sooner rather than later. There is a stray segment which redresses the theme of resurrection, followed by a final evocation of the Merkabah, the chariot of YHWH mentioned in Ezekiel 1.

== Origin ==
Although a very small minority of scholars do not concur with this view, the general consensus on Pseudo-Ezekiel is that it is a non-sectarian work that did not originate with the community at Qumran. The early date of 4Q391 indicates that the text existed before the establishment of the Qumran library held in Cave 4. Barry Smith has suggested that if Pseudo-Ezekiel can be dated back fifty years prior that the "son of Belial" indicated in the text may be identified as Antiochus IV Epiphanes (215-164 BCE). However, Dimant has suggested the late second century BCE date of 4Q391 indicates a terminus ante quem for the composition of the work itself, in addition to that of its source.

== Charles Torrey's Pseudo-Ezekiel ==
In his 1930 book, Pseudo-Ezekiel and the Original Prophecy, Charles Cutler Torrey coined the term "Pseudo-Ezekiel" to describe a proposed predecessor to the canonical Book of Ezekiel. In Torrey's claim, he stated that the Book of Ezekiel derived much of its prophecy from a pseudipigraphic work dating from about 230 BCE which was then edited around 200 into the canonical book that we know. Torrey also proposed that elements regarding the Exilic Period in which the historical Ezekiel lived (ca. 623 BCE - ca. 571 BCE) were added in the second round of editing to make the text appear as though it belonged to the Sixth century, rather than the Third. This view was vehemently disputed by most Rabbinic scholars and has not taken hold; however, if such a book as Torrey describes did exist, 4QPseudo-Ezekiel is certainly not that, as the line of derivation runs from the Book of Ezekiel to it, not the other way around.
