= Spiritual marriage =

Spiritual marriage may refer to:

- Bahá'í marriage
- Celestial marriage, a doctrine of Mormonism and Swedenborgianism
- Josephite marriage, a Christian form of marriage without sexual activity
- Mystical marriage, union with God portrayed as a spousal relationship
- A marriage between soulmates
- Spiritual wifery, a form of free love associated with polygamy
- Syneisaktism, cohabitation of a couple who have previously taken vows of chastity
