= Josephite marriage =

Marriage between a man and woman who agree to celibacy

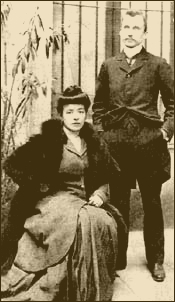
Luigi and Maria Beltrame Quattrocchi lived in a Josephite marriage after they had a family of four children

Josephite marriage, also known as spiritual marriage, chaste marriage, and continent marriage, is a religiously motivated practice in which a man and a woman marry and live together without engaging in sexual activity. The name Josephite comes from Saint Joseph, whose marriage to Mary, mother of Jesus is considered unconsummated by believers in the perpetual virginity of Mary.

== Catholicism ==
A feature of Catholic spiritual marriage, or Josephite marriage, is that the agreement to abstain from sex should be a free mutual decision, rather than resulting from impotence or the views of one party.

In senses beyond spiritual marriage, abstinence is a key concept of Church doctrine that demands celibacy of most priests and all monks, nuns and certain other officials in the Church. The doctrine established a "spiritual marriage" of church officials to their church; in order to better serve God, one had to disavow the demands and temptations of traditional marriage. This rule was enforced by Henry II, Holy Roman Emperor, whose marriage to Cunigunde of Luxemburg was also a very famous spiritual marriage.

Louis Martin and Marie-Azélie Guérin professed to enter a spiritual marriage, but consummated a year later when directed by their confessor to do so. Of the five of their nine children who survived to adulthood, all became nuns, including Thérèse de Lisieux. Thérèse was canonised in 1925 and her parents in 2015.

Occasionally, spiritual marriages may also be entered later in life, with the renunciation of sexual relations after raising a family to fully dedicate oneself to God. In October 2001, John Paul II beatified a married couple, Luigi Beltrame Quattrocchi and Maria Corsini, who bore four children, but later in life lived separately and committed to a Josephite marriage.

== See also ==
- Agapetae
- Asexuality
- Bride of Christ
- Josephines
- Mariage blanc
- Platonic love
- Romantic friendship
- Saint Joseph
- Sexual abstinence
- Spiritual friendship (disambiguation)
- Spiritual wifery
- Sexless marriage
- Syneisaktism
- Yogic marriage
