= Mariage blanc =

Marriage lacking sexual consummation

Mariage blanc (from the French, literally "white marriage") is a marriage that is without consummation. The persons may have married for a variety of reasons, for example, a marriage of convenience is usually entered into in order to aid or rescue one of the spouses from persecution or harm; or for economic, social or legal advantage. Another variety is a lavender marriage, one undertaken to disguise the homosexuality of one or both partners. A sexless marriage, on the other hand, may have begun with the standard expectations. It could also be that the persons chose to get married but are both asexual. A variation on this could be where some form of sexual activity takes place but not intercourse.

== Etymology ==
The expression may derive from the absence of hymenal blood on the couple's wedding-night bed-sheets. However, the French word blanc can also be translated to English as 'blank', as in the sense of empty. For example, cartouche à blanc translates as a blank cartridge, or a cartridge that is lacking a bullet.

== Cases ==
An example is of a Gentile marrying a Jew to protect that person during times of extreme anti-Semitism such as during the lead-up to World War II in areas of Europe menaced by Nazism: "Baron Federico von Berzeviczy-Pallavicini ... [d]uring the thirties ... made a mariage blanc with the niece of Demel's Jewish owners, which allowed her to enter a convent under his name and survive the war."

In Iran white marriages are the opposite of a traditional mariage blanc, meaning a couple cohabiting and having sex without being married. The practice is illegal in Iran, and is heavily decried as an example of "imported western lifestyle", most famously by Supreme Leader Ali Khamenei who described it as "the darkest type of married life". Despite such concerns, the practice became more commonplace at the start of the 21st century.

== Other reasons ==
A mariage blanc may also result if one or both partners discover after their wedding that they are either incapable of, or unwilling to take part in, sexual intercourse resulting in reproduction. Reasons can include asexuality, impotence or hypoactive sexual desire disorder, chronic illness or disability in either or both partners. The marriages of Thomas Carlyle, John Ruskin, Freya Stark and Max Beerbohm are alleged to have not been consummated through impotence. The brief marriage of Pyotr Ilyich Tchaikovsky to Antonina Miliukova might be described as a "lavender marriage".

== See also ==
- Josephite marriage
- Sham marriage
- Ratum sed non consummatum
