= Hosea 2 =

Chapter in the Hebrew bible

- ← chapter 1 chapter 3 →
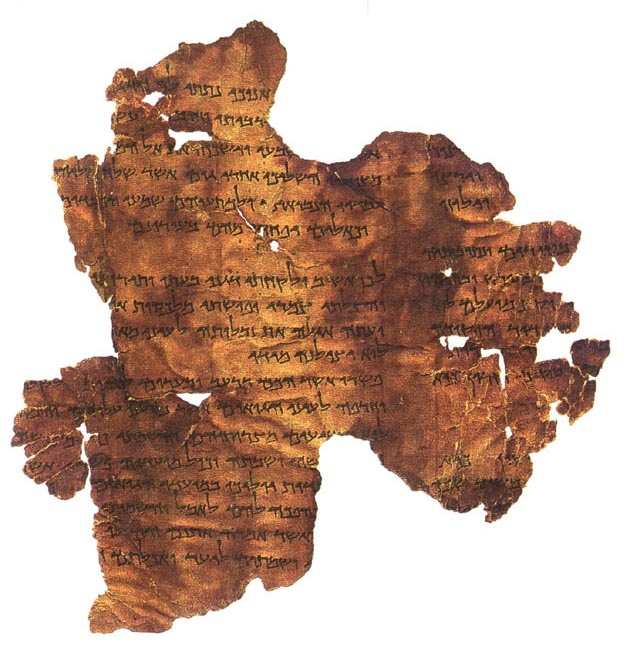
- 4Q166 "The Hosea Commentary Scroll", late first century B.C.
- Book: Book of Hosea
- Category: Nevi'im
- Christian Bible part: Old Testament
- Order in the Christian part: 28

Hosea 2 is the second chapter of the Book of Hosea in the Hebrew Bible or the Old Testament of the Christian Bible. This book contains the prophecies attributed to the prophet Hosea, son of Beeri, and this chapter contains the application of the symbols in the first chapter. It is a part of the Book of the Twelve Minor Prophets.

== Text ==
The original text was written in Hebrew language. This chapter is divided into 23 verses in English Bibles, but counted to 25 verses in Hebrew Bible using a different verse numbering (see below).

=== Verse numbering ===
There are some differences in verse numbering of this chapter in English Bibles and Hebrew texts:

English	Hebrew
1:10-2:1	2:1-3
2:2-23	2:4-25

This article generally follows the common numbering in Christian English Bible versions, with notes to the numbering in Hebrew Bible versions.

=== Textual witnesses ===
Some early manuscripts containing the text of this chapter in Hebrew are of the Masoretic Text tradition, which includes the Codex Cairensis (895), the Petersburg Codex of the Prophets (916), Aleppo Codex (10th century), Codex Leningradensis (1008). Fragments containing parts of this chapter in Hebrew were found among the Dead Sea Scrolls, including 4Q78 (4QXII^{c}; 75–50 BCE) with extant verses 11–13 (verses 13–15 in Hebrew Bible); 4Q79 (4QXII^{d}; 75–50 BCE) with extant verses 1–3 (verses 3–5 in Hebrew Bible); 4Q82 (4QXII^{g}; 25 BCE) with extant verses 2–3, 12–17, 20–23 (verses 1–2, 4–5, 14–19, 22–25 in Hebrew Bible); and 4Q166 (4QpHos^{a}; Hosea Commentary; Pesher Hoshe'a; late first century BCE) with extant verses 8–14.

There is also a translation into Koine Greek known as the Septuagint, made in the last few centuries BCE. Extant ancient manuscripts of the Septuagint version include Codex Vaticanus (B; $\mathfrak{G}$^{B}; 4th century), Codex Alexandrinus (A; $\mathfrak{G}$^{A}; 5th century) and Codex Marchalianus (Q; $\mathfrak{G}$^{Q}; 6th century). (Note: The Book of Hosea is missing from the extant Codex Sinaiticus.)

== Oracle of Salvation: The Reversal of Judgement (1:10-2:1) ==
These three verses reverse the negative meanings of the children's names and apply them to the nation of Israel. The Masoretic Text numbers the verses as 2:1-3.

=== Verse 1 ===
Say to your brothers, Ammi;

and to your sisters, Ruhamah.

In the two last verses of the former chapter, the prophet speaks of God's mercy to Judah and Israel, to that remnant of the seed of Abraham who returned out of captivity, and to the converted Gentiles; now in this verse he calls on them to acknowledge the mercy, and to excite one another to share mutual love and esteem.

== Indictment of Israel, the Unfaithful Wife (2:2–15) ==
The verses are numbered in the Masoretic Text as 2:4–17. The relationship between Yahweh and Israel is depicted as one of husband and wife. Israel has been unfaithful to her husband and gone whoring after her lovers, the idols/Baals, from whom she hopes to obtain 'grain, wine, oil, and other products', without realizing that those actually come from Yahweh (verses 5, 8). Therefore, Yahweh will strip her naked (verse 3, 9–10), block her way to find her lovers (verse 6–7), withdraw the grain, wine, etc. (v. 9), and allow her religious festivities to cease (verse 11, 13). Israel will then return to Yahweh, so Yahweh will bring her in the wilderness, responding to him there, like during the Exodus, and bring her again into Canaan (verses 14–15).

== Remarriage of Yahweh with Israel and the restoration of well-being (2:16–23) ==
The Masoretic Text numbers these verses as 2:18–25. The dominant note of this part is hope that Yahweh and Israel will have a marriage bond again and all will be well.

=== Verses 19–20 ===
“^{19} I will betroth you to Me forever;
Yes, I will betroth you to Me
In righteousness and justice,
In lovingkindness and mercy;
^{20} I will betroth you to Me in faithfulness,
And you shall know the Lord."

- "I will betroth you to Me": from two words in Hebrew: וְאֵרַשְׂתִּ֥יךְ, wə-’ê-raś-tîḵ, "and I will betroth you" ("you" is in the form of second person feminine singular) and לִ֖י, lî, "to me". "Betroth" or "take as wife" here is a verb that refers to 'the legally binding agreement that preceded the wedding', repeated three times in verses 19–20 to imply 'the intense love of God to His people' that this 'marriage covenant' is as if renewed from the start, but on a different footing ("forever") 'through the grace of God writing the law on their hearts by the Spirit of Messiah (Jeremiah 31:31–37)'. It may also denote 'the three Persons of the Triune God, severally engaging to make good the betrothal'.
- "For ever": here in the sense 'that no differences shall destroy the mutual harmony between Jehovah and His people' (cf. Jeremiah 31:35–37; Isaiah 54:8–10).

=== Verse 23 ===
"Then I will sow her for Myself in the earth,
And I will have mercy on her who had not obtained mercy;
Then I will say to those who were not My people,

‘You are My people!’

And they shall say, ‘You are my God!’"

- "I will sow her": referring to the meaning of Jezreel (Hosea 2:22). The prophet's portrayal of a prosperity includes food in abundance, refreshment limited by moderation, and luxuries without stint. There is a complete reversal of the sorrowful circumstances into which sin had plunged Israel, that God's scattering has now become God's sowing. Aben Ezra remarks that "I sow her that they may multiply and be fruitful as the seed of the earth." The unpitied one has found mercy; the rejected one is received with rejoicing.
- "On her that had not obtained mercy": or "on Lo-Ruhamah", or the people of Israel as signified by her (Hosea 1:6) and also the Gentiles (cf. Romans 9:24). They were fulfilled in part in his time, by the conversion of some of the Jews, and by the calling of the Gentiles; but will have a larger accomplishment in the latter day, when all Israel shall obtain mercy, and be saved; see Romans 11:26 and are applicable to God's people who are called by grace at all times.
- "To those who were not my people": or "to Lo-Ammi", the people of Israel, signified by the prophet's child of that name (Hosea 1:9), should no longer be called so, but Ammi, "my people" (Hosea 2:1).
- "Shall say, You are my God": or "shall say, Elohai"(= "my God"), summing up the whole relation between the creature and the Creator. When God called them His people by His grace, then the prophet states they should obey His call, and surrender themselves to Him to own an exclusive relation to God alone.

== See also ==
- Baal
- Egypt
- Jezreel
- Loammi
- Loruhamah
- Related Bible parts: Isaiah 54, Jeremiah 31, Hosea 1

== Sources ==
- Collins, John J. (2014). Introduction to the Hebrew Scriptures. Fortress Press. ISBN 9781451469233.
- Day, John (2007). "27. Hosea". In Barton, John; Muddiman, John (eds.). The Oxford Bible Commentary (first (paperback) ed.). Oxford University Press. pp. 571–578. ISBN 978-0199277186.
- Fitzmyer, Joseph A. (2008). A Guide to the Dead Sea Scrolls and Related Literature. Grand Rapids, MI: William B. Eerdmans Publishing Company. ISBN 9780802862419.
- Hayes, Christine (2015). Introduction to the Bible. Yale University Press. ISBN 978-0300188271.
- Ulrich, Eugene, ed. (2010). The Biblical Qumran Scrolls: Transcriptions and Textual Variants. Brill.
- Würthwein, Ernst (1995). The Text of the Old Testament. Translated by Rhodes, Erroll F. Grand Rapids, MI: Wm. B. Eerdmans. ISBN 0-8028-0788-7.
