= Hosea 1 =

- ← Daniel 12 chapter 2 →
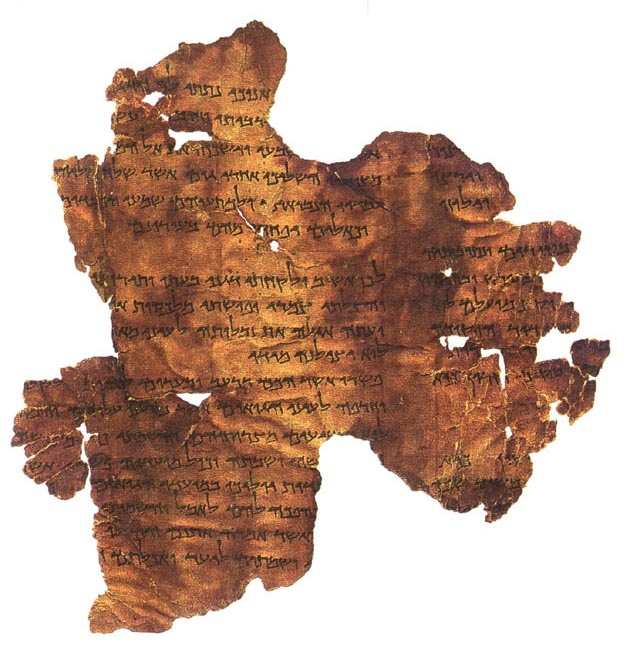
- 4Q166 "The Hosea Commentary Scroll", late first century B.C.
- Book: Book of Hosea
- Category: Nevi'im
- Christian Bible part: Old Testament
- Order in the Christian part: 28

Hosea 1 is the first chapter of the Book of Hosea in the Hebrew Bible or the Old Testament of the Christian Bible. This book contains the prophecies attributed to the prophet Hosea, son of Beeri, and this chapter especially sets forth the spiritual whoredom of Israel by symbolical acts. It is a part of the Book of the Twelve Minor Prophets.

== Text ==
The original text was written in Hebrew. This chapter is divided into 11 verses in English Bibles, but in Hebrew Bibles verses 10 and 11 appear in chapter 2. This article generally follows the common numbering in Christian English Bible versions, with notes to the numbering in Hebrew Bible versions.

Some early manuscripts containing the text of this chapter in Hebrew are of the Masoretic Text tradition, which include the Codex Cairensis (895), the Petersburg Codex of the Prophets (916), Aleppo Codex (10th century), Codex Leningradensis (1008). Fragments containing parts of this chapter were found among the Dead Sea Scrolls, including 4Q79 (4QXII^{d}; 75–50 BCE) with extant verses 6–11 (verses 1:6-9, 2:1-5 in the Hebrew Bible), and 4Q82 (4QXII^{g}; 25 BCE) with extant verses 10–11 (verses 2:1-2 in Hebrew Bible).

There is also a translation into Koine Greek known as the Septuagint, made in the last few centuries BCE. Extant ancient manuscripts of the Septuagint version include Codex Vaticanus (B; $\mathfrak{G}$^{B}; 4th century), Codex Alexandrinus (A; $\mathfrak{G}$^{A}; 5th century) and Codex Marchalianus (Q; $\mathfrak{G}$^{Q}; 6th century). (Note: The Book of Hosea is missing from the extant Codex Sinaiticus.) Chapter 1 has 11 verses in the Septuagint.

== Structure ==
NKJV groups this chapter into:

- Hosea 1:1 = Title
- Hosea 1:2–9 = The Family of Hosea
- Hosea 1:10–11 = The Restoration of Israel

== Superscription (1:1) ==
The word of the Lord that came unto Hosea, the son of Beeri,

in the days of Uzziah, Jotham, Ahaz, and Hezekiah, kings of Judah,
and in the days of Jeroboam the son of Joash, king of Israel.

- "Hosea": means "salvation" or "deliverance"; also "savior" or "deliverer". Adding the prefix "Yah" ("Jah"), implying the name of "Yahweh", the name becomes "Joshua". The original form of the name is closely related to "Hosanna" (hoshia na) or "save now" (cf. Psalm 118:25).
- "In the days of Uzziah": Hosea marks his prophecy by the reigns of the kings of Judah, not of the northern Israel where he lived, because he apparently only regarded the kingdom of Judah as legitimate, bearing the promises of God to the line of David. as Elisha, who was active before Hosea, turned away from Jehoram (2 Kings 3:13–14), and acknowledged only Jehoshaphat king of Judah. The name of Jeroboam may be mentioned as the last king of Israel whom God helped, due to His promise to Jehu, as well as to indicate that God never left the kingdom of Israel without ample warning, since the time of Jeroboam I, who was warned by an unnamed prophet, who supported his prophecy by his own untimely death (1 Kings 13), also by Ahijah (1 Kings 14), then Baasha was warned by Jehu son of Hanani (1 Kings 16), Ahab by Elijah and Micaiah son of Imlah, Ahaziah by Elijah (2 Kings 1); Jehoram by Elisha who was active until the reign of Joash (2 Kings 13:14).
- "Jeroboam": this is Jeroboam II, who died in the fifteenth year of Uzziah's forty-one years' reign. After his reign, all the remaining Israel's kings worshipped false gods: Zachariah (2 Kings 15:9), Menahem (2 Kings 15:18), Pekahiah (2 Kings 15:24), Pekah (2 Kings 15:28), and finally, Hoshea (2 Kings 17:2). Israel was externally most flourishing under this Jeroboam II, who recovered Israel's possessions from the Syrians, as prophesied by the prophet Jonah—by God's mercy to Israel, not for the king's own merit—so that "the coast of Israel was restored from the entering of Hamath to the sea of the plain" (2 Kings 14:23-27).

The activities of Hosea was mainly in the second half of the 8th century BCE, from the reign of Jeroboam (c. 787-747 BCE; the last year of Jeroboam coincides with the 15th of Uzziah) to the reign of Hoshea (c. 731-722 BCE) in the northern kingdom of Israel, which may coincide with the first year of Hezekiah (of the Kingdom of Judah), for about 69 years, (Note: The calculation of the time comprises Jeroboam's reign of 41 years, and in the 27th of his reign began Uzziah or Azariah to reign over destruction of the ten tribes by Shalmaneser, which he prophesied.) Despite reigning earlier than most king's of Judah listed here, Jeroboam king of Israel is mentioned last, because Hosea's prophecy starts in Jeroboam's reign and mainly against the kingdom of Israel. Apparently Hosea was contemporary with the prophets Isaiah (cf. Isaiah 1:1), Amos, and Micah, as well as Lycurgus the lawgiver of the Lacedemonians, and Hesiod the Greek poet. During Hosea's lifetime, the city of Rome began to be built.

== The children of Hosea's marriage with Gomer (1:2–9) ==
This part records the account of Hosea marrying Gomer and having three children 'bearing sign-names of judgement for Israel'.

=== Verse 2 ===
The beginning of the word of the Lord by Hosea.
And the Lord said to Hosea,

Go, take unto thee a wife of whoredoms and children of whoredoms:
for the land hath committed great whoredom, departing from the Lord.

- "Whoredom": or "harlotry", "spiritual adultery". This description of Hosea's family members, especially his wife, is considered proleptic, describing her future behavior.

=== Verse 3 ===
So he went and took Gomer the daughter of Diblaim, and she conceived and bore him a son.

- "Gomer the daughter of Diblaim": The fact that both names don't have apparent symbolic significance gives a support that the people mentioned in the book may really exist in history and the account of Hosea's marriage is not just allegorical or visionary.

https://en.wikipedia.org/w/index.php?title=Hosea_1&action=info

=== Verse 4 ===
And the Lord said unto him, Call his name Jezreel;

for yet a little while, and I will avenge the blood of Jezreel upon the house of Jehu,
and will cause to cease the kingdom of the house of Israel.

- "Jezreel": the name of Hosea's first child, the only one explicitly stated to be his child (cf. verses 3, 6, 8), is based on the city of Jezreel, where Jehu killed all living members of Omri's dynasty (2 Kings 9:1–37; 10:1–11) in c. 842 BCE, which is located in the modern city Zer'in.

=== Verse 6 ===
And she conceived again and bore a daughter. Then God said to him:

"Call her name Lo-Ruhamah,

For I will no longer have mercy on the house of Israel,
But I will utterly take them away."

- "Lo-Ruhamah": the name of the second child, a daughter, means 'not pitied', or "no mercy"
- "But I will utterly take them away": or "that I may forgive them at all"

=== Verse 8 ===
Now when she had weaned Lo-Ruhamah, she conceived and bore a son.

- "Had weaned": in Eastern tradition, mothers commonly nursed their children two or three years (2 Maccabees 7:27). The period until weaning of the child (stopping the breastfeeding) symbolizes a certain interval of time, a temporary reprieve, between the earlier chastisement ("no mercy", Lo-Ruhamah), and the next one ("not my people", Lo-Ammi), which was the irreversible final judgment.

=== Verse 9 ===
Then God said:

“Call his name Lo-Ammi,

For you are not My people,
And I will not be your God."

- "Lo-Ammi": the name of the third child (the second son), means 'not my people'.

== Oracle of Salvation: The Reversal of Judgement (1:10–11) ==
The three verses, consisting of Hosea 1:10, 11 and continued to 2:1, reverse the negative meanings of the children's names and apply them to the nation of Israel. The Masoretic Text numbers the verses as 2:1-3.

=== Verse 10 ===
Yet the number of the children of Israel will be as the sand of the sea,

which cannot be measured nor numbered;

And in the place where it was said to them,

"You are not My people,"

there it will be said to them,

“You are the children of the living God.”

- "Cannot be measured nor numbered": The promise of numerous progeny recalls the promises to the patriarchs (Genesis 22:17; 32:12).
- "You are not My people": translated from the Hebrew: lo-ammi, is to be reversed as "you are the children of the living God" (Hebrew: בני אל חי bə-nê ’êl-ḥāy, "sons of Elohim"; cf. Hosea 2:23).

=== Verse 11 ===
Then will the Judahites and the children of Israel be gathered together,

and appoint themselves one head,

and they will come up out of the land,

for great will be the day of Jezreel.

As Yahweh is one, then His chosen people must also be one (cf. Hosea 3:3–4, 8:4, 13:10–11), so the schism of north (Kingdom of Israel-Samaria) and south (Kingdom of Judah) will be healed (cf. Isaiah 11:13, Ezekiel 37:22).

== See also ==
- Ahaz, king of Judah
- Beeri
- Diblaim
- Gomer
- Hezekiah, king of Judah
- Hosea
- Israel
- Jehu, king of Israel
- Jeroboam, king of Israel
- Jerusalem
- Jezreel
- Jotham, king of Judah
- Joash, king of Israel
- Judah
- Loammi
- Loruhamah
- Uzziah, king of Judah
- Related Bible parts: 2 Kings 10, 2 Kings 15

== Sources ==
- Collins, John J. (2014). Introduction to the Hebrew Scriptures. Fortress Press. ISBN 9781451469233.
- Day, John (2007). "27. Hosea". In Barton, John; Muddiman, John (eds.). The Oxford Bible Commentary (first (paperback) ed.). Oxford University Press. pp. 571–578. ISBN 978-0199277186.
- Fitzmyer, Joseph A. (2008). A Guide to the Dead Sea Scrolls and Related Literature. Grand Rapids, MI: William B. Eerdmans Publishing Company. ISBN 9780802862419.
- Hayes, Christine (2015). Introduction to the Bible. Yale University Press. ISBN 978-0300188271.
- Ulrich, Eugene, ed. (2010). The Biblical Qumran Scrolls: Transcriptions and Textual Variants. Brill.
- Würthwein, Ernst (1995). The Text of the Old Testament. Translated by Rhodes, Erroll F. Grand Rapids, MI: Wm. B. Eerdmans. ISBN 0-8028-0788-7.
