= Bride of Christ =

Metaphor for the church in Christian theology

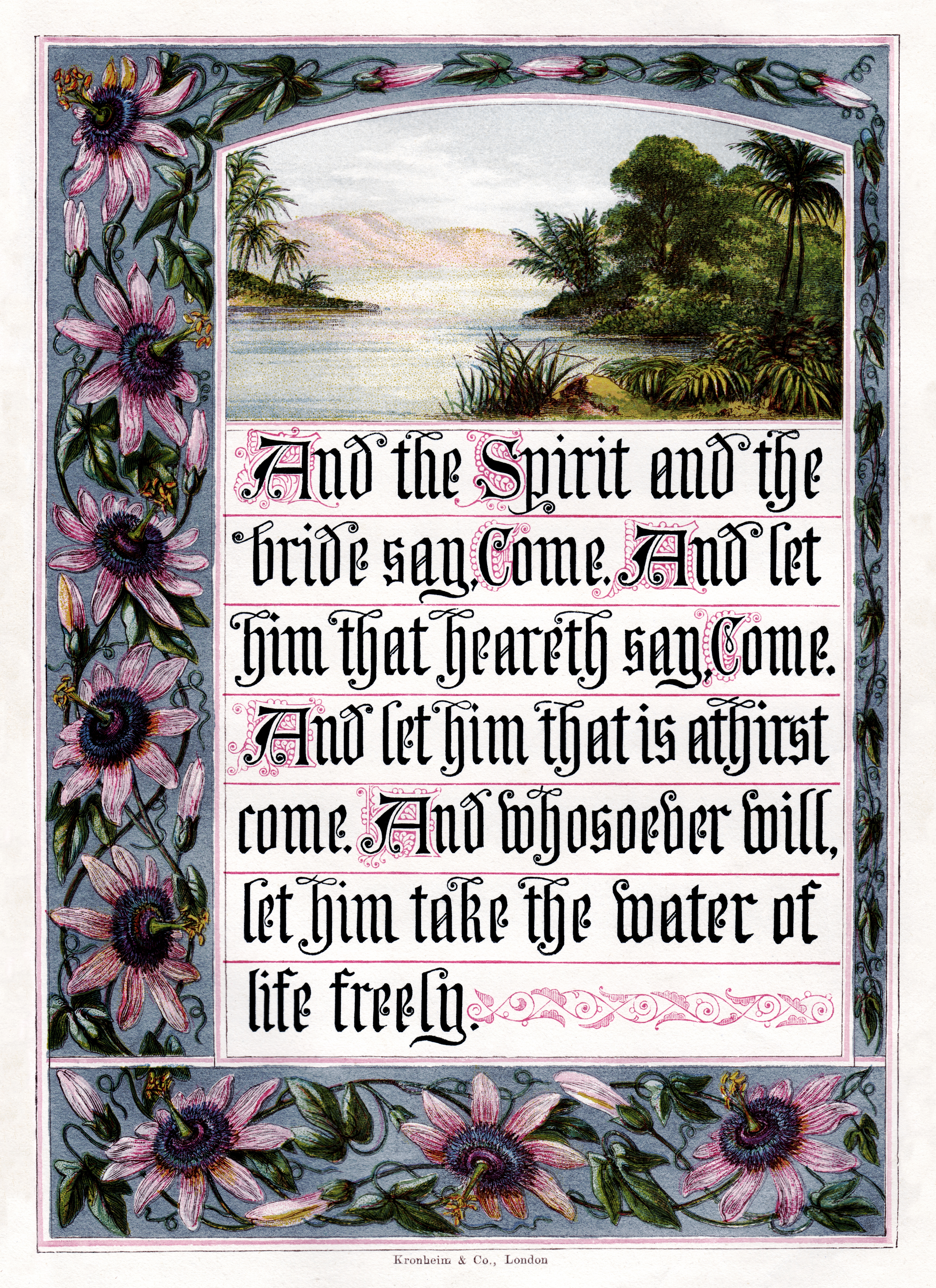
An 1880 Baxter process illustration of Revelation 22:17 by Joseph Martin Kronheim

The bride of Christ, or the lamb's wife, is a metaphor used in a number of related verses in the Christian Bible, specifically the New Testament – in the Gospels, the Book of Revelation, the Epistles, with related verses in the Old Testament.

The identity of the bride is generally considered within Christian theology to be the church, with Jesus as the bridegroom; Ephesians 5:22–33 in particular compares the union of husband and wife to that of Christ and the church. It is a favorite ecclesial image. Interpretations of the metaphor's usage vary from church to church, with most believing that it always refers to the church.

The set of Christian beliefs that use wedding imagery are known as bridal theology. The New Testament often portrays communion with Jesus as a marriage, and God's reign as a wedding banquet. This tradition in turn traces back to the Hebrew Bible, especially allegorical interpretations of the Song of Songs (or Song of Solomon).

In Christianity, bridal theology plays a role in the lives of those who become Catholic, Lutheran and Anglican nuns and religious sisters; for this reason, nuns and religious sisters are often termed "brides of Christ". Additionally, those who dedicate their lives as consecrated virgins live as a "spouse of Christ", spending their lives devoted to serving in the local church and praying for all the faithful (being gifted a breviary after undergoing the rite). Christian women in general have been described as brides of Christ. Bridal theology has influenced the works of, among others, Henry Suso, Catherine of Siena, Teresa of Ávila, Gregory the Great and Bernard of Clairvaux.

== Christ as a bridegroom ==
The Gospel of John speaks of Jesus Christ as the bridegroom and mentions the bride:

He that hath the bride is the bridegroom: but the friend of the bridegroom, which standeth and heareth him, rejoiceth greatly because of the bridegroom's voice: thus my joy therefore is fulfilled.

— John 3:29, King James Version

In the Gospels, when Jesus is asked why his disciples do not fast, but the followers of John the Baptist and the Pharisees do, Jesus answers:

And Jesus said unto them, Can the friends of the bridegroom fast, as long as the bridegroom is with them? but the days will come, when the bridegroom shall be taken from them, and then shall they fast.

— Mark 2:19, King James Version

In Matthew 9:15, Mark 2:19 and Luke 5:34, the Apostles are referred to as the friends, guests, or children – depending on the translation – of the bridegroom commonly accepted to be Jesus Christ.

The bridegroom is also mentioned in the Parable of the Ten Virgins:

Then the kingdom of heaven will be like ten virgins who took their lamps and went out to meet the bridegroom.

— Matthew 25:1–13

== Book of Revelation ==
The Book of Revelation repeatedly mentions the appearance of the Bride:

And I John saw the holy city, new Jerusalem, coming down from God out of heaven, prepared as a bride adorned for her husband. [...] And there came unto me one of the seven angels which had the seven vials full of the seven last plagues, and talked with me, saying, Come hither, I will shew thee the bride, the lamb's wife. And he carried me away in the spirit to a great and high mountain, and shewed me that great city, the holy Jerusalem, descending out of heaven from God

— Revelation 21:2, 9–10, King James Version

In this passage, John, the author of the Revelation, speaks of seeing the bride revealed and refers to her as the New Jerusalem, first mentioned in Revelation 3:12. The bride is mentioned again in Revelation 22:17:

And the Spirit and the bride say, "Come." And let him that heareth say, "Come." And let him that is athirst come. And whosoever will, let him take the water of life freely.

— Revelation 22:17, New International Version

== Comparing the church to a bride ==
In Ephesians 5:22–33, the author compares the union of husband and wife to that of Christ and the church. The central theme of the whole Ephesians letter is reconciliation of the alienated within the unity of the church. Ephesians 5 begins by calling on Christians to imitate God and Christ, who gave himself up for them with love. Verses 1–21 of the same chapter contain a rather strong warning against foolishness and letting down one's guard against evil. Rather, the author encourages the readers to constantly give thanks with song in their hearts because of what God has done for all in Christ. The prelude to the subject's text takes up again the theme of loving submission that began with the example of Christ in Ephesians 5:2: "Be submissive to one another out of reverence for Christ."

The ekklēsia is never explicitly called "the bride of Christ" in the New Testament. That is approached in Ephesians 5:22–33. A major analogy is that of the body. Just as husband and wife are to be "one flesh", this analogy for the writer describes the relationship of Christ and ekklēsia. Husbands were exhorted to love their wives "just as Christ loved the ekklēsia" and gave himself for it. When Christ nourishes and cherishes the ekklēsia, he nourishes and cherishes his own flesh, just as the husband, when he loves his wife, is loving his own flesh. Members of the ekklēsia are "members of his own body", interpreting Genesis 2:24 – "and the two shall become one flesh" – through the lens of the New Testament view of Christ and the church. In Ephesians 5:32, Paul quotes the Genesis passage as what has been called a "divine postscript".

In writing to the Church of Corinth in 2 Corinthians 11, Paul writes to warn the community of false teachers who would teach of another Christ, and to confess his concern that they will believe someone who teaches a false Christ, other than Christ Jesus of Nazareth whom he preached; Paul referred to the Church in Corinth as being espoused to Christ:

For I am jealous over you with godly jealousy: for I have espoused you to one husband, that I may present you as a chaste virgin to Christ. But I fear, lest by any means, as the serpent beguiled Eve through his subtlety, so your minds should be corrupted from the simplicity that is in Christ. For if he that cometh preacheth another Jesus, whom we have not preached, or if ye receive another spirit, which ye have not received, or another gospel, which ye have not accepted, ye might well bear with him.

— 2 Corinthians 11:2–4, King James Version

== Other interpretations ==
=== Consecrated women as brides of Christ ===
While the most commonly accepted interpretation of the bride of Christ is the Church, there are other, uncommon interpretations. A possible alternate interpretation is to regard consecrated virgins and nuns as being brides of Christ, with their taking the propositum as a mystic betrothal to Christ, and their keeping their resolution being faithful to their husband. A notable promoter of that interpretation was Gertrude the Great, a highly influential Christian mystic of the 13th century. It is known that, together with her friend and teacher Mechtilde, Gertrude practiced a spirituality called "nuptial mysticism", and came to see herself as the bride of Christ.

=== Bernard of Clairvaux ===
Bernard of Clairvaux, in his sermons on the Song of Songs, interprets the bride of Christ as the soul and the union thereof as the mystical union of the soul with Christ.

=== Brautmystik ===
Brautmystik (IPA /'brautˌmystik/), literally 'bride-mysticism', often rendered 'bridal mysticism' or 'nuptial mysticism' in English, was a thirteenth-century Christian spiritual movement associated with the Low Countries.

It is particularly associated with Beatrice of Nazareth (d. 1268) and Hadewijch of Antwerp (fl. c. 1250). The movement drew inspiration from the thought of Bernard of Clairvaux, particularly his thinking on the imagery of the Canticle. It was a form of affective piety. It is often associated with the more intellectual, speculative movement, Wesenmystik.

== Old Testament ==
The earliest Christian tradition identifies texts from the Hebrew Bible as symbolic of the divine love of God and people. The love poems of the Song of Songs and the latter prophet Hosea have many references to an intimate, spousal relationship between God and his people. The prophet Hosea notes his bride in chapter 2, verses 16 and following. The theme of bridal love is central in the dramatic marriage of Hosea (Hosea 1:2).

== Analogous concepts ==
A similar concept existed in Valentinian Gnosticism with the notion of the Bridal Chamber, which involved a marriage to one's heavenly counterpart. Some mystics take this "marriage" as a symbol of the union of the human soul with God.

== See also ==
- Parable of the Ten Virgins
- Consecrated virgin
- Ecce homo in Eastern Orthodoxy
- Christian headcovering
- Mystic marriage of Saint Catherine
- Spirit spouse
- Syneisaktism - the Christian ascetic practice of "spiritual marriage"
