= Agapetae =

Consecrated virgins in the 1st century

In the 1st century AD, the Agapetae (from the Greek word ἀγαπηταί (agapetai), meaning 'beloved') were virgins who consecrated themselves to God with a vow of chastity and associated with laymen.

The practice was also known as Syneisaktism (spiritual marriage).

Agapetae were mainly women, although men who lived the same kind of life with deaconesses were named Agapeti (ἀγαπητοί). The term is related to the Greek word ‘agape’, meaning selfless and unconditional love.

== Background ==
The concept was taken from the Bible, and agapetae are mentioned in the Song of Solomon, almost 1000 years before Jesus. In the early Church, virginity was seen as a positive way of life for many Christians, as marriage was seen as promoting evil, quarrels, and the road to sin and suffering. In the Bible, St Paul had promoted staying single in his writings. Spiritual marriages were seen as an alternative way of life, where a man and a woman could have an equal relationship which was emotionally and spiritually intimate. It was also a practical answer to the financial question of how single women could support themselves.

== Controversy ==
This association later resulted in abuses and scandals, so that councils of the fourth century forbade it. The Synod of Elvira in 305 called for clergy to refrain from living with women unless they were related. The Council of Ancyra, in 314, forbade virgins consecrated to God to live thus with men as sisters. This did not correct the practice entirely, and one hundred years later St. Jerome arraigned Syrian monks for living in cities with Christian virgins.

The Agapetae are sometimes confounded with the subintroductae, or woman who lived with clerics without marriage, a class against which the third canon of the First Council of Nicaea (325) was directed. The practice of clerics living with unrelated women was finally condemned by the First and Second Lateran Councils in the 12th century.

The Agapetae were also a branch of the Gnostics in the late 4th century, who held that sexual relations were only improper if the mind was impure. They taught that one should perjure himself rather than reveal the secrets of his sect.

== See also ==
- Evangelical counsels
- Josephite marriage
- Adamites
- Cainites
