= Gomer (wife of Hosea) =

Beloved adulterous wife of prophet Hosea

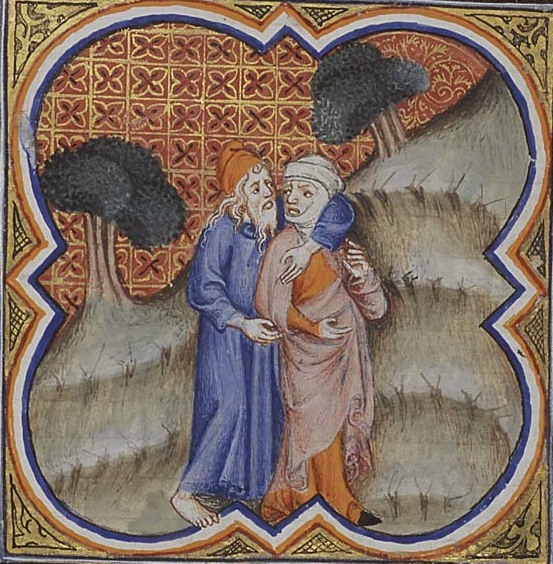
Illustration of Hosea and Gomer from the Bible Historiale, 1372

Gomer (Hebrew: גומר, romanized: Gōmer) was the wife of the prophet Hosea (8th century BC), mentioned in the Hebrew Bible's Book of Hosea (1:3). English translations of Hosea 1:2 refer to her alternatively as a "promiscuous woman" (NIV), a "harlot" (NASB), and a "whore" (KJV) but Hosea is told to marry her according to Divine appointment. She is also described as the daughter of Diblaim.

== Children ==
Hosea 1 relates how Hosea has three children, a son called Jezreel, a daughter Lo-Ruhamah and another son Lo-Ammi. All the names are described in the text as having symbolic meaning, reflecting the relationship between God and Israel. Jezreel is named after the valley of that name. Lo-Ruhamah is named to denote the ruined condition of the kingdom of Israel and Lo-Ammi is named in token of God's rejection of his people. Although the latter two children are not specifically said to be Hosea's, James Mays says that this is "hardly an implication" of Gomer's adultery. In Hosea 3:1, however, it says that she is "loved by another man and is an adulteress" (NIV). Hosea is told to buy her back, and he does so for 15 shekels and a quantity of barley.

== Cultural references ==
- In the 1969 film The Milky Way by Luis Buñuel, the two protagonists encounter a man in a black cape who tells them to sleep with a prostitute, have children with her and name them "Ye Are Not My People" and "No More Mercy". Afterwards they meet a prostitute who wants to become pregnant and gives the same names for the children as those predicted by the man in the cape.
- Brooke Fraser has a song called "Hosea's Wife" in her album Albertine.
- Third Day has a song called "Gomer's Theme" on their album Conspiracy No. 5, which is the source of their fans calling themselves "Gomers."
- Francine Rivers' 1991 novel Redeeming Love tells the story of a prostitute named Angel in the 1850s American West, based on the story of Gomer.
- Michael Card has a song called "Song Of Gomer" on his album The Word.
- Estonian writer Ain Kalmus' 1950 novel Prophet tells the tragic love story of Gomer and Hosea.
- Mesu Andrews' 2013 novel Love In A Broken Vessel features Gomer as a main character as well as her marriage to Hosea.
- In the film Walk on the Wild Side, character Dove Linkhorn relates the tale of Hosea and Gomer to explain how he will deal with his girlfriend Hallie.
- The 2012 film Amazing Love is a retelling of the Book of Hosea and features Gomer prominently as one of the central characters.
