= Consummation =

First sex act as part of a marriage or relationship

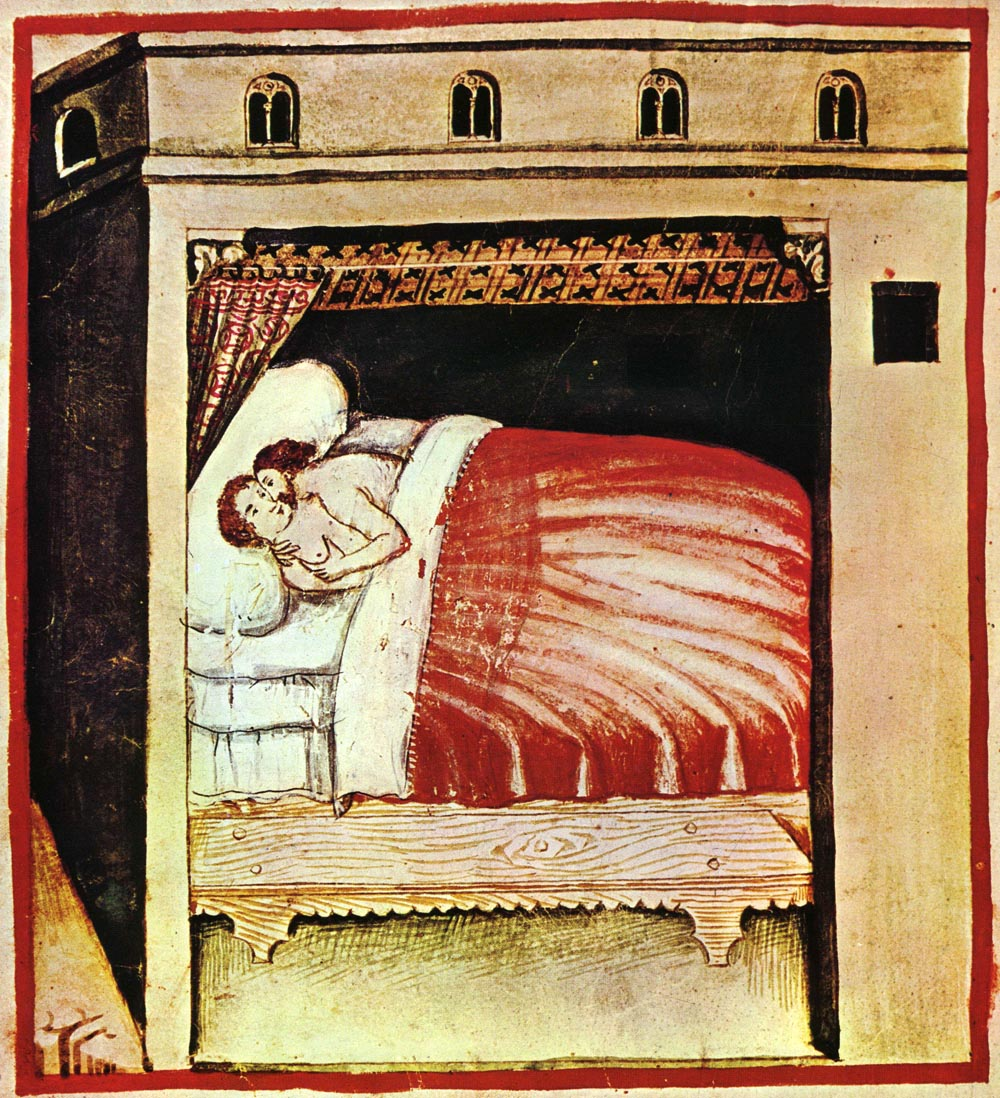
Illustration from Tacuinum Sanitatis, a medieval handbook by Ibn Butlan on health and wellness

The consummation of a marriage, or simply consummation, is the first officially credited act of sexual intercourse following marriage. In many traditions and statutes of civil or religious law, the definition usually refers to penile–vaginal penetration (i.e., heterosexual), and some religious doctrines hold an additional requirement prohibiting contraception. In this sense, "a marriage is consummated only if the conjugal act performed deposits semen in the vagina."

The religious, cultural, or legal significance of consummation may arise from theories of marriage as having the purpose of producing legally recognized descendants of both partners, or of providing sanction to their sexual acts together, or both, and its absence may amount to treating a marriage ceremony as falling short of completing the state of being married, or as creating a marriage which may later be repudiated. Thus, in some legal systems, a marriage may be annulled if it has not been consummated. Consummation is also relevant in the case of a common-law marriage. The historical importance of consummation has resulted in the development of various bedding rituals.

In addition to these formal and literal usages, the term also exists in informal and less precise usage to refer to a sexual landmark in relationships of varying intensity and duration.

== Legislation ==
=== Civil marriage ===
The relevance of consummation in a civil marriage varies by jurisdiction. For example, under section 12 of the Matrimonial Causes Act 1973, a refusal or inability to consummate a marriage is a ground of annulment in England and Wales, but this only applies to heterosexual marriage because Paragraph 4 of schedule 4 of the Marriage (Same Sex Couples) Act 2013 specifically excludes non-consummation as a ground for the annulment of a same-sex marriage. Other common law jurisdictions, such as Australia, have abolished the legal concept of consummation.

In some countries, such as Egypt, Syria, Jordan, the United Arab Emirates, Saudi Arabia, Yemen, Libya, Mauritania, and Indonesia, religious marriage is the only legally binding marriage. In other countries, a religious marriage without civil registration may or may not be legally binding.

=== Common law marriage ===
In the case of common law marriage, consummation may be a required component in the creation of the marriage itself.

=== Religious marriage ===
According to certain Christian theological interpretations, "It is intended by God for the husband to be the one to break his wife's hymen", which when perforated during intercourse creates a blood covenant that seals the bond of holy matrimony between husband and wife. Consummation is particularly relevant in a Catholic marriage. Within the Catholic Church, if a matrimonial celebration takes place (ratification) but the spouses have not yet engaged in intercourse (consummation), then the marriage is said to be a marriage ratum sed non consummatum. Such a marriage, regardless of the reason for non-consummation, can be dissolved by the pope. Additionally, an inability or an intentional refusal to consummate the marriage is probable grounds for an annulment. Catholic canon law defines a marriage as consummated when the "spouses have performed between themselves in a human fashion a conjugal act which is suitable in itself for the procreation of offspring, to which marriage is ordered by its nature and by which the spouses become one flesh". Thus some theologians, such as Fr. John A. Hardon, S.J., state that intercourse with contraception does not consummate a marriage.

== Virginity ==
In many traditions, consummation is an important act because it suggests the bride's virginity; the presence of blood is erroneously taken as definitive confirmation that the woman was a virgin.

== Controversies ==
In the family law defining civil marriage in some jurisdictions, particularly those where the civil marriage laws remain influenced by religion (albeit they are officially secular), non-consummation of a marriage may be a ground for annulment (an annulment is different from a divorce because it usually acts retrospectively). This stipulation has been in recent years heavily criticized on a wide variety of grounds, ranging from the mixing of religious doctrine into secular law, to being degrading to women given its negative historical connotations of ownership of the wife. It has been argued that the purpose of this ground is not clear: it is neither procreation (the act need not end in pregnancy, and neither is there a need of the possibility of it, given the fact the consummation is legally valid even if one or both parties is sterile), neither is it the expectation of sexual satisfaction in marriage (one single act of sexual intercourse is sufficient, even if the spouse following the consummation says they will never again engage in intercourse). Andrew Bainham argues that this law (in England and Wales) is outdated and must be abolished "in a modern society committed to equality and human rights in personal relationships".

In a 2001 report, the Law Society of Ireland's Law Reform advocated abolishing the concept of a voidable marriage altogether (since divorce had been introduced in 1996) and criticized the consummation ground, writing the following:

The rationale behind this ground is not immediately apparent. It is not concerned with the capacity of either or both parties to procreate, still less with the ability of the parties to satisfy each other sexually during the marriage. [...] It remains a rather curious anomaly in the law, a relic perhaps of medieval times, when the first act of intercourse was thought to 'mark' a new bride as the 'property' of her husband. Whatever its origins, it is not entirely clear what modern purpose this ground serves and it is suggested that it should be dispensed with.

Another concern is sexual violence, especially since in most countries the criminalization of marital rape is recent, having occurred from the 1970s onwards; the maintaining in law of the concept of consummation is argued to foster cultural and societal attitudes and understandings of marriage that make it more difficult to acknowledge these violations; and to be a remainder of an oppressive tradition. Commenting on the case of R v R, which criminalised marital rape in England and Wales, Harris-Short and Miles write:

[A] historical view again throws useful light on the matter: until 1991, husbands were permitted to have sexual intercourse with their wives regardless of whether they were then actually consenting, the original act of consummation and the resultant marital status entitling the husband to sexual relations thereafter.

== See also ==
- Nullity (conflict)
- Sexless marriage
- Nishekam
