= Sexless marriage =

Marital union with little or no sexual activity between the spouses

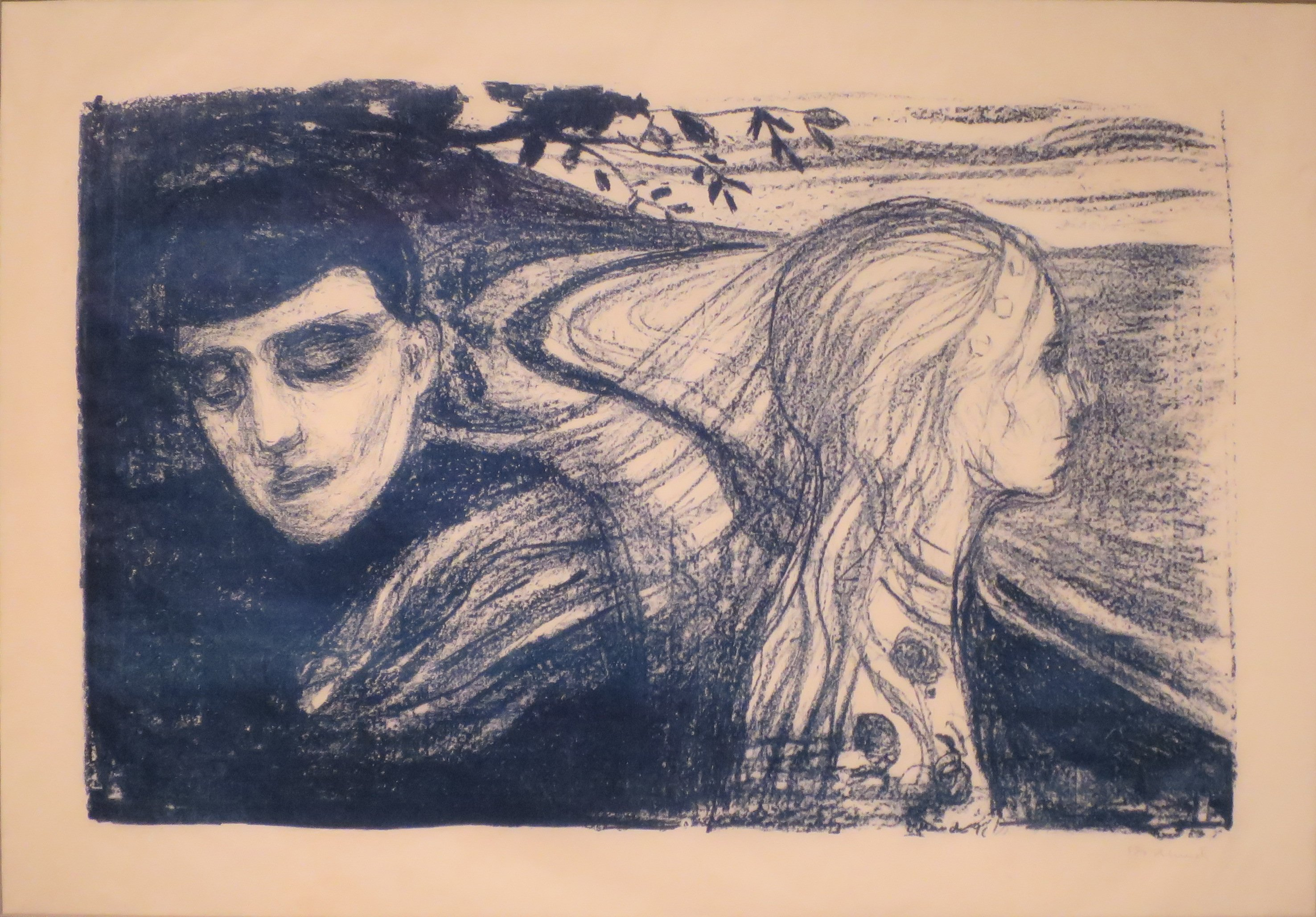
This 1896 Edvard Munch lithograph depicts a couple who have grown apart.

Sexless marriage or platonic marriage is a marital union that occurs between spouses in which there is little or no sexual activity involved in their relationship. The most common cause of a decline in sexual frequency is aging, followed by marital unhappiness.

Having children, sexual boredom, busy work schedules, and spousal infidelity are all factors that can lead to a sexless marriage. Marriage in some cultures culminates in a sexless union for cultural, religious, or political reasons.

== Factors ==
Sexless marriages can develop over time from a range of possible factors. Aging is overwhelmingly the most common cause of sexless marriage, for men and women, largely because of the inability to engage in sexual intercourse due to health status, decreased sex drive, lower energy levels, and other age-related physical changes. Infidelity can result in sexlessness in marriage because of reduced sexual interest in a partner or animosity toward an unfaithful spouse.

Varying work schedules and busy lives may contribute to sexual inactivity in some couples. For couples with children, especially young children, the demands of childbirth and child-rearing can lead to stress, exhaustion, and decreased opportunities for sexual interactions. Also, the frequency of intercourse tends to diminish over time, especially after 1–2 years of marriage. Habituation can also be an important factor. When sex takes place with the same person in the same way over time, novelty and interest can be lost and routine may predominate.

Sexual aversion, a low level of sexual desire, avoidance of sexual situations, or fear of sex, includes past trauma, a lack of sexual vitality due to age, incompatible sexual orientations, or one spouse losing interest in the other, potentially leads to a marriage that is sexually compromised. Mutually agreed upon abstinence from sex based on religious principles, avoidance of sexually transmitted infections, platonic friendship, or preventing conception may all be contributing factors to a relationship without a sexual connection. Further, if one or both partners are asexual, a sexless marriage can result.

Some couples may be married solely for legal purposes or tax benefits, i.e., what is colloquially called a marriage of convenience. For example, in the US a spouse is entitled to a Green Card if married to an American citizen or permanent resident. Another reason for a marriage of convenience is the lavender marriage, which conceals the homosexual/homoromantic or bisexual/biromantic orientation of one or both spouses.

Regardless of the reason sex declines, couples adapt to a lower level of sexual interaction, creating a new normal with each diminution, such that less and less sex may occur over the life span of the marriage.

== A cultural perspective ==
Sex is considered key to marital happiness, however, in some cultures, sex is not considered an integral component of relationship satisfaction. Because approximately 60% of marriages worldwide are arranged, in many cultures around the globe potential partners meet for the first time on the day of the wedding. Traditionally, there has been no prior sexual contact with a prospective spouse before the ceremony.

There are marked variations in sexual frequency across cultures. For example, in parts of Asia, sexual interactions are significantly less than in the Western world. Complete abstinence from sex is common in India for women after the age of 50, particularly if a daughter marries or if she becomes a grandmother. Sexually active French couples had sex 141 times in a 365-day period, British couples 112 times, Americans 138 times, with Hong Kong having the lowest sexual frequency at 57 times a year, according to one survey.

One commonality across cultures is decreased sexual frequency with age. Older adults in Israel were found to refrain from sex for multiple reasons, among them body image and performance anxiety. The beliefs that sexual attractiveness diminishes with age in Israeli women, and fear of failing during sexual performance brings about humiliation for Israeli men, are partially responsible for decreased frequency or cessation of sexual engagement.

In Japan's past, under Japanese Imperialism, sexual desire was considered a man's domain, and sex outside the bonds of marriage was acceptable and expected, especially with prostitutes in a licensed prostitution system. Women, on the other hand, were believed not to possess sexual desire and were relegated to sex for procreation only. The term ″mendokusai″ means hassle in Japanese and was how Japanese women viewed sex during this period.

During the post-war period in the 1950s, Japanese women began to work outside the home for the first time, but were still considered mere domestics regardless of their occupation. Women began to protest men as their masters in a patriarchal, androcentric society and their status as domestics, choosing instead to resist sexual activity, rendering their marriages sexless as a form of political resistance to foster change in Japan's male-dominated culture. Today, young, highly educated working women are postponing marriage thereby delaying entering into these institutional norms.

Chinese culture is very conservative, especially among older adults in terms of openly discussing sexual matters. In Hong Kong, sexless marriages are prevalent, particularly in urban Chinese married couples across all age groups from 25–59 years. Sexlessness among married Chinese women was more attributable to psychosocial factors such as lower spousal relationship satisfaction. For Chinese men, marital sexual inactivity was more attributable to a lack of interest in sex, extramarital relationships, or a low libido on the upper end of the age scale. Because divorce is disapproved of in Chinese society, only a 2.7% divorce rate indicates that a large portion of married Chinese couples remain in sexless marriages despite poor spousal relationships.

== Religion ==
Gnosticism is an ancient religious movement that views the physical world as corrupt and evil because of the desires of the flesh. Gnostic philosophy is rooted in a belief that spiritual knowledge, or gnosis, allows one to transcend the inferior physical realm into a higher spiritual one. Some Gnostic sects believed that abstaining from sexual activity would assist individuals in achieving higher spiritual enlightenment and purity, thus aligning more closely with the divine. Consequently, Gnostic traditions encouraged sexless marriage to accomplish this transcendence.

There are seven sacraments or rituals believed to impart divine grace in Catholic doctrine. Three of these sacraments: Holy Communion (the Eucharist), Holy Matrimony (marriage), and Reconciliation (confession), are intertwined in a circumstance involving sexless marriage. The Catholic Church does not recognize common-law marriage. It is considered a mortal sin, a gravely sinful act that can lead to damnation. If a Catholic lives with a partner but would like to partake of communion, they must reconcile or confess their sins to the church, and either dissolve the common-law marriage and live apart, or formally agree to live as brother and sister in a sexless relationship, entirely abstaining from sexual relations. Only then are they allowed to take communion.

Jainism, an Indian religion, practices self-effort toward enlightenment, divine consciousness, and liberation from repeated lives through reincarnation. As a part of this philosophy, sexless living is practiced by monks, nuns, and secular practitioners, male and female, married and single. Married Jains must give up sex, if possible, after the birth of the firstborn son. The husband, referred to as the householder, must be content with his wife despite this and must view all other women as his mothers, daughters, and sisters. Jains must avoid anything sexually stimulating to maintain clear thoughts unencumbered by sexual passions.

== Statistical overview ==
Sex is a complex, multifaceted, and largely private human experience, and as such, studies of marital sexual inactivity vary. The US National Health and Social Life Survey in 1992 found that 2% of married respondents aged 18 to 59 reported no sexual intimacy in the past year. Comparatively, 92% of married respondents aged 65 to 80 reported no sexual intimacy in the past year.

The definition of a nonsexual marriage is often expanded to sexual intimacy fewer than 10 times per year, in which case the NHSL survey would include 20% of the couples. Other studies show that 10% or less of the married population below age 50 have not had sex in the past year. In addition less than 20% report having sex a few times per year, or even monthly, under the age 40.

Among older adults in the US, a sharp decline in marital sexual frequency is reported after the age of 50. For ages 50–54, 83% of couples are sexually active. For 65- to 69-year-olds, marital sexual frequency is 57%. For 75 years and older, 27% of couples are engaging in sex.

== See also ==
- Mariage blanc, a marriage without consummation.
- Josephite marriage, a marriage sexless out of religious motivation.
- Marriage of convenience, a marriage for reasons other than love and commitment.
- Lavender marriage, a marriage concealing discriminated sexual orientation.
- Lesbian bed death, the concept that committed relationships between women have less sex the longer the relationship lasts.
