= Isaiah 54 =

Book of Isaiah, chapter 54

- ← chapter 53 chapter 55 →
- The Great Isaiah Scroll, the best preserved of the biblical scrolls found at Qumran from the second century BC, contains all the verses in this chapter.
- Book: Book of Isaiah
- Hebrew Bible part: Nevi'im
- Order in the Hebrew part: 5
- Category: Latter Prophets
- Christian Bible part: Old Testament
- Order in the Christian part: 23

Isaiah 54 is the fifty-fourth chapter of the Book of Isaiah in both the Hebrew Bible and the Old Testament of the Christian Bible. This book contains the prophecies attributed to the prophet Isaiah, and is one of the Books of the Prophets. Chapters 40-55 are known as "Deutero-Isaiah" and date from the time of the Israelites' exile in Babylon.

== Text ==
The original text was written in Hebrew language. This chapter is divided into 17 verses.

=== Textual witnesses ===
Some early manuscripts containing the text of this chapter in Hebrew are of the Masoretic Text tradition, which includes the Codex Cairensis (895), the Petersburg Codex of the Prophets (916), Aleppo Codex (10th century), Codex Leningradensis (1008).

Fragments containing parts of this chapter were found among the Dead Sea Scrolls (3rd century BC or later):

- 1QIsa^{a}: complete
- 1QIsa^{b}: extant verses 1–6
- 4QIsa^{c} (4Q57): extant verses 3–17
- 4QIsa^{d} (4Q58): extant verses 1–11
- 4QIsa^{q} (4Q69^{a}): extant verses 11–13

There is also a translation into Koine Greek known as the Septuagint, made in the last few centuries BCE. Extant ancient manuscripts of the Septuagint version include Codex Vaticanus (B; $\mathfrak{G}$^{B}; 4th century), Codex Sinaiticus (S; BHK: $\mathfrak{G}$^{S}; 4th century), Codex Alexandrinus (A; $\mathfrak{G}$^{A}; 5th century) and Codex Marchalianus (Q; $\mathfrak{G}$^{Q}; 6th century).

== Parashot ==
The parashah sections listed here are based on the Aleppo Codex. Isaiah 54 is a part of the Consolations (Isaiah 40–66). {P}: open parashah; {S}: closed parashah.

{P} 54:1-8 {S} 54:9-10 {S} 54:11-17 {S}

== Verse 1 ==
Sing, O barren, thou that didst not bear;

break forth into singing, and cry aloud, thou that didst not travail with child:

for more are the children of the desolate than the children of the married wife,

saith the Lord.

- Cross reference: Isaiah 62:4; Genesis 20:3; Deuteronomy 22:22

Cited in Galatians 4:27 to highlight 'the contrast between the spiritual and the earthly Jerusalem', that is, between 'the church of Christ and the Jewish community'.

== Verse 8 ==
In a little wrath

I hid My face from you for a moment;

but with everlasting kindness

I will have mercy on you,
says the Lord your Redeemer.

- "In a little wrath": from Hebrew בְּשֶׁ֣צֶף קֶ֗צֶף, bə-she-tsep̄ qe-tsep̄, with the 'rhetorical emphasis of rhyme', literally, "in a gush or burst of wrath", which, although terrible at the time, but lasts only for a moment.

== Verse 9 ==
For this is as the waters of Noah to Me;
for as I have sworn that the waters of Noah should no longer cover the earth,
so I have sworn that I would not be wrathful with you nor rebuke you.

Referring to the promise of God to Noah in Genesis 9:11,15

== Verse 10 ==
"For the mountains shall depart
And the hills be removed,
But My kindness shall not depart from you,
Nor shall My covenant of peace be removed,"

Says the Lord, who has mercy on you.

The aftermath of the flood becomes 'the occasion for God to promise the continuance of his steadfast love ("kindness"; Hebrew: chesed) and of peace (Hebrew: shalom)'.

== See also ==
- Blacksmith
- Noah
- Noah's flood
- Related Bible parts: Genesis 9, Galatians 4

== Sources ==
- Coggins, R (2007). "22. Isaiah". In Barton, John; Muddiman, John (eds.). The Oxford Bible Commentary (first (paperback) ed.). Oxford University Press. pp. 433–486. ISBN 978-0199277186.
- Würthwein, Ernst (1995). The Text of the Old Testament. Translated by Rhodes, Erroll F. Grand Rapids, MI: Wm. B. Eerdmans. ISBN 0-8028-0788-7.
