= Yogic marriage =

Tradition of Hindu marriage

Yogic marriage is a tradition of Hindu marriage done within Shaivite sadhakas and sadhvis, to enable them to get positive energy from yajnas and homas. Though a sexual relation is not excluded in this form of marriage, it is consummated only in exceptional circumstances. It is the simplest of Hindu marriages, done before Shiva by taking an oath in the name of Shiva and chanting "Omkara Bindu Samyuktam, Nityam Dhyayati Yoginah; Kamadam Mokshadam Chaiva Omkaraya Namo Namaha".
