= Ratum sed non consummatum =

Type of marriage in Catholic canon law

The term ratum sed non consummatum (Latin: ratified but not consummated) or ratum et non consummatum (Latin: ratified and not consummated) refers to a juridical-sacramental category of marriage in Catholic matrimonial canon law. If a matrimonial celebration takes place (ratification) but the spouses have not yet engaged in intercourse (consummation), then the marriage is said to be a marriage ratum sed non consummatum. The Tribunal of the Roman Rota has exclusive competence to dispense from marriages ratorum sed non consummatorum, which can only be granted for a "just reason". This process should not be confused with the process for declaring the nullity of marriage, which is treated of in a separate title of the 1983 Code of Canon Law.

== History ==
Two different theories of marriage were in vogue for some time in the schools of canonical jurists. For Gratian and the school of Bologna, marriage is begun by consent, but it becomes complete, indissoluble, and a sacrament only when it is consummated. For Peter Lombard and the school of Paris, marriage contracted by mutual consent alone is a true and complete marriage, absolutely indissoluble, and, between Christians, a sacrament. This second theory had the support of early Christian writers, received the approval of Sovereign Pontiffs, particularly of Alexander III, and soon prevailed. It was conceded, however, to the first theory that, whilst non-consummated marriage is a complete marriage and a sacrament, yet it is not absolutely indissoluble. This quality belongs fully to the marriage ratified and consummated. Thus mutual consent is sufficient to constitute marriage in its essence; consummation adds an accidental perfection and more absolute indissolubility Absolute indissolubility is attributed only to ratified and consummated marriages between Christians.

=== 1917 Code of Canon Law ===
Canon 1119 of the 1917 Code of Canon Law stipulated two cases in which a marriage ratum sed non consummatum may be dissolved, namely, (1) if one of the parties takes solemn vows in a religious order or (2) a dispensation is issued by the Holy See.

==== Dissolution by solemn religious profession ====
That solemn religious profession dissolves a merely ratified marriage was authoritatively declared by Alexander III (c. 2 and 7, x, iii, 32) and Innocent III (c. 14, x, iii, 32), universally received in practice, after them, and defined by the Council of Trent (Sess. xxiv, De Sacramento Matrimonii, Can. 6). The only question which remained controverted was whether religious profession dissolved marriage by divine, or, as more commonly admitted, by ecclesiastical, right.

== Current discipline under the 1983 Code ==
Under the 1983 Code of Canon Law, the discipline of 1917 has been changed; a marriage ratum sed non consummatum can now be dissolved only by a dispensation from the pope or his delegate. The pope has delegated competency for granting such dispensations to the Tribunal of the Roman Rota, one of the ordinary tribunals of the Apostolic See.

=== Competency for granting dispensation ===
The administrative process for granting the favor of a dispensation from a marriage ratum et non consummatum was formerly the exclusive competence of the Congregation for Divine Worship and the Discipline of the Sacraments under article 58 §2 of the apostolic constitution Pastor Bonus. However, in 2011, Pope Benedict XVI amended Pastor Bonus with the Motu Proprio Quaerit Semper, thereby transferring jurisdiction over ratified and non-consummated marriage from the Congregation for Divine Worship and the Discipline of the Sacraments to a special Office of the Tribunal of the Roman Rota. The new law obrogated the provision stating the 'exclusive competence' of the Congregation for Divine Worship regarding these marriages, for this provision was not expressly abrogated and the Office at the Roman Rota now oversees dispensations from such marriages. Since 1 October 2011 it has been the exclusive competence of the Tribunal of the Roman Rota.

== Dispensation vis-à-vis Declaration of Nullity ==
The favor of dispensation from a marriage ratum sed non consumatum is an inherently administrative procedure, while the process for obtaining a Declaration of Nullity (often misleadingly termed "annulment") is an inherently judicial one. In a ratum the valid marriage bond is dispensed from, while in a Declaration of Nullity a marriage is declared to have been null from its beginning. A ratum ends, for a just reason, a marriage that truly is (although never irrevocably and sacramentally "sealed" by consummation) while a Declaration of Nullity juridically declares that a marriage never truly was in the eyes of Catholic theology and matrimonial law.

== See also ==
- Josephite marriage
