= Spiritual friendship =

Spiritual friendship may refer to:

- Kalyāṇa-mittatā ("spiritual friendship"), a concept in Buddhist community life, applicable to both monastic and householder relationships
- De spirituali amicitiâ ("Spiritual Friendship"), a treatise by Cistercian monk Saint Aelred of Rievaulx, written 1164–67
