= Syneisaktism =

Living arrangement

Syneisaktism, also spelled "syneisactism" (from Ancient Greek συνείσακτος , suneísaktos, “(adjective) introduced together; (noun) participant in syneisaktism”, from συνεισάγω, suneiságō, “to bring in together”, from συν-, sun-, “together” + εἰσάγω, eiságō, “to bring in, introduce), is the practice of "spiritual marriage", which is where a man and a woman who have both taken vows of chastity live together in a chaste and non-legalized partnership. More often than not, the woman would move into the house of the man, and they would live as brother and sister, both committed to the continuation of their vows of chastity. The women who entered into a spiritual marriage were known as subintroductae ("those brought in covertly"), agapetae ("beloved ones"), and syneisaktoi ("those brought into the house together"). This practice emerged around the 2nd century CE, and survived into the Middle Ages, despite being condemned by numerous church leaders, writers, and councils.

== Emergence ==
The practice of asceticism grew in the early years of Christianity due to the teachings of both Paul the Apostle and Jesus Christ, who suggested that a celibate life was the best way to prepare for life in the Kingdom of God. It may have also emerged as an alternative to martyrdom, so that the faithful could reach the Kingdom of Heaven and receive their rewards in the afterlife without giving their lives. It became more and more popular as Christianity became accepted and legalized in the Roman Empire and martyrdoms became less frequent. Virginity became a favoured alternative to earthly marriage, promoted by writers such as Eusebius of Emesa and Jerome, all of whom saw marriage as promoting evil, quarrels, and the road to sin and suffering. Virginity emerged as a popular practice for women around the 2nd century CE, although it became more fully developed during the next couple of centuries, and it became "constructed as a form of liberation not only from the strictures of marriage and childbearing, but also from physical passion and materiality", which were considered sinful and dangerous to the soul.

One issue that many ascetic virgins, especially women, came across was how they were to live once they denounced marriage and earthly pleasures. Some independently wealthy women were able to seclude themselves on their estates, others were supported by family, but many had no means with which to support themselves. Monasteries for women were a later development; in the 2nd century CE there would have been very few in existence. Thus, spiritual marriage may have emerged as a solution to this problem. An ascetic woman would have gone to live with an ascetic man in his house, living as brother and sister in a sort of unofficial marriage. Spiritual marriages would have also offered a rare opportunity for a man and a woman to engage in an emotionally and spiritually intimate friendship, something that was next to unheard of in the ancient world, in which it was believed that men and women could never be friends, as friendship implied parity, and the sexes were not considered equal. Thus, spiritual marriages would have been a desirable option for both ascetic men and women.

== Condemnation ==
Despite the appeal of spiritual marriages, subintroductae and the practice itself were continuously condemned by various councils, writers, and theologians. John 20:17 was one New Testament verse that was used as evidence that spiritual marriage was not endorsed by Christ, as Jesus pushes away Mary Magdelene with the command "touch me not". Various other authorities and texts were used, with writers building upon earlier arguments in response to the flourishing practice.

=== Councils ===
The earliest council to condemn the virgines subintroductae and the practice of spiritual marriage was the Council of Antioch (268), and this stance was reiterated at the Synod of Elvira in 300 (Canon 27: "a bishop or any other clergy may have living with him only a sister or a virgin daughter dedicated to God; by no means shall he keep any woman unrelated to him".), at Ancyra in 317, and at the First Council of Nicaea in 325. Nicaea denounces spiritual marriage in its third canon, which forbids any clergy member from living with a woman unless she is a relative.

Decrees against spiritual marriage and the subintroductae continued to be issued by various authorities all over Europe until the Middle Ages.

=== Writers ===
Church writers and theologians also spoke out against the practice of spiritual marriage, more often than not condemning it. Those who wrote about this subject include Athanasius of Alexandria, Jerome, Eusebius of Emesa, Gregory of Nyssa, and John Chrysostom, among others.

=== Athanasius of Alexandria ===
Athanasius of Alexandria was a fourth century writer who wrote two letters on the subject of virginity. The second letter is addressed to a group of virgins newly returned from a pilgrimage to the Holy Land. He gives advice on how to continue their ascetic lives properly, including a section on spiritual marriage. Here, he condemns the practice of spiritual marriage and of the subintroductae, suggesting that it is a betrayal of the Bridegroom Christ to whom all virgins devote their lives when they take vows of chastity. He mentions those virgins who "dare[d] even to live and mix with men, not considering such a great danger or how easy it is to fall in this life" and goes on to call on women to abandon their practice of spiritual marriage, "lest you break your covenant with the heavenly bridegroom".

=== John Chrysostom ===
John Chrysostom, another fourth-century writer, wrote two treatises on the subject of spiritual marriage, both condemning the practice. He suggests that living together chastely will only intensify lust for one another, as it is never satisfied by sexual intercourse ("sexual desire...serves to still passion and often leads the man to satiation... But with a virgin, nothing of this sort happens...the men who live with them are stirred by a double desire"), and that it was not spiritual love but lust that drew these couples together; like Athanasius, he sees spiritual marriage as a betrayal of Christ the Bridegroom as well. His protests also show the prevailing views of men and women that existed during this time, as his writing suggests that spiritual marriage goes against traditional views of men and women occupying separate spheres.

== See also ==
- Josephite marriage
- Bridal theology
