= Imlah =

Imlah is a surname. Notable people with the surname include:

- David Imlah, Australian curler and coach
- John Imlah (1799–1846), Scottish poet
- Mick Imlah (1956–2009), Scottish poet and editor

== See also ==
- Imla (biblical figure), the father of the Hebrew prophet Micaiah
