= Hosea =

Biblical character

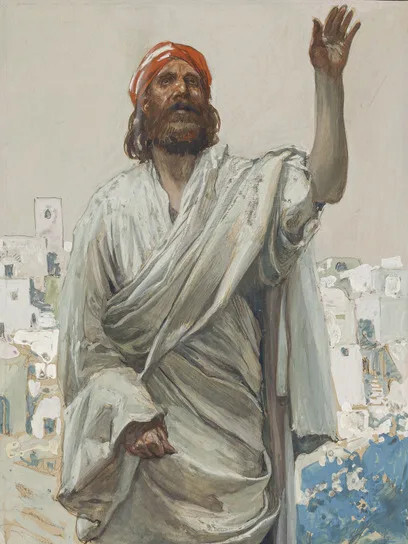
- The Prophet Hosea by James Tissot, c. 1900
- Venerated in: Judaism; Christianity; Islam; Rastafari
- Major shrine: Safed, Israel
- Feast: October 17 (Orthodox Christianity)
- Attributes: raising his hand in benediction, holding a scroll with the words Ex Aegypto vocavi filium meum
- Major works: Book of Hosea

In the Hebrew Bible, Hosea (/hoʊˈziːə/ hoh-ZEE-ə or /hoʊˈzeɪə/ hoh-ZAY-ə; Hebrew: הוֹשֵׁעַ, romanized: Hōšēaʿ, lit. 'Salvation'), also known as Osee (Ancient Greek: Ὡσηέ, romanized: Hōsēé), son of Beeri, was an 8th-century BC prophet in Israel and the nominal primary author of the Book of Hosea. He is the first of the Twelve Minor Prophets, whose collective writings were aggregated and organized into a single book in the Jewish Tanakh by the Second Temple period (forming the last book of the Nevi'im) but which are distinguished as individual books in Christianity. Hosea is often seen as a "prophet of doom", but underneath his message of destruction is a promise of restoration. The Talmud claims that he was the greatest prophet of his generation. The period of Hosea's ministry extended to some sixty years, and he was the only prophet of Israel of his time who left any written prophecy.

Most scholars since the nineteenth and twentieth centuries have agreed on the contemporaneous dating of Hosea and the Book of Hosea to the time of Jeroboam II, although some redaction-critical studies of Hosea since the 1980s have postulated that the theological and literary unity was created by editors, and scholars differ significantly in their interpretations of the redaction process, stages, and the extent of the eighth-century prophet’s original contributions. Nevertheless, aspects of eighth-century history are generally considered to be reflected in the text.

== Name meaning ==
The name Hosea seems to have been common, and is derived from a related verb meaning 'salvation'. Numbers 13:16 states that Hosea was the original name of Joshua, son of Nun until Moses gave him the longer, theophoric name Yehoshua (Hebrew: יְהוֹשֻֽׁעַ, romanized: Yēhōšūaʿ) incorporating an abbreviated form of the Tetragrammaton. Rashi explains in Sotah 34b that Joshua is a compound name of יה (Yah) and הושע (hōšēaʿ), "God may save".

== Location ==
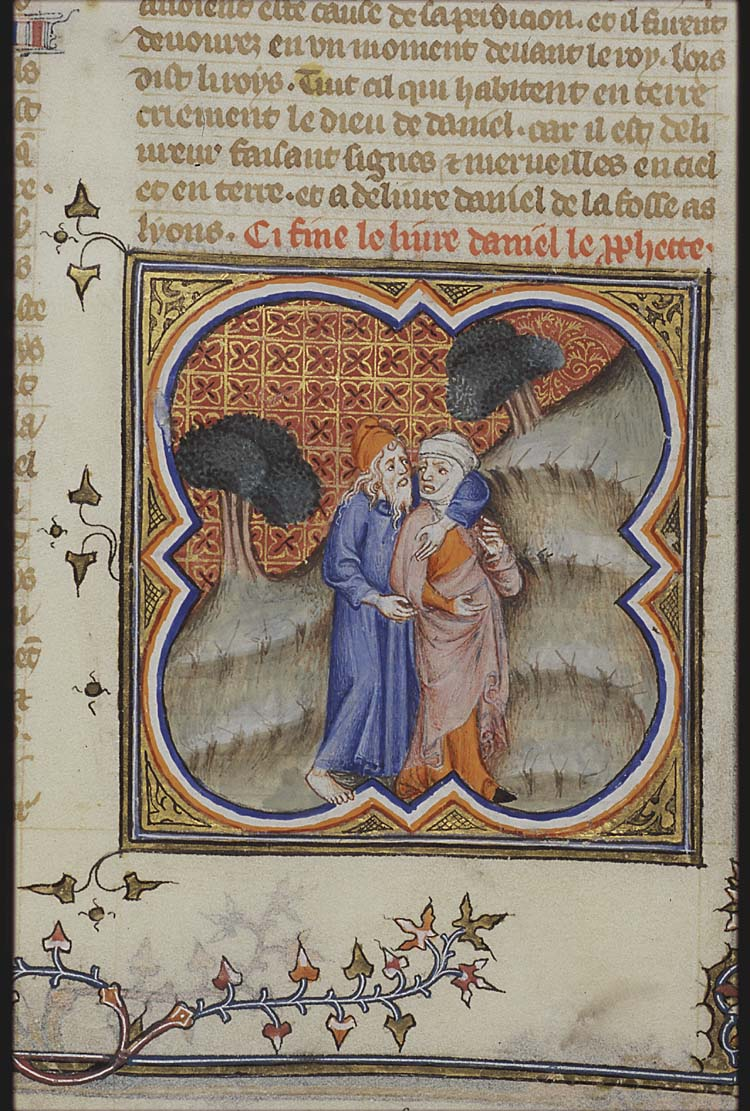
Illustration of Hosea and Gomer from the Bible Historiale, 1372

Although it is not expressly stated in the Book of Hosea, it is apparent from the level of detail and familiarity focused on north-east geography, that Hosea conducted his prophetic ministries in the northern Kingdom of Israel, of which he was a native. In Hosea 5:8 ff., there seems to be a reference to the Syro-Ephraimite War which led to the capture of the kingdom by the Assyrians (c. 734–732 BC). Hosea's long ministry, from the reign of Jeroboam II (787–747) to the reign of Hoshea (731–722), seems to have ended before the fall of Samaria in 722/721.

== Family ==
Little is known about the life or social status of Hosea. According to the Book of Hosea, he married Gomer, the daughter of Diblaim, but she proved to be unfaithful. Hosea knew she would be unfaithful, as God says this to him immediately in the opening statements of the book. This marriage was arranged in order to serve to the prophet as a symbol of Israel's unfaithfulness to the Lord. His marriage will dramatize the breakdown in the relationship between God and his people Israel. Hosea's family life reflected the "adulterous" relationship which Israel had built with other gods.

Similarly, his children's names represent God's estrangement from Israel. They are prophetic of the fall of the ruling dynasty and the severed covenant with God – much like the prophet Isaiah a generation later. The name of Hosea's daughter, Lo-ruhamah, which translates as 'not pitied', is chosen as a sign of displeasure with the people of Israel for following false gods. The name of Hosea's son, Lo-ammi, which translates as 'not my people', is chosen as a sign of the Lord's displeasure with the people of Israel for following those false gods.

== Rabbinic literature ==
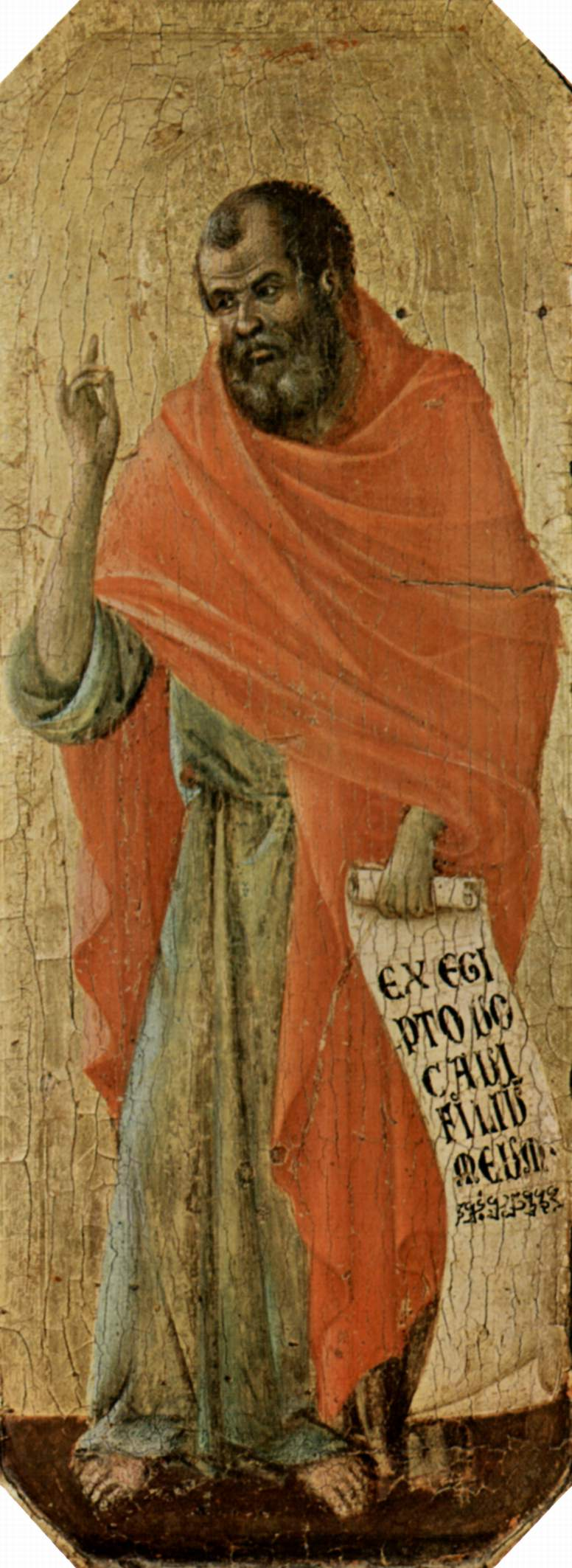
The Prophet Hosea, by Duccio di Buoninsegna, in the Siena Cathedral (c. 1309–1311)

The reign of Uzziah, who for a while occupied the throne during his father Amaziah's lifetime, is notable particularly because it marks the beginning of the activity of three of the prophets Hosea, Amos, and Isaiah. The oldest of the three was Hosea, the son of the prophet and prince Beeri, the Beeri who was later carried away captive by Tiglath-pileser, the King of Assyria. Of Beeri's prophecies there are two verses preserved by Isaiah. The peculiar marriage contracted by Hosea at the command of God was not without a good reason. When God spoke to the prophet about the sins of Israel, expecting him to defend or excuse his people, Hosea said severely: "O Lord of the world! Thine is the universe. In place of Israel choose another as Thy particular people from among the nations of the earth." To make the true relation between God and Israel known to the prophet, he was commanded to take to wife a woman with a dubious past. After she had several children born, God suddenly put the question to him: "Why followest thou not the example of thy teacher Moses, who denied himself the joys of family life after his call to prophecy?" Hosea replied: "I can neither send my wife away nor divorce her, for she has borne me children." "If, now," said God to him, "thou who hast a wife of whose honesty thou art so uncertain that thou canst not even be sure that her children are thine, and yet thou canst not separate from her, how, then can I separate Myself from Israel, from My children, the children of My elect, Abraham, Isaac, and Jacob!" Hosea entreated God to pardon him. But God said: "Better were it that thou shouldst pray for the welfare of Israel, for thou art the cause that I issued three fateful decrees against them." Hosea prayed as he was bidden, and his prayer averted the impending threefold doom. Hosea died at Babylon at a time in which a journey thence to Palestine was beset with many perils. Desirous of having his earthly remains rest in sacred ground, he requested before his death that his bier be loaded upon a camel, and the animal permitted to make its way as it would. Wherever it stopped, there his body was to be buried. As it commanded, so it was done. Without a single mishap the camel arrived at Safed. In the Jewish cemetery of the town it stood still, and there Hosea was buried in the presence of a large concourse."

== Christian thought ==
One of the early writing prophets, Hosea used his own experience as a symbolic representation of God and Israel. The relationship between Hosea and Gomer parallels the relationship between God and Israel. Even though Gomer runs away from Hosea and sleeps with another man, he loves her anyway and forgives her. Likewise, even though the people of Israel worshipped false gods, God continued to love them and did not abandon his covenant with them.

The Book of Hosea was a severe warning to the northern kingdom against the growing idolatry being practiced there; the book was a dramatic call to repentance. Christians extend the analogy of Hosea to Christ and the church: Christ the husband, his church the bride. Christians see in this book a comparable call to the church not to forsake the Lord Jesus Christ. Christians also take the buying back of Gomer as the redemptive qualities of Jesus Christ's sacrifice on the cross.

Other preachers, like Charles Spurgeon, saw Hosea as a striking presentation of the mercy of God in his sermon on Hosea 1:7: "But I will have mercy upon the house of Judah, and will save them by the Lord their God, and will not save them by bow, nor by sword, nor by battle, by horses, nor by horsemen." – Bible, Hosea 1:7

== In Islam ==
Prophet Ḥushayā Alayhi as-Salam
- حشايا; Hosea

Personal life
- Born: c. 8th century BC Kingdom of Israel
- Parent: Biri (father)

Religious life
- Religion: Islam

In Islam, Ḥushayā ibn Bīrī (Arabic: حشايا بن بيري) is considered to be an Israʼiliyyat prophet sent to guide Bani-Israel after they turned away from God. The Qur'an mentions only some prophets by name but makes it clear that many were sent who are not mentioned. Therefore, many Muslim scholars, such as Ibn Ishaq, speak of Hosea as one of the true Hebrew prophets of Israel. The Book of Hosea has also been used in Qur'anic exegesis by Abdullah Yusuf Ali, especially in reference to Qur'anic verses which speak of the backsliding of Israel.

== Observances ==
He is commemorated with the other Minor prophets in the Calendar of saints of the Armenian Apostolic Church on July 31. He is commemorated on the Eastern Orthodox liturgical calendar, with a feast day on October 17 (for those churches which follow the Julian Calendar, October 17 currently falls on October 30 of the modern Gregorian Calendar). He is also commemorated on the Sunday of the Holy Fathers (the Sunday before the Nativity of the Lord).

Several haftarot are taken from Hosea, including those for Vayetze, Bamidbar, Shabbat Shuvah, and (Sephardic only) Tisha B'Av.

== Tomb ==
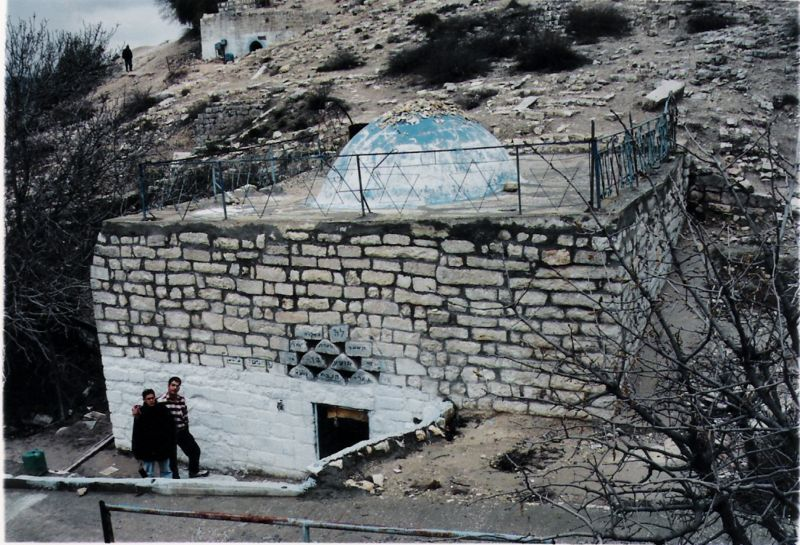
The structure at the cemetery in Safed known as the Tomb of Hosea

Jewish tradition holds that the tomb of Hosea is a structure located in the Jewish cemetery of Safed; however, Emil G. Hirsch and Victor Ryssel, writing in The Jewish Encyclopedia, say that this tradition is "historically worthless".

== In popular culture ==
The character Hosea Matthews in the video game Red Dead Redemption 2 is named after the prophet.

Norman Nicholson's play A Match for the Devil, first performed in 1953, is based on the story of Hosea.

The story of Hosea is retold in a modern-day setting in the film HOSEA (2020), directed by Ryan Daniel Dobson.

Hosea is portrayed by Elijah Alexander in the film Amazing Love: The Story of Hosea (2012).

The novel Redeeming Love (1991) is based on the Book of Hosea.

The book of Hosea is mentioned and paralleled in the National Book Award for Fiction Finalist novel Pachinko by Min Jin Lee.
