= Kingship of Christ =

Kingship of Christ usually refers to Jesus, whom Christians believe to be the Messiah (Christ), as a king. It may refer to:

- The Catholic doctrine of the Social Kingship of Christ
- Intercession of Christ
- Kingly office of Christ
- Millennialism, the belief that Christ will reign on earth for a millennium
- Session of Christ

== See also ==
- Christ the King
- Jesus, King of the Jews
- Kingdom of God (Christianity)
