= Vivaldi's introduzioni =

Motet for solo voice by Antonio Vivaldi

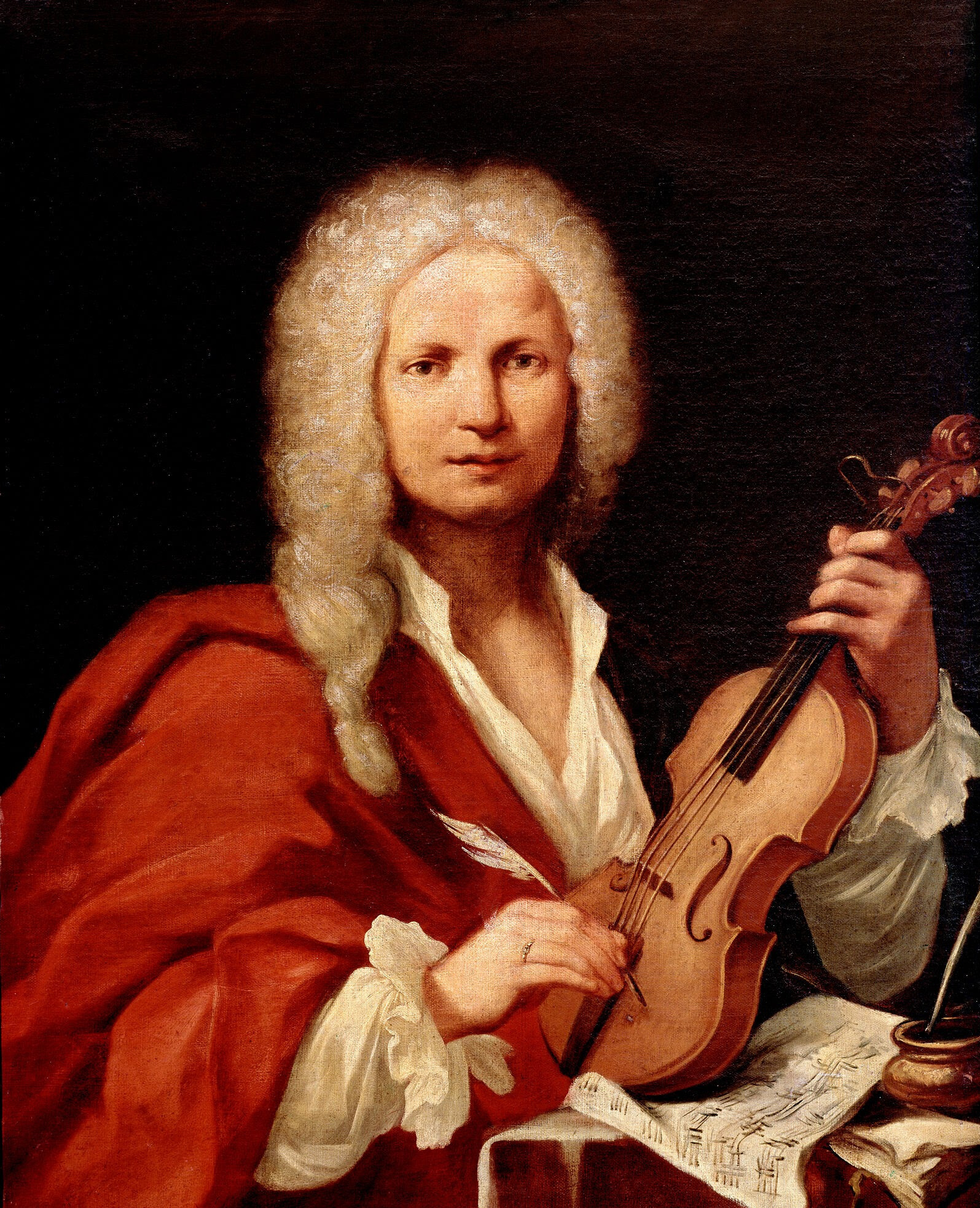
Probable portrait of Antonio Vivaldi, c. 1723

Eight introduzioni by Antonio Vivaldi survive, each in three or four movements. An introduzione is a motet for solo voice intended to be sung before certain choral settings of liturgical texts. The texts of introduzioni are non-liturgical but sometimes paraphrase liturgical texts. In the Ryom Verzeichnis, Vivaldi's introduzioni are numbered from RV 635–642.

== Structure ==
Vivaldi's introduzioni are written for a solo singer, either alto or soprano, accompanied by instruments. The musical structure seems to derive from the text: four of the eight (RV 635, 636, 637, and 642) consist of two arias in da capo form surrounding a central recitative. One (RV 638) has a central aria flanked by two recitatives; another (RV 640) has just two movements – recitative then aria – and a third (RV 641) has four movements (two recitatives, aria, recitative). The remaining one (RV 639) has the structure 'aria-recitative-aria' but Vivaldi interwove the second aria into the first movement of the liturgical work which followed it - the Gloria (RV 588).

== List of Introduzioni ==
All of Vivaldi's introduzioni are ordered here by numeric order according to RV number.

=== Ascende Laeta, RV 635 ===
Ascende Laeta, written for soprano, was intended to precede a setting of the Dixit Dominus in D Major for orchestra and five-part choir (RV 595). It was composed around 1715 and therefore written for the Pio Ospedale della Pietà. It consists of two arias surrounding a central recitative. The text of RV 635 suggests it may have been written for the celebration of the Assumption of the Blessed Virgin Mary (August 15). The text addresses the Virgin Mary's ascent into heaven, along with celebration from local peasants using musical imagery of reeds and pipe organs.

=== Canta in Prato, RV 636 ===
Canta in Prato, Ride in Fonte, written for soprano, was intended to precede the Dixit Dominus for double orchestra and double choir (RV 594). It consists of two arias surrounding a central recitative, and has a similar text to an earlier motet, Canta in Prato, Ride in Monte (RV 623). The present work speaks of the nightingale Philomela and her joyous singing.

=== Cur Sagittas, RV 637 ===
The piece which should follow Cur Sagittas is lost. Vivaldi scholar Michael Talbot has conjectured that it might precede either the Kyrie RV 587 or a lost setting of the Gloria. The form is again two arias surrounding a central recitative. The first aria speaks of mythical creatures in conflict with a man of faith. The second aria then describes the person's strong faith in the Lord.

=== Filiae Maestae Jerusalem, RV 638 ===
Original Latin text

Filiae Maestae Jerusalem is the first of two introduzioni written to come before a setting of the Miserere (the second is RV 641). The Miserere itself is presumed lost. RV 638 consists of two recitatives around a single aria. This text concerns sad daughters of the Jerusalem after the death of Jesus Christ and the mourning of nature itself.

=== Jubilate, o amoeni cori, RV 639 ===
Jubilate is the only introduzione to come before Gloria (RV 588), in the form of Aria-Recitative-Aria. It speaks of choirs joying over the celebration of Christ. The last movement of this motet is interwoven with the first movement of the preceding piece (RV 588). Vivaldi cunningly combines both texts into one, the soloist from the introduzione singing the text from the motet. The present motet is essentially a call for all others to rejoice with musical instruments.

=== Longe Mala, Umbrae, Terrores, RV 640 ===
Longe Mala is the first of two introduzioni for RV 589, and is related to a motet based on similar text, RV 623, composed several years later in Vivaldi's visit to Rome. Unusually, the form for this motet is Aria-Recitative. The motet speaks of the terrors of the world and asks for the Lord to appear with his glory.

=== Non in Pratis, RV 641 ===
Non in Pratis is the second of two introduzioni to come before the lost Miserere. It consists of two recitatives, an aria, and a final recitative. The text, unlike the more universal message of RV 638, considers the personal pain and lament at the death of Jesus.

=== Ostro Picta, RV 642 ===
Ostro Picta was written to precede the Gloria (RV 589). It has the form aria-recitative-aria. The text contrasts the ephemeral glory of the world with the everlasting glory of the Virgin Mary.
