= Holy Spirit =

Concept within Abrahamic religions

The Holy Spirit, otherwise known as the Holy Ghost, is a concept within Abrahamic religions. In Judaism, the Holy Spirit is understood as the divine quality or force of God manifesting in the world, particularly in acts of prophecy, creation and guidance. In Nicene Christianity, this conception expanded in meaning to represent the third person of the Trinity, co-equal and co-eternal with God the Father and God the Son. In Islam, the Holy Spirit acts as an agent of divine action or communication. In the Baha'i Faith, the Holy Spirit is seen as the intermediary between God and man and "the outpouring grace of God and the effulgent rays that emanate from His Manifestation".

== Overview ==
The Hebrew Bible contains the term "spirit of God" (ruach elohim) which by Jews is interpreted in the sense of the might of a unitary God. This interpretation is different from the Nicene Christian conception of the Holy Spirit as one person of the Trinity.

The Christian concept tends to emphasize the moral aspect of the Holy Spirit as a common expression in the New Testament. For instance, the book of Acts emphasizes the power of ministry aspect of the Holy Spirit.

In general, Jews reject any conception of a co-equal, multi-person godhead; anything but an absolute monotheism is contrary to the Shema. They do not consider the Hebrew word for "one" (Hebrew: אחד, ekhad) as meaning anything other than a simple numerical one. The rabbinical understanding of the Holy Spirit has a certain degree of personification, but it remains, "a quality belonging to God, one of his attributes". The idea of God as a duality or trinity is considered shituf (or "not purely monotheistic").

According to theologian Rudolf Bultmann, there are two ways to think about the Holy Spirit: "animistic" and "dynamistic". In animistic thinking, he is "an independent agent, a personal power which (...) can fall upon a man and take possession of him, enabling him or compelling him to perform manifestations of power" while in dynamistic thought it "appears as an impersonal force which fills a man like a fluid". Both kinds of thought appear in Jewish and Christian scripture, but animistic is more typical of the Old Testament whereas dynamistic is more common in the New Testament. The distinction coincides with the Holy Spirit as either a temporary or permanent gift. In the Old Testament and Jewish thought, it is primarily temporary with a specific situation or task in mind, whereas in the Christian concept the gift resides in persons permanently.

== By faith ==
=== Judaism ===
The Hebrew language phrase ruach ha-kodesh (Hebrew: רוח הקודש, "holy spirit" also transliterated ruaḥ ha-qodesh) is used in the Hebrew Bible and Jewish writings to refer to the spirit of YHWH (רוח יהוה). The Hebrew terms ruacḥ qodshəka, "thy holy spirit" (רוּחַ קָדְשְׁךָ), and ruacḥ qodshō, "his holy spirit" (רוּחַ קָדְשׁוֹ), also occur (when a possessive suffix is added the definite article ha is dropped).

The Holy Spirit in Judaism generally refers to the divine aspect of prophecy and wisdom. It also refers to the divine force, quality, and influence of the Most High God, over the universe or over his creatures, in given contexts.

=== Christianity ===
For the large majority of Christians, the Holy Spirit (or Holy Ghost, from Old English gast, "spirit") is the third person of the Trinity: The "Triune God" manifested as Father, Son, and Holy Spirit; each Person being God. Two symbols from the New Testament canon are associated with the Holy Spirit in Christian iconography: a winged dove, and tongues of fire. Each depiction of the Holy Spirit arose from different accounts in the Gospel narratives; the first being at the baptism of Jesus in the Jordan River where the Holy Spirit was said to descend in the form of a dove as the voice of God the Father spoke as described in Matthew, Mark, and Luke; the second being from the day of Pentecost, fifty days after Passover where the descent of the Holy Spirit came upon the Apostles and other followers of Jesus Christ, as tongues of fire as described in the Acts of the Apostles, as promised by Jesus in his farewell discourse. Called "the unveiled epiphany of God", the Holy Spirit is the One who empowers the followers of Jesus with spiritual gifts and power that enables the proclamation of Jesus Christ, and the power that brings conviction of faith.

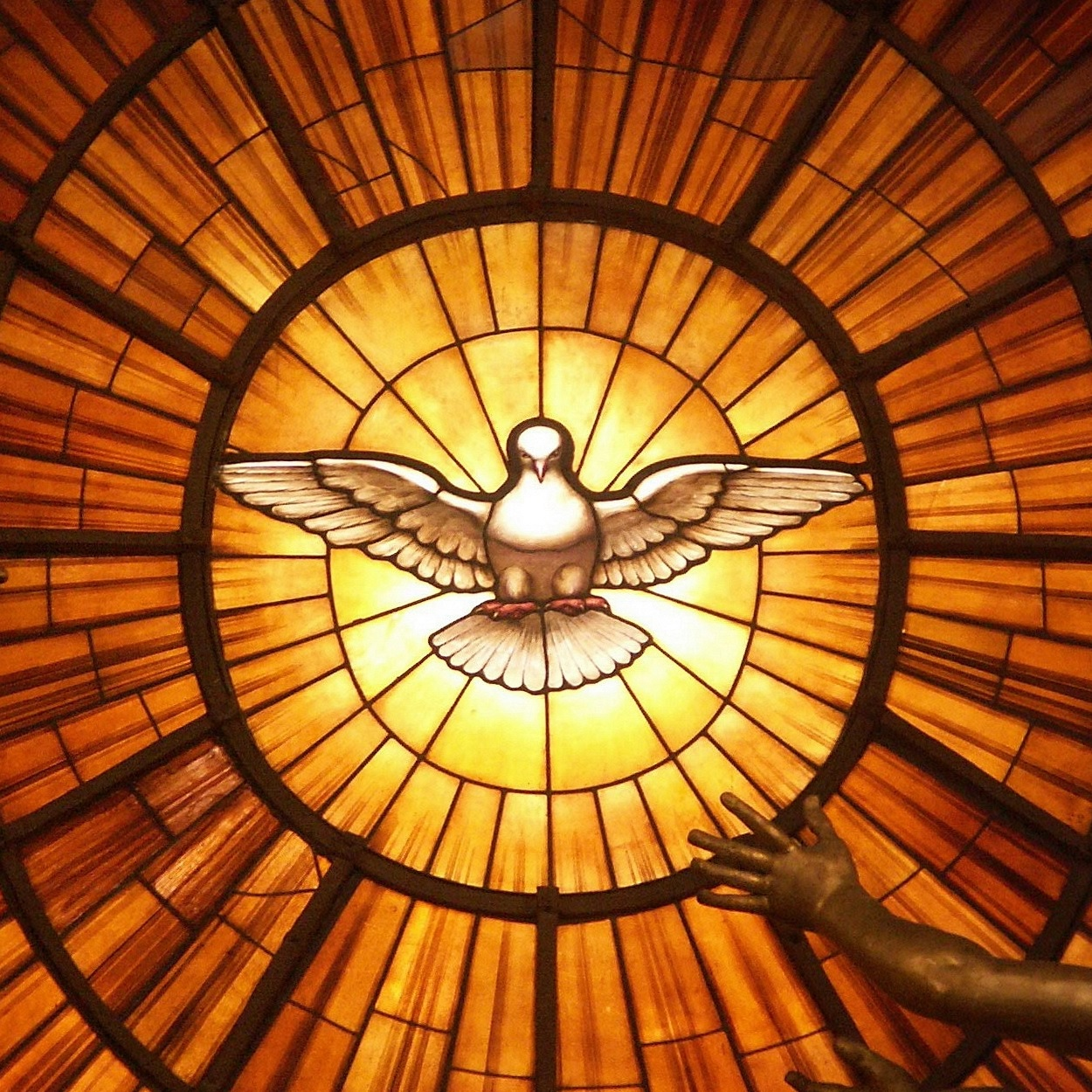
Depiction of the Christian Holy Spirit as a dove, by Gian Lorenzo Bernini, in the apse of Saint Peter's Basilica

A depiction of the Trinity consisting of God the Holy Spirit along with God the Father and God the Son

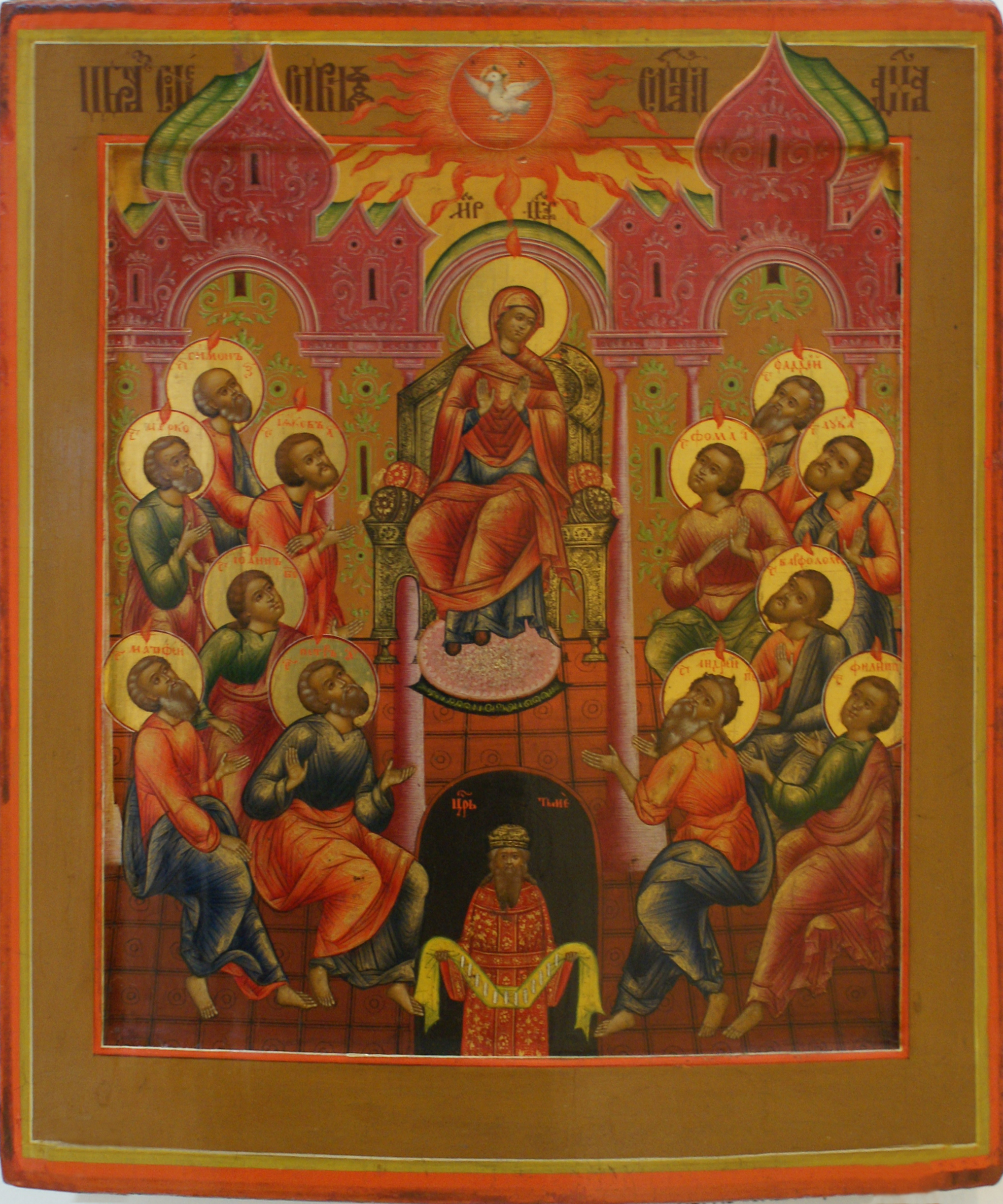
Pentecost icon depicting the descent of the Holy Spirit upon the Apostles and Mary in the form of tongues of flame above their heads

==== Gnostic Christianity ====
The ancient Gnostic text known as the Secret Book of John refers to the supreme female principle Barbelo as the Holy Spirit.

=== Islam ===
The Holy Spirit (Arabic: روح القدس, romanized: Ruh al-Qudus, "the Spirit of Holiness") is mentioned four times in the Qur'an, where it acts as an agent of divine action or communication. On the basis of narrations in certain Hadith and Tafsir, it is identified as the angel Gabriel (Arabic Jibrīl). The Spirit (الروح al-Ruh, without the adjective "holy" or "exalted") is described, among other things, as the creative spirit from God by which God enlivened Adam, and which inspired in various ways God's messengers and prophets, including Jesus and Abraham, thus being the angel Gabriel. The belief in a "Holy Trinity", according to the Qur'an, is forbidden and deemed to be blasphemy. The same prohibition applies to any idea of the duality of God (Allah).

=== Baháʼí Faith ===
The Baháʼí Faith has the concept of the Most Great Spirit, seen as the bounty of God. It is usually used to describe the descent of the Spirit of God upon the messengers/prophets of God who include, among others, Jesus, Muhammad and Bahá'u'lláh.

In Baháʼí belief, the Holy Spirit is the conduit through which the wisdom of God becomes directly associated with his messenger, and it has been described variously in different religions such as the burning bush to Moses, the sacred fire to Zoroaster, the dove to Jesus, the angel Gabriel to Muhammad, and the Maid of Heaven to Bahá'u'lláh (founder of the Baháʼí Faith). The Baháʼí view rejects the idea that the Holy Spirit is a partner to God in the Godhead, but rather is the pure essence of God's attributes.

== Comparative religion ==
On the surface, the Holy Spirit appears to have an equivalent in non-Abrahamic Hellenistic mystery religions. These religions included a distinction between the spirit and psyche, which is also seen in the Pauline epistles. According to proponents of the History of religions school, the Christian concept of the Holy Spirit cannot be explained from Jewish ideas alone without reference to the Hellenistic religions. But according to theologian Erik Konsmo, the views "are so dissimilar that the only legitimate connection one can make is with the Greek term πνεῦμα [pneuma, Spirit] itself".

Another link with ancient Greek thought is the Stoic idea of the spirit as anima mundi – or world soul – that unites all people. Some believe that this can be seen in Paul's formulation of the concept of the Holy Spirit that unites Christians in Jesus Christ and love for one another, but Konsmo again thinks that this position is difficult to maintain. In his Introduction to the 1964 book Meditations, the Anglican priest Maxwell Staniforth wrote:

Another Stoic concept which offered inspiration to the Church was that of "divine Spirit". Cleanthes, wishing to give more explicit meaning to Zeno's "creative fire", had been the first to hit upon the term pneuma, or "spirit", to describe it. Like fire, this intelligent "spirit" was imagined as a tenuous substance akin to a current of air or breath, but essentially possessing the quality of warmth; it was immanent in the universe as God, and in man as the soul and life-giving principle. Clearly it is not a long step from this to the "Holy Spirit" of Christian theology, the "Lord and Giver of life", visibly manifested as tongues of fire at Pentecost and ever since associated – in the Christian as in the Stoic mind – with the ideas of vital fire and beneficent warmth.

The theologian Raimon Panikkar believed the Hindu concept of Advaita was linked to the Trinity. He stated that the Holy Spirit, as one of the Three Persons of the Trinity of "father, Logos and Holy Spirit", was a bridge-builder between Christianity and Hinduism, despite Shiva and the Holy Spirit occupying vastly different roles in their respective religions. He explains that: "The meeting of spiritualistic can take place in the Spirit. No new 'system' has primarily to come of this encounter, but a new and yet old spirit must emerge." Atman is Vedic terminology elaborated in Hindu scriptures such as Upanishads and Vedanta signifies the Ultimate Reality and Absolute.

The Holy Spirit can be compared to the concept in Zoroastrianism of Spenta Mainyu, a hypostasis of Ahura Mazda, the supreme Creator God of Zoroastrianism; the Spenta Mainyu is seen as the source of all goodness in the universe, the spark of all life within humanity, and is the ultimate guide for humanity to righteousness and communion with God. The Spenta Mainyu is put in direct opposition to its eternal dual counterpart, Angra Mainyu, who is the source of all wickedness and who leads humanity astray.

== See also ==
- Avatar
- Baptism with the Holy Spirit
- Barakah
- Chaplet of the Holy Spirit and His Seven Gifts
- Cult of the Holy Spirit
- Gender of the Holy Spirit
- God in Abrahamic religions
- Great Spirit
- Intercession of the Spirit
- Parable of the Leaven
- Pneumatology
