= Intercession =

Praying to God in heaven on behalf of oneself or others

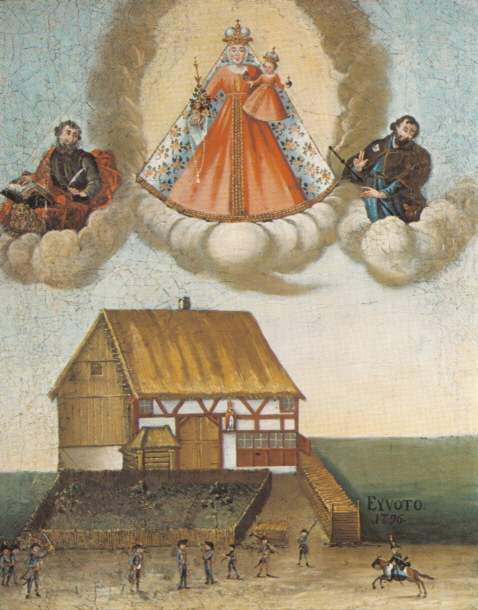
A German votive offering thanks to the Virgin Mary in the form of a painting (1796)

Intercession or intercessory prayer is the act of praying on behalf of others, or asking God in heaven to pray on behalf of oneself or for others.

The Apostle Paul's exhortation to Timothy specified that intercession prayers should be made for all people.

I urge, then, first of all, that petitions, prayers, intercession and thanksgiving be made for all people—for kings and all those in authority, that we may live peaceful and quiet lives in all godliness and holiness.

— 1 Timothy 2:1–2

A prayer request is a request made by one person asking another to pray for a specific need or concern on their behalf. In certain denominations of Christianity (such as Methodism), worship services may include a designated time during which congregants can share prayer requests, offer praise reports, and give testimonies.

== Christianity ==
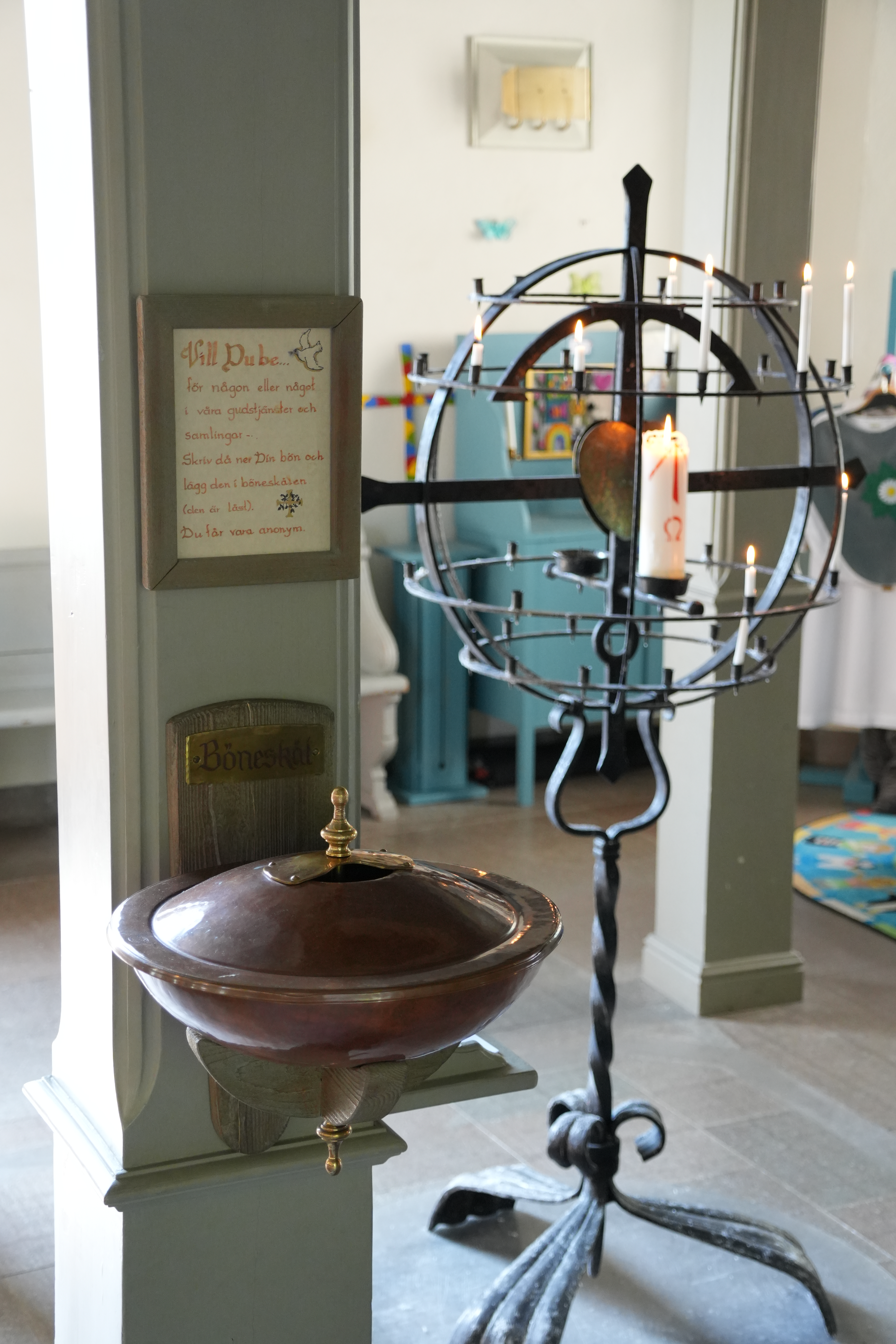
Votive candle rack next to an intercessory prayer box at Norrtälje Church (Evangelical-Lutheran) in Stockholm County, Sweden

=== In the early Church ===
The early Christians continued to practice intercessory prayer on behalf of others after Jesus' death. Ignatius of Antioch was one man who exhorted Christians to continue to pray for others, and especially for those who became Docetists or held other heretical beliefs. In his letter to the churches of Smyrna, St. Ignatius exhorts the Christians there to pray for other people: "only you must pray to God for them, if by any means they may be brought to repentance, which, however, will be very difficult. Yet Jesus Christ, who is our true life, has the power of [effecting] this". Throughout all of Ignatius's letters, the word for prayers of intercession appears nineteen times, and Ignatius asks for prayer "for himself (eight times), for the Christian church in Syria (seven times), for persecutors, heretics, and all people generally (once each)".

St. Ignatius and the other church fathers, such as Paul the Apostle, who were keen on intercessory prayer based this practice on Jesus' own teachings which required that one pray for others, especially one's enemies:

But to you who are listening I say: Love your enemies, do good to those who hate you, bless those who curse you, pray for those who mistreat you.

— Luke 6:27–28

According to Lionel Swain, of St. Edmund's College, Ware, St. Paul believed intercession to be one of the most important aspects of faith and praying life, as praying for others is a recurring theme in his works. For St. Paul, prayer serves as a means to acknowledge God's power. Intercessory prayer also acts as a way for the Apostle to "share in... the Father's redemptive love". Paul believed that prayer transformed the person doing the praying, as much as the one being prayed for, which creates a stronger bond between him and God.

Prof. Dr Johannes van Oort, Professor Extraordinarius in the Department of Church History and Church Polity of the Faculty of Theology at the University of Pretoria, South Africa, adds that, in addition to praying for wisdom, the early church was very much involved with different charismas, one of which being healing. Praying for other people's illnesses was another way that intercessory prayer was important in the early church, as healing was a sign of "the power of God's Kingdom". This gift of healing is specifically mentioned, among the other charismata, as a sign of being a true Christian by Irenaeus of Lyons in his text, Against Heresies.

=== Saints ===
Intercession of the saints is a doctrine held by the Eastern Orthodox, Oriental Orthodox, Roman Catholic, Lutheran and Anglican churches that teaches that saints intercede (or pray) for the Church. The doctrine of requesting intercession from saints, known as the invocation of saints, can be found in Christian writings from the 3rd century AD, such as from Origen and Clement of Alexandria. The invocation of the saints is practiced by the Orthodox and Roman Catholic churches, though not by the Lutheran and Anglican churches (apart from those of Evangelical Catholic or Anglo-Catholic churchmanship, respectively). The comprecation of saints is the practice in which Christians ask God directly for a share in the prayers offered by the saints; the comprecation of the saints is done by Orthodox, Catholics, Lutherans and Anglicans.

Christian traditions differ on the necessity of intercession. Some Christian traditions have insisted on the intercessory roles of Mary and other saints. Protestants largely reject saintly intercession.

=== The dead ===
In addition to praying for those still living, early Christians would pray for those who had died. There is no unequivocal evidence that Christians began to pray for the dead before the third century AD. G. F. Hamilton argues that the earliest example of Church prayer on behalf of dead Christians is found in the Sacramentary of Serapion of Thmuis (350 AD). Rather than pray for the departed in regular church services on Sunday, these early Christians would hold special commemorative occasions during the week. There was a sharp distinction drawn between remembering and praying on behalf of the dead, and those who were the "'faithfully' departed", where Christians would only pray for those who had died as believers. The First Epistle of Clement (95 AD) contains a prayer which, while mainly for protection for the living, also includes the dead. Even quite early, a distinction was drawn between those who had died as Christians, and those who had died as unbelievers. In the Martyrdom of Polycarp (155 AD), Polycarp is killed and his bones are taken by fellow Christians and a shrine is set up to him, where they may remember his martyrdom. In contrast, the "Apology of Aristides" shows how those who were not Christians were grieved for, while the dead faithful were rejoiced over.

=== Theological perspective ===
In an article in Theological Studies, Catholic theologian Patricia A. Sullivan warns that saints should not be depended upon in a way that devalues God. Saint Augustine had famously said that we pray not to instruct God but to get our will in line with God's. Sullivan cautions using synonyms of "intercession" like “intervention, mediation, arbitration, negotiation”, as they imply that God is inaccessible due to a hostile or unfriendly nature, and thus someone whom we need to manipulate to get what we need. Such is not the meaning of the hapax legomenon in the New Testament of the word for intercession. Sullivan goes on:

When we ask a saint to intercede for us, what is happening at a deeper level is that we are taking refuge in the all-enfolding community of the redeemed, approaching God thru saintly symbols of Christ's victory and of our hope. Saints want always what God wants, what is best for us whether we pray for it or not. They are in a perpetual attitude of praise for God’s love and care, to which we join ourselves, praying, more precisely, with them rather than to them. The value of our petitions is that they turn us in confidence toward the God who loves us, allowing God’s work to be more effective in us, and thru us in others.

It would be anathema to ask God to try any harder to do good. By invocation of a saint "we take refuge in faith in the all-enfolding community of all the redeemed," where "each is responsible for all". They are "creative models of holiness".

== Islam ==
Although the idea of intercession or mediation (Arabic: s̲h̲afāʿa) has historically played a very prominent role in Islamic thought, it is not universally accepted by all Muslims in the present day.

The Quran says that the pre-Islamic Arab pagan gods will not be able to intercede with God on behalf of humankind, and that "the guilty" (al-mujrimīn, Q74:41) will not benefit from any intercession on the Day of Judgment. Other passages that deny the efficacy of intercession include Q32:4 and Q39:44. Still others say that God is the only intercessor (Q6:51, Q6:70; Q32:4; Q39:44). However, the Quran is not to be understood literally and an exegesis is necessary for proper interpretation.

For example, "intercession is mentioned in the Qurʾān with respect to angels praying for the believers and the Prophet praying for erring but repentant Muslims." Furthermore, it became an orthodox Islamic doctrine or "cardinal belief" that "Muḥammad will intercede for all Muslims on the Day of Resurrection." While this particular tenet practically remained unchallenged throughout Islamic history, the widespread Sunni and Shia practice of asking deceased prophets and saints for intercession by praying at their tombs have become contentious issues in the modern Islamic world. All these different types of intercession are often labelled by Salafi/Wahhabi Muslims as a type of polytheism, in a manner akin to the attitude of many Protestants towards the Catholic and Eastern Orthodox practice of saint-intercession.

== Studies ==
Some religions claim that praying for somebody who is sick can have positive effects on the health of the person being prayed for.

Meta-studies of the literature in the field have been performed showing evidence only for no effect or a potentially small effect. For instance, a 2006 meta analysis on 14 studies concluded that there is "no discernible effect" while a 2007 systemic review of intercessory prayer reported inconclusive results, noting that 7 of 17 studies had "small, but significant, effect sizes" but the review noted that the most methodologically rigorous studies failed to produce significant findings.

== See also ==
- Episcopal intercession
- Faith healing
- Feast of the Intercession
- Intercession of Christ
- Intercession of the Theotokos
- Prayer warrior
