= Gender of God in Christianity =

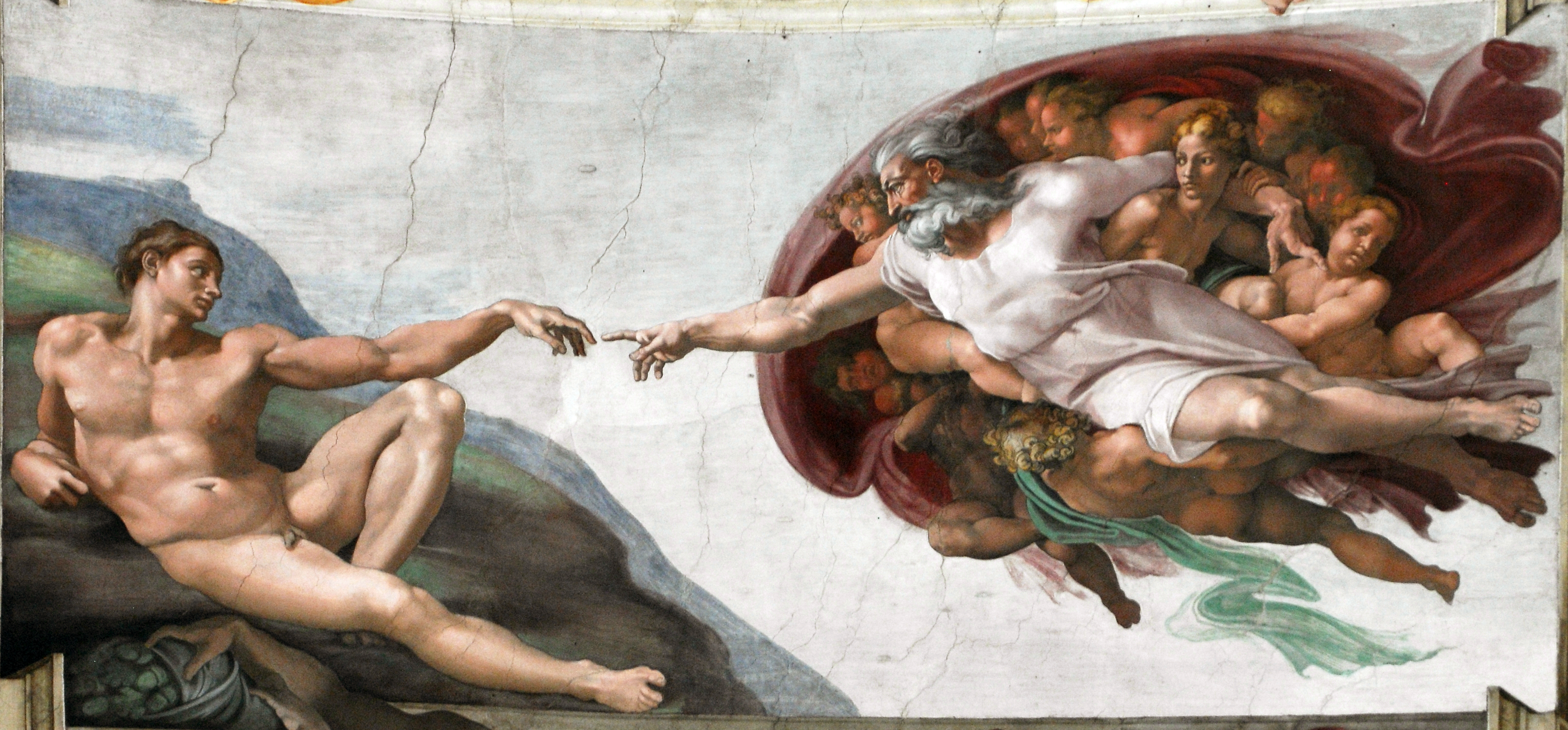
The Creation of Adam, Sistine Chapel ceiling, Michelangelo.

God in Christianity is represented by the Trinity of three hypostases or "persons" described as Father, Son and Holy Spirit. While "Father" and "Son" implicitly invoke masculine sex, the gender of the Holy Spirit from earliest times was also represented as including feminine aspects (partly due to grammatical gender, especially in the Syriac church). Today, there is a push among some Christians to describe God using different pronouns from those which have traditionally been used.

== Grammatical gender in the Bible ==
=== Hebrew Bible ===
The first words of the Old Testament are B'reshit bara Elohim—"In the beginning God created." The verb bara (created) agrees with a masculine singular subject. Elohim is used to refer to both genders and is plural; it has been used to refer to both Goddess (in 1 Kings 11:33), and God (1 Kings 11:31;). The masculine gender in Hebrew can be used for objects with no inherent gender, as well as objects with masculine natural gender, and so it is widely used, attributing the masculine gender to most things. However, the noun used for the Spirit of God in Genesis—"Ruach"—is distinctly feminine, as is the verb used to describe the Spirit's activity during creation—"rachaph"—translated as "fluttereth". This verb is used only one other place in the Bible (Deuteronomy 32:11) where it describes the action of a mother eagle towards her nest. The consistent use of feminine nouns and verbs to refer to the Spirit of God in the Torah, as well as the rest of the Jewish Scriptures, indicates that at least this aspect of Elohim was consistently perceived as feminine. Genesis 1:26–27 says that humans were made male and female in the image of elohim.

Two of the most common phrases in the Tanakh are vayomer Elohim and vayomer YHWH—"and God said". Again, the verb vayomer (he said) is masculine; it is never vatomer, the feminine of the same verb form. The personal name of God, YHWH, is presented in Exodus 3 as if the Y (Hebrew yod) is the masculine subjective prefix to the verb to be.

In Psalm 89:26 God is referred to as Father. "He shall cry unto me, Thou art my Father, My God, and the rock of my salvation."

In the book of Isaiah, the prophet himself brings up feminine imagery for God, comparing God to a woman in labor in multiple verses throughout the book. The book also refers to God as a nursing mother.

Some literary approaches to the Old Testament have argued that parallels between Biblical stories and earlier Sumerian, Akkadian and Canaanite creation myths show a matriarchal substratum that has been overlaid by a patriarchal approach. "In the Bible, the earth is the feminine complement of God: the two combined to form man, who articulates their relationship, for example, in sacrifice."

=== New Testament ===
Jesus Christ, the Son of God is referred to with masculine pronouns, and is generally noted to be a male gendered human being throughout the New Testament. Despite this general reference, Jesus himself does use feminine metaphorical language to talk about himself. In the Gospel of Matthew, Jesus says:

How often have I desired to gather your children together as a hen gathers her brood under her wings, and you were not willing! See, your house is left to you, desolate.

The New Testament also refers to the Holy Spirit in masculine terminology, most clearly in the Gospel of John 14–16.

== Early Church views ==
Clement of Alexandria (150–215 AD) wrote about God's motherly and fatherly characteristics, but did not refer to God with feminine language or pronouns.

Augustine of Hippo similarly used feminine metaphors, but not pronouns.

This is a general trend in the early church patristics, using specifically motherly imagery but not feminine pronouns for God. God is generally not referred to with feminine characteristics outside of mothering.

== Denominational views ==
=== Catholic Church ===
The Catechism of the Catholic Church (CCC) #239 states, in reference to the Father: "God transcends the human distinction between the sexes. He is neither man nor woman: he is God." The CCC discusses the traditional imagery and language of God as Father. It notes, however, that God is not limited to this role alone—maternal imagery is also used in the Bible. It also notes that human fatherhood only imperfectly reflects God's archetypal fatherhood. God is referred to using masculine pronouns in Catholic teaching and practice.

Catholic teaching, in line with the Doctors of the Church, holds that God has no literal sex because God possesses no body but is referred to using masculine pronouns in the Bible.

=== National Council of Churches ===
The Inclusive Language Lectionary published by the American National Council of Churches, to which many Protestant churches belong, states in its introduction "The God worshiped by the biblical authors and worshiped in the Church today cannot be regarded as having gender, race, or color."

=== LDS Church ===
The Church of Jesus Christ of Latter-day Saints (LDS Church) differs from most churches in that they believe that the Father, the Son and the Spirit are separate and male as well as masculine. The LDS Church also teaches that God the Father is married to a divine woman, referred to as "Heavenly Mother". Humans are considered to be spirit children of these heavenly parents.

=== United Church of Christ ===
The New Century Hymnal, the hymnal of the United Church of Christ (UCC), uses inclusive language; one of its concerns while being authored was reducing the solely-masculine use of language for God, and/or balancing masculine images with feminine and non-gendered images, while retaining masculine imagery for Jesus regarding his earthly life.

At least two UCC conferences (Massachusetts and Ohio) have adopted guidelines for using inclusive language, and the majority of clergy and laity in the UCC report using inclusive language when referring to God during worship.

=== Metropolitan Community Church ===
The Metropolitan Community Church encourages inclusive language and uses "God—our Parent-Creator", "Jesus Christ the only begotten son of God", and "the Holy Spirit" in its Statement of Faith to refer to the three persons of the Trinity.

=== Methodism ===
The United Methodist Church allows for the usage of any gendered language to describe God. This is based in a belief that however religious adherents desire to participate in God-talk should be valued and honored. The British Methodist Church uses liturgy that includes prayers addressed to "God our Father and our Mother".

== Gender-inclusive language ==
Multiple groups consider gender-neutral language (e.g. referring to God as "they" or only as "God") as inadequate in reflecting the nature of God; however, in recent history, several liberal and mainline Protestant denominations have adopted or encouraged its use when referring to God. These include the United Church of Christ, the Evangelical Lutheran Church of America and the Metropolitan Community Church. Still others object on aesthetic grounds that gender-inclusive constructions, such as invented gender or alternating gender, are clumsy.

== Inclusive language in media ==
There is some level of debate in popular culture, particularly in American popular culture as to what pronouns are appropriate for describing God.

=== List of some media depictions of God as feminine ===
Writer Glennon Doyle is famous for using feminine pronouns for God, when asked by someone why she thinks of God as a woman she says:

I don't. I think it's ridiculous to think of God as anything that could possibly be gendered. But as long as the expression of God as female is unimaginable to many while the expression of God as male feels perfectly acceptable – and as long as women continue to be undervalued and abused and controlled here on Earth – I'll keep using it.

Alanis Morissette plays God in the 1999 film Dogma.

The 2007 novel (and 2017 movie) The Shack: Where Tragedy Confronts Eternity by William P. Young depicts God as a female.

== See also ==
- Gender of the Holy Spirit
- Sophia (wisdom)
