= Psalm 110 =

110th psalm of the book of psalms

- "The LORD said unto my Lord"
- Royal psalm
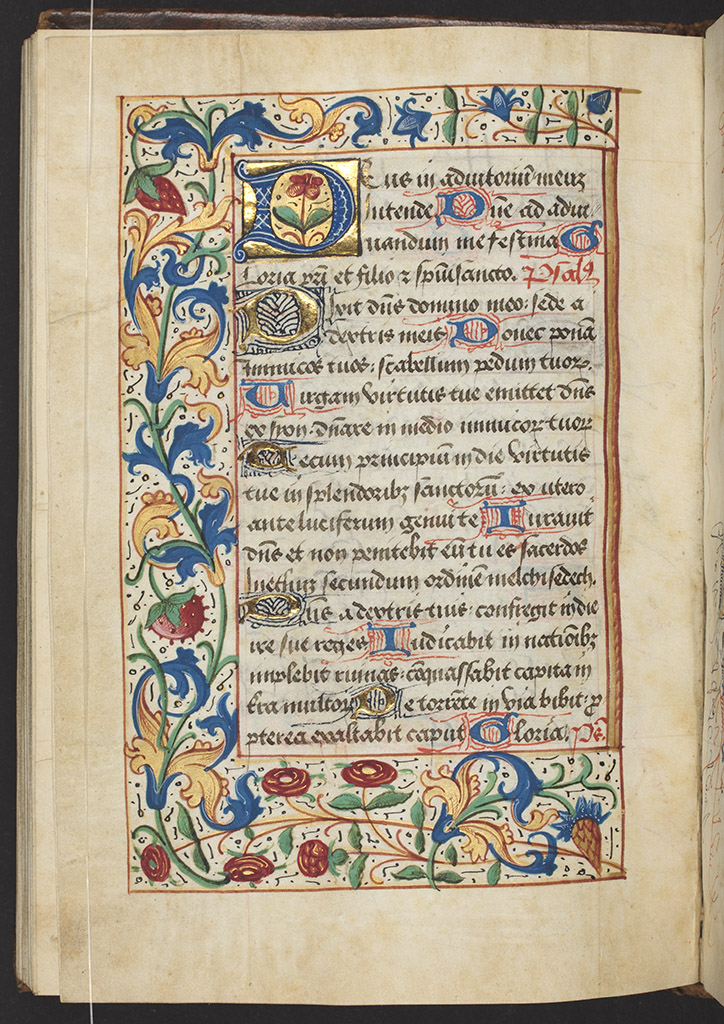
- Introduction to Vespers and beginning of the psalm, "Dixit Dominus", in a Book of Hours
- Other name: Psalm 109; "Dixit Dominus"
- Language: Hebrew (original)

Psalm 110
- ← Psalm 109 Psalm 111 →
- Book: Book of Psalms
- Hebrew Bible part: Ketuvim
- Order in the Hebrew part: 1
- Category: Sifrei Emet
- Christian Bible part: Old Testament
- Order in the Christian part: 19

Psalm 110 is the 110th psalm of the Book of Psalms, beginning in English in the King James Version: "The LORD said unto my Lord". In the slightly different numbering system used in the Greek Septuagint and Latin Vulgate translations of the Bible, this psalm is Psalm 109. In Latin, it is known as Dixit Dominus ("The Lord Said"). It is considered both a royal psalm and a messianic psalm. C. S. Rodd and other scholars associate it with the king's coronation and view it as an enthronement song. The text is commonly held to have been uttered by a court prophet in the temple of Jerusalem, where King David is the singer's master.

The psalm forms a regular part of Jewish, Catholic, Lutheran, Anglican and other Protestant liturgies. Because this psalm is prominent in the Office of Vespers, its Latin text has particular significance in music. Well-known vespers settings are Monteverdi's Vespro della Beata Vergine (1610), and Mozart's Vesperae solennes de confessore (1780). Handel composed his Dixit Dominus in 1707, and Vivaldi set the psalm in Latin three times.

== Background ==
The psalm is usually dated in its first part in the pre-exilic period of Israel, sometimes even completely in the oldest monarchy.

O. Palmer Robertson observes the concept of a priest-king seen in Psalm 110 is also seen in the post-exilic minor prophet Zechariah 6:12-13, emphasizing the priest-king will also build the Lord's temple and rule as priest on the throne.

== Interpretation ==
=== Judaism ===
The Talmud (Nedarim 32a) and Midrash Tehillim state that this psalm speaks about Abraham, who was victorious in battle to save his nephew Lot and merited priesthood. According to the Avot of Rabbi Natan (34:6) the psalm is speaking of the Jewish Messiah in the context of the Four Craftsmen in Zechariah's vision. Rashi, Gershonides, and Rabbi David Kimhi identify the subject of the psalm as David.

=== Christianity ===
As part of the messianic tradition of the Old Testament, the psalm is frequently referred to in the New Testament. Allusions are found in Mark 12:36, 14:62, Luke 20 41–44, 1 Corinthians 15:25, Hebrews 5:1–6, 6:20, 7:4–7, 7:17–24.

The Vulgate text of the psalm is part of the Latin liturgy for vespers, and there are numerous adaptations in sacral music, including by Georg Friedrich Händel (Dixit Dominus), Claudio Monteverdi (SV 206, SV 252–288), Johann Rosenmüller, Antonio Lotti, Antonio Vivaldi (RV 594, 595, 807), Alessandro Scarlatti, Wolfgang Amadeus Mozart (KV 193, 321, 339).

The significance of the psalm is also recognized in Protestant tradition. Nonconformist minister Matthew Henry said that this psalm is "pure gospel" and specifically refers to Jesus as the Messiah. Reformed Baptist Charles Spurgeon concurs that while David composed the psalm, the psalm is solely about Jesus.

=== The priest-king ===
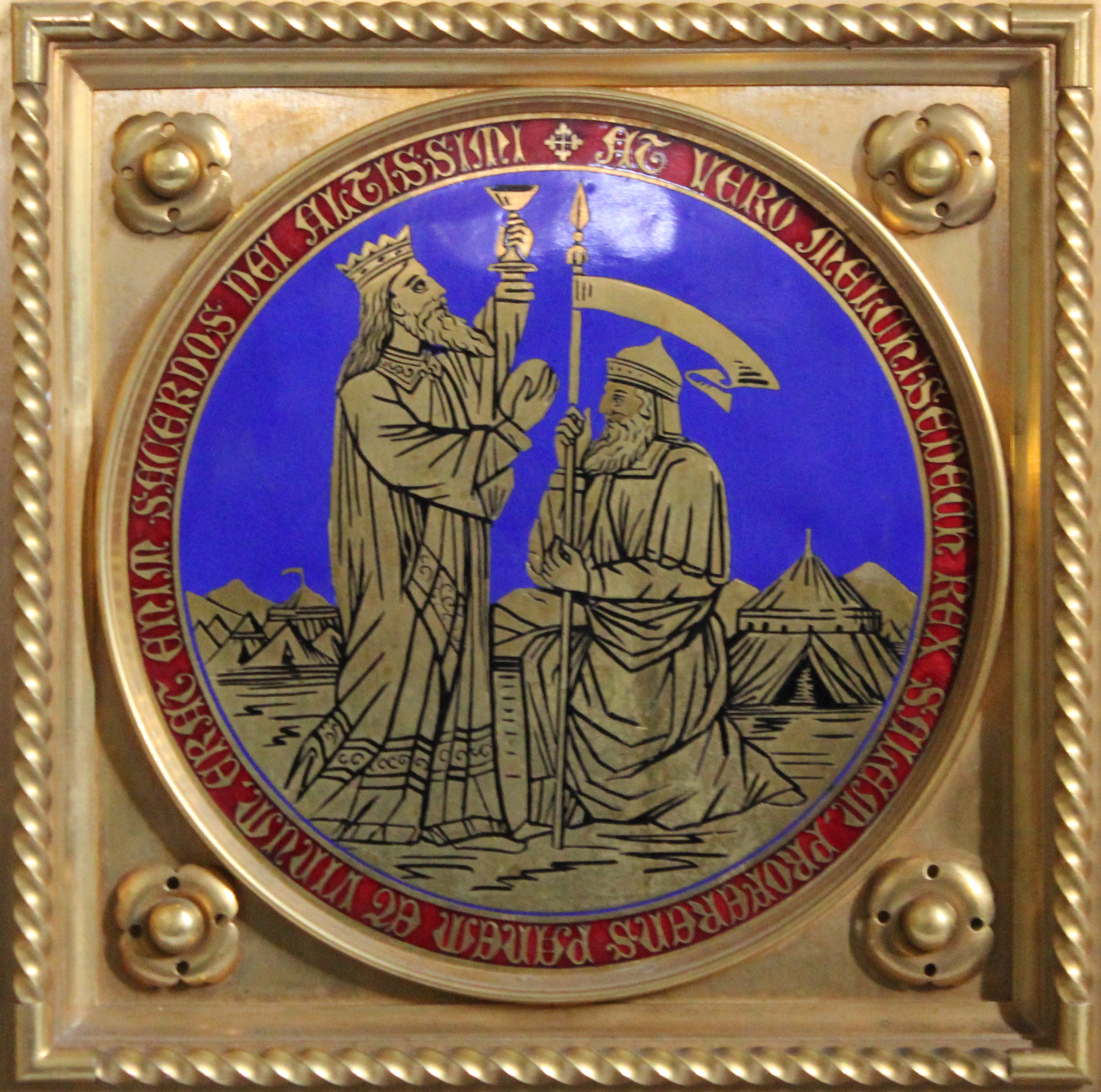
The altar of the Dominican church at Friesach, Austria, showing Abraham meeting Melchizedek

A second point on which Jewish and Christian interpretations differ is the language in verse 4, which describes a person who combines the offices of kingship and priesthood, as exemplified by the non-Jewish king Melchizedek. Ostensibly, this could not apply to King David, who was not a kohen (priest). However, Rashi explains here that the term kohen occasionally refers to a ministerial role, as in (II Sam. 8:18), "and David's sons were kohanim (ministers of state)". Gershonides and Rabbi David Kimhi further state that the term kohen could be applied to a "chief ruler". Thus, the prophetic promise, "You will be a priest forever", can be translated as "You will be a head and prince of Israel", referring to David.

Spurgeon rejects this interpretation, stating that in ancient Israel, no one held the offices of king and priest simultaneously. However, that title can be given to Jesus, "the apostle and high priest of our profession". The psalm is used in the Epistle to the Hebrews to justify the award of the title "High Priest" to Jesus from Scripture. Henry notes: "Melchizedek was 'a priest upon his throne' (Zech. 6:13), so is Christ, king of righteousness and king of peace. Melchizedek had no successor, nor has Christ; his is an unchangeable priesthood".

Numerous scholars have suggested that the Hasmonean dynasty used Psalm 110's priest-king combination as a justification for their rulers (starting with Simon Thassi) taking the simultaneous roles of High Priest and monarch (i.e., ethnarch and later basileus).

== Uses ==
=== New Testament ===
- Verse 1 is quoted in Matthew 22:44, Mark 12:36, Luke 20:42–43, Acts 2:34–35, and Hebrews 1:13.
- Verse 4 is quoted in Hebrews

=== Judaism ===
Verses 6–7 are the final two verses of Av HaRachamim, said during the Shabbat and Yom Tov morning service.

Psalm 110 is recited on Shabbat Lech-Lecha in the Siddur Avodas Yisroel.

This psalm is recited as a prayer of protection to achieve peace with enemies.

=== Protestantism ===
Oliver Cromwell reportedly had his army sing this psalm before going out to battle against Scotland; it was his "favorite fighting song". This led to Psalm 110 becoming known as "the cursing psalm".

=== Book of Common Prayer ===
In the Church of England's Book of Common Prayer, this psalm is appointed to be read on the morning of the twenty-third day of the month, as well as at Evensong on Christmas Day.

=== Catholicism ===
In his Rule (530), Saint Benedict of Nursia designated psalms 109 to 147 for vespers, except those psalms reserved for other hours. Therefore, from the early Middle Ages, Psalm 110 (109 in the Septuagint numbering, beginning in Latin Dixit Dominus) has traditionally been recited at the beginning of vespers on every Sunday. It continues to be the first psalm at vespers on Sundays, solemnities and celebrations with the rank of "feast".

Verses 1 to 4 form the responsorial psalm that follows the first reading on the solemnity of the Holy Body and Blood of Christ in the third year of the three-year cycle of readings.

=== Coptic Orthodox Church ===
In the Agpeya, the Coptic Church's book of hours, this psalm is prayed in the office of None. It is also in the prayer of the Veil, which is generally prayed only by monks.

=== Musical settings ===
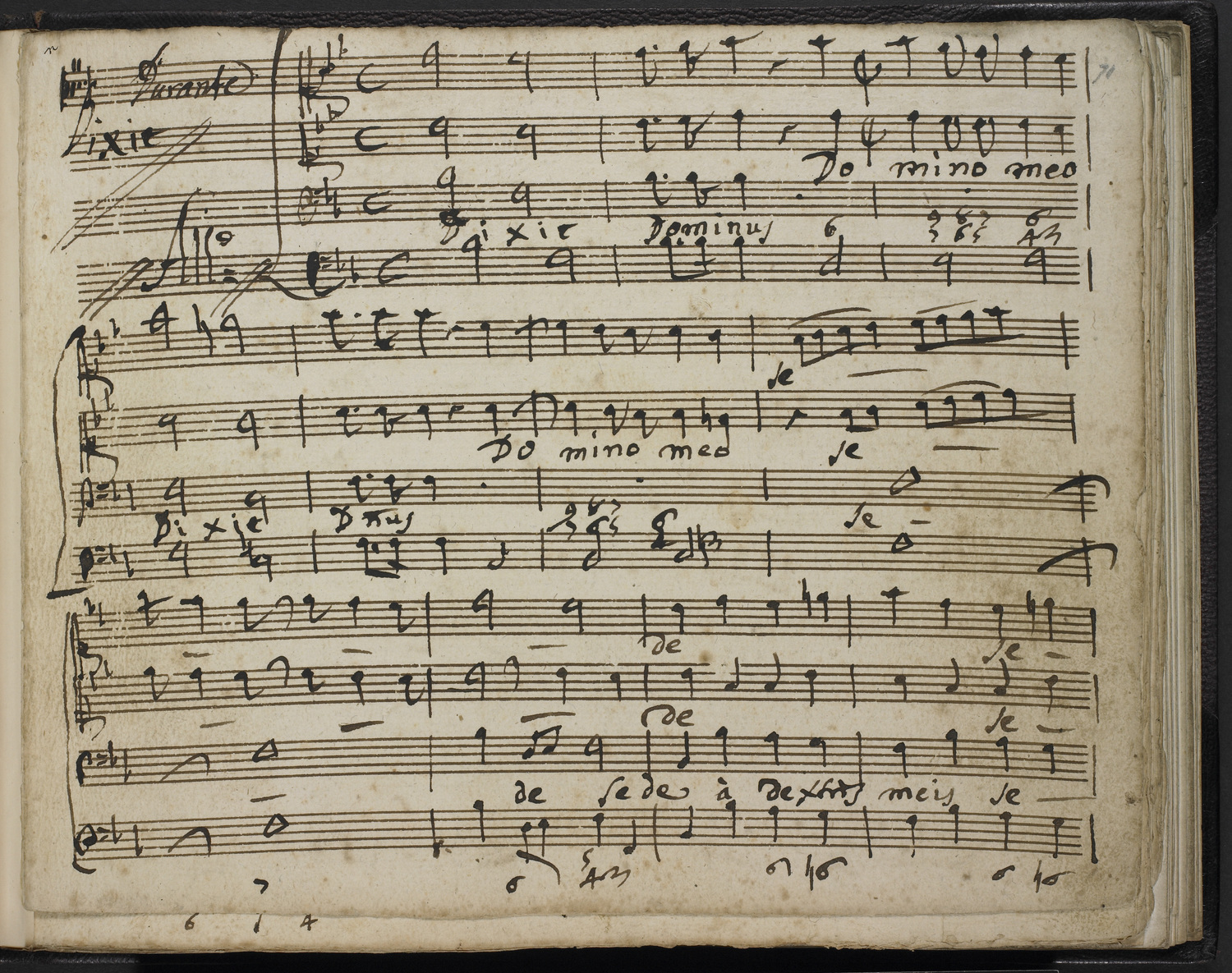
Francesco Durante – Dixit Dominus

Because this Psalm is the first in the Office of Sunday Vespers, its Latin text, which begins with Dixit Dominus, has particular significance in music. It was set by Tomás Luis de Victoria in 1581, among many other 16th century composers. Claudio Monteverdi composed a choral setting in his Vespro della Beata Vergine in 1610 and again in his Selva morale e spirituale in 1640. Marc-Antoine Charpentier composed 6 "Dixit Dominus", H.153, H.197, H.202, H.204, H.190, H.226 (1670 - 1690), Michel-Richard de Lalande, one setting S.73, André Campra, one setting, François Giroust, one setting in 1772 and Alessandro Scarlatti one setting in 1700. George Frideric Handel wrote his Dixit Dominus, HWV 232 in 1707, his earliest surviving autograph. Nicola Porpora set the psalm in 1720, and both Jan Dismas Zelenka and Antonio Vivaldi wrote three settings each. Giovanni Battista Pergolesi set the psalm in 1732, Leonardo Leo in both 1741 and 1742, and Francesco Durante in 1753. Marianna von Martines set Dixit Dominus in 1773, for her entry into the Academia Filharmonica di Bolognia. Wolfgang Amadeus Mozart set the psalm for choir and orchestra in his vespers, Vesperae solennes de Dominica, K. 321 (1779) and Vesperae solennes de confessore, K. 339 (1780). Michel Richard Delalande and Michael Haydn composed settings in the 18th century.

Heinrich Schütz set the psalm in German twice, "Der Herr sprach zu meinem Herren", in 1619 as the first movement of his Psalmen Davids for voices and instruments (SWV 22), and for choir as part of his setting of the Becker Psalter (SWV 208).

In 1959, Richard Rodgers composed a partial setting of the psalm for the opening sequence of his musical The Sound of Music, using verses 1, 5, and 7.

== Text ==
The following table shows the Hebrew text of the Psalm with vowels, alongside the Koine Greek text in the Septuagint and the English translation from the King James Version. Note that the meaning can slightly differ between these versions, as the Septuagint and the Masoretic Text come from different textual traditions. (Note: A 1917 translation directly from Hebrew to English by the Jewish Publication Society can be found here or here, and an 1844 translation directly from the Septuagint by L. C. L. Brenton can be found here. Both translations are in the public domain.) In the Septuagint, this psalm is numbered Psalm 109.

#	Hebrew	English	Greek
1	לְדָוִ֗ד מִ֫זְמ֥וֹר נְאֻ֤ם יְהֹוָ֨ה ׀ לַֽאדֹנִ֗י שֵׁ֥ב לִֽימִינִ֑י עַד־אָשִׁ֥ית אֹ֝יְבֶ֗יךָ הֲדֹ֣ם לְרַגְלֶֽיךָ׃	(A Psalm of David.) The LORD said unto my Lord, Sit thou at my right hand, until I make thine enemies thy footstool.	Ψαλμὸς τῷ Δαυΐδ. - ΕΙΠΕΝ ὁ Κύριος τῷ Κυρίῳ μου· κάθου ἐκ δεξιῶν μου, ἕως ἂν θῶ τοὺς ἐχθρούς σου ὑποπόδιον τῶν ποδῶν σου.
2	מַטֵּֽה־עֻזְּךָ֗ יִשְׁלַ֣ח יְ֭הֹוָה מִצִּיּ֑וֹן רְ֝דֵ֗ה בְּקֶ֣רֶב אֹיְבֶֽיךָ׃	The LORD shall send the rod of thy strength out of Zion: rule thou in the midst of thine enemies.	ῥάβδον δυνάμεως ἐξαποστελεῖ σοι Κύριος ἐκ Σιών, καὶ κατακυρίευε ἐν μέσῳ τῶν ἐχθρῶν σου.
3	עַמְּךָ֣ נְדָבֹת֮ בְּי֢וֹם חֵ֫ילֶ֥ךָ בְּֽהַדְרֵי־קֹ֭דֶשׁ מֵרֶ֣חֶם מִשְׁחָ֑ר לְ֝ךָ֗ טַ֣ל יַלְדֻתֶֽיךָ׃	Thy people shall be willing in the day of thy power, in the beauties of holiness from the womb of the morning: thou hast the dew of thy youth.	μετὰ σοῦ ἡ ἀρχὴ ἐν ἡμέρᾳ τῆς δυνάμεώς σου ἐν ταῖς λαμπρότησι τῶν ἁγίων σου· ἐκ γαστρὸς πρὸ ἑωσφόρου ἐγέννησά σε.
4	נִשְׁבַּ֤ע יְהֹוָ֨ה ׀ וְלֹ֥א יִנָּחֵ֗ם אַתָּֽה־כֹהֵ֥ן לְעוֹלָ֑ם עַל־דִּ֝בְרָתִ֗י מַלְכִּי־צֶֽדֶק׃	The LORD hath sworn, and will not repent, Thou art a priest for ever after the order of Melchizedek.	ὤμοσε Κύριος καὶ οὐ μεταμεληθήσεται· σὺ ἱερεὺς εἰς τὸν αἰῶνα κατὰ τὴν τάξιν Μελχισεδέκ.
5	אֲדֹנָ֥י עַל־יְמִֽינְךָ֑ מָחַ֖ץ בְּיוֹם־אַפּ֣וֹ מְלָכִֽים׃	The Lord at thy right hand shall strike through kings in the day of his wrath.	Κύριος ἐκ δεξιῶν σου συνέθλασεν ἐν ἡμέρᾳ ὀργῆς αὐτοῦ βασιλεῖς·
6	יָדִ֣ין בַּ֭גּוֹיִם מָלֵ֣א גְוִיּ֑וֹת מָ֥חַץ רֹ֝֗אשׁ עַל־אֶ֥רֶץ רַבָּֽה׃	He shall judge among the heathen, he shall fill the places with the dead bodies; he shall wound the heads over many countries.	κρινεῖ ἐν τοῖς ἔθνεσι, πληρώσει πτώματα, συνθλάσει κεφαλὰς ἐπὶ γῆς πολλῶν.
7	מִ֭נַּחַל בַּדֶּ֣רֶךְ יִשְׁתֶּ֑ה עַל־כֵּ֝֗ן יָרִ֥ים רֹֽאשׁ׃	He shall drink of the brook in the way: therefore shall he lift up the head.	ἐκ χειμάρρου ἐν ὁδῷ πίεται· διὰ τοῦτο ὑψώσει κεφαλήν.

=== Verse 1 ===
The Lord says to my lord: "Sit at my right hand until I make your enemies a footstool for your feet".

The medieval Jewish Masoretes chose to render the second "Lord" in verse 1 as Adoni (אדֹנִ֗י), not Adonai (אֲדֹנָי). Adoni may be translated as "my master" or "my lord", thus rendering the verse as "The Lord spoke to my master". Throughout the Hebrew Bible adoni refers to a human or angelic "master" or "lord". Since David wrote this psalm in the third person, to be sung by the Levites in the Temple in Jerusalem, from a Jewish perspective the Levites would be saying that "the Lord spoke to my master".

However, the King James Version and many subsequent Christian translations (Note: Notable exceptions are the New Revised Standard Edition ("The Lord said to my lord"), the New International Version and New American Bible Revised Edition ("The LORD says to my lord") and the Common English Bible ("What the Lord says to my master").) capitalize the second word "Lord", implying that it refers to Jesus. As the LORD is speaking to another Lord, Henry postulates that "two distinct divine Persons…are involved"—namely, God and Jesus. Henry further claims that in this psalm, David is acknowledging Christ's sovereignty and his (David's) subservience to him. In Matthew 26:64, Jesus quotes this verse during his trial before the Sanhedrin, referring to himself, and Acts 2:34–36 states that this verse was fulfilled in the ascension and exaltation of Christ.

=== Verse 2 ===
The Lord shall send the rod of Your strength out of Zion.
Rule in the midst of Your enemies!

The words Rule in the midst of Your enemies! may be treated as words spoken by the LORD, a further divine promise. They appear as spoken words in some translations, such as the New International Version.

== Sources ==
- Boustan, Ra'anan S. (2005). From Martyr to Mystic: Rabbinic Martyrology and the Making of Merkavah Mysticism. Mohr Siebeck. ISBN 9783161487538.
- Hayward, Robert (2010). Targums and the Transmission of Scripture Into Judaism and Christianity. BRILL. ISBN 9789004179561.
- Lindo, Elias Haim (1842). The Conciliator of R. Manasseh Ben Israel: A Reconcilement of the Apparent Contradictions in Holy Scripture. Vol. 1. Duncan and Malcolm.
- Scherman, Rabbi Nosson (2003). The Complete Artscroll Siddur (3rd ed.). Mesorah Publications, Ltd. ISBN 9780899066509.
- Smith, William (1814). The Reasonableness of Setting Forth the Most Worthy Praise of Almighty God. T. and J. Swords.
- Stout, Stephen Oliver (2014). Preach the Word: A Pauline Theology of Preaching Based on 2 Timothy 4:1–5. Wipf and Stock Publishers. ISBN 9781625648990.
