= Dixit Dominus (Handel) =

1707 psalm setting by George Frideric Handel

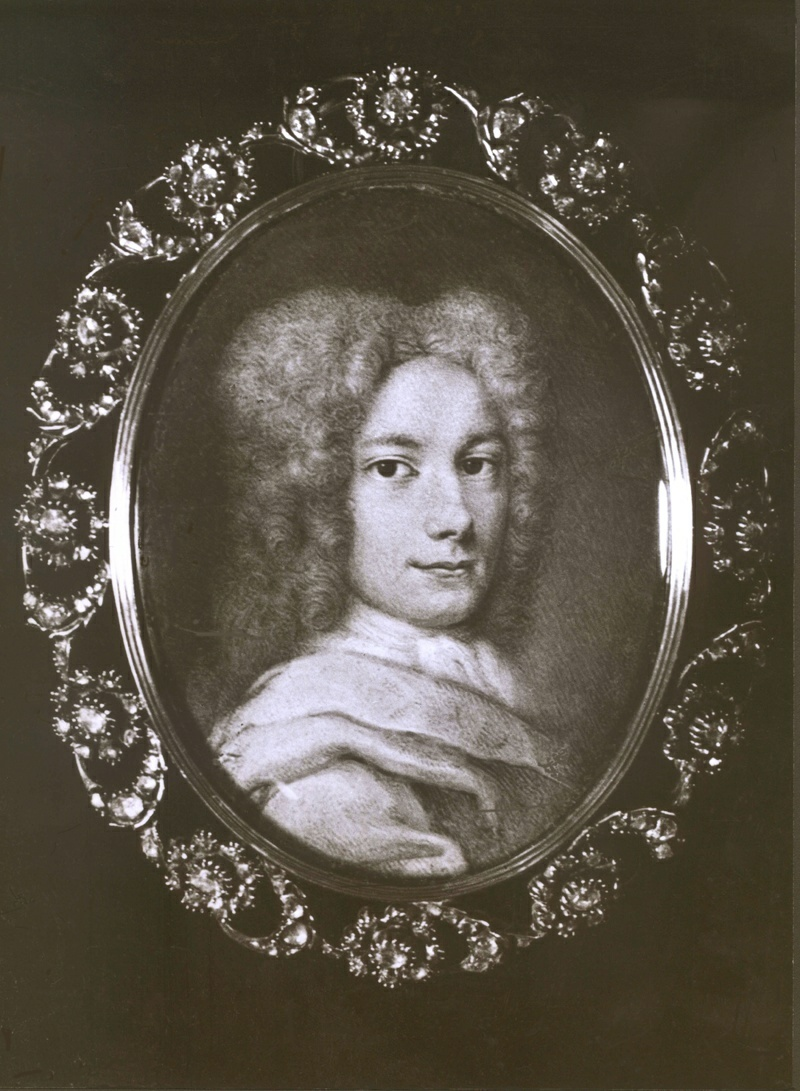
George Frideric Handel c. 1710

Dixit Dominus is a psalm setting by George Frideric Handel (catalogued as HWV 232). It uses the Latin text of Psalm 110 (Vulgate 109), which begins with the words Dixit Dominus ("The Lord Said").

The work was completed in April 1707 while Handel was living in Italy. It is Handel's earliest surviving autograph. The work was written in the Baroque style of the period and is scored for five vocal soloists (SSATB), five-part chorus, strings and continuo. It is thought that the work was first performed on 16 July 1707 in the Church of Santa Maria in Montesanto, under the patronage of the Colonna family.

The score was published in 1867. A typical performance lasts a little over 30 minutes.

== Movements ==
The work has the following movements:

	Type and voice	Text (English)	Text (Latin)
I	Chorus	The Lord said unto my Lord: Sit thou on my right hand, until I make thine enemies thy foot-stool.	Dixit Dominus Domino meo: Sede a dextris meis, donec ponam inimicos tuos scabellum pedum tuorum.
II	Aria (alto solo)	The Lord shall send the rod of thy power out of Sion: be thou ruler, even in the midst among thine enemies.	Virgam virtutis tuae emittet Dominus ex Sion: dominare in medio inimicorum tuorum.
III	Aria (soprano solo)	In the day of thy power shall the people offer thee free-will offerings with an holy worship. From the womb before the morning star have I begotten thee.	Tecum principium in die virtutis tuae splendoribus sanctorum. Ex utero ante luciferum genui te.
IV	Chorus	The Lord swore, and will not repent:	Juravit Dominus et non poenitebit eum:
V	Chorus	Thou art a priest for ever after the order of Melchisedech.	Tu es sacerdos in aeternum secundum ordinem Melchisedech.
VI	Soloists and chorus	The Lord upon thy right hand, shall wound even kings in the day of his wrath.	Dominus a dextris tuis, confregit in die irae suae reges.
VII	Chorus	He shall judge the nations, fill the places with destruction, and shatter the skulls in the land of the many.	Judicabit in nationibus, Implebit ruinas, conquassabit capita in terra multorum.
VIII	Soprano duet and chorus	He shall drink of the brook in the way, therefore shall he lift up his head.	De torrente in via bibet, propterea exaltabit caput.
IX	Chorus	Glory be to the Father, and to the Son, and to the Holy Ghost. As it was in the beginning, is now; and ever shall be, world without end. Amen.	Gloria Patri, et Filio, et Spiritui Sancto, Sicut erat in principio, et nunc, et semper, et in saecula saeculorum. Amen.

== See also ==
- List of compositions by George Frideric Handel
