= Intercession of saints =

Christian doctrine in high church confessions

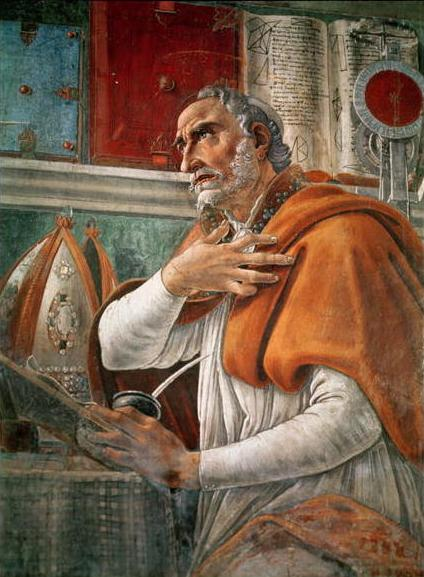
"As we celebrate with our festive gatherings the birthday of this great man, the Lord's forerunner, the blessed John, let us ask for the help of his prayers. Because he is the friend of the bridegroom you see, he can also obtain for us that we can belong to the bridegroom, that we may be thought worthy to obtain his grace." – St. Augustine

The intercession of saints is a Christian doctrine that maintains that saints can intercede for others. The invocation of the saints is the practice of persons requesting saints to intercede for them; the comprecation of saints is the practice in which Christians ask God for a share in the prayers offered by the saints. The practice of the invocation of the saints is held by the Catholic Church, Eastern Orthodox Church, the Assyrian Church of the East, the Oriental Orthodox Churches, and some Lutherans and Anglicans (chiefly those of Evangelical Catholic or Anglo-Catholic churchmanship, respectively). The Lutheran churches and the Anglican Communion accept the doctrine of the intercession of the saints, holding that the saints (living and in heaven) pray for the church; the practice of the comprecation of saints is accepted by these traditions, though the invocation of the saints is generally rejected by these denominations (apart from certain Evangelical Catholics and Anglo-Catholics).

To intercede is to go or come between two parties, to plead before one of them on behalf of the other. In ecclesiastical usage both words are taken in the sense of the intervention primarily of Christ, and secondarily of the Blessed Virgin Mary and the angels and saints, on behalf of men and women.

The 4th-century Apostles' Creed states belief in the communion of saints, which certain churches interpret as supporting the intercession of saints. However, similar practices are controversial in Judaism and Islam. The practice of invoking saints for their intercession can be found in Christian writings from the 3rd century onwards.

== Biblical basis ==
=== Intercession of the living for the living ===
According to the Epistle to the Romans, the living can intercede for the living:

"Now I (Paul) beseech you, brethren, for the Lord Jesus Christ's sake, and for the love of the Spirit, that you strive together with me in your prayers to God for me" (Romans 15:30).

Mary intercedes at the wedding at Cana and occasions Jesus's first miracle. "On the third day a wedding took place at Cana in Galilee. Jesus' mother was there, and Jesus and his disciples had also been invited to the wedding. When the wine was gone, Jesus' mother said to him, 'They have no more wine.' 'Woman, why do you involve me?' Jesus replied. 'My hour has not yet come.' His mother said to the servants, 'Do whatever he tells you'" (John 2:1–5).

When God was displeased by the four men who had attempted to give advice to the patriarch Job, he said to them, "My servant Job will pray for you, and I will accept his prayer and not deal with you according to your folly" (Job 42:8).

Moses says to God, "'Forgive the sin of these people, just as you have pardoned them from the time they left Egypt until now.' The Lord replied, 'I have forgiven them, as you asked'" (Numbers 14:19–20).

The elders of the church can intercede for the sick people. "Is anyone among you sick? Let them call the elders of the church to pray over them and anoint them with oil in the name of the Lord. And the prayer offered in faith will make the sick person well; the Lord will raise them up. If they have sinned, they will be forgiven" (James 5:14–15).

=== Intercession of the living for the dead ===
Some interpret 2 Timothy 1:16–18 to support prayer for the dead: "The Lord give mercy unto the house of Onesiphorus; for he oft refreshed me, and was not ashamed of my chain: But, when he was in Rome, he sought me out very diligently, and found me. The Lord grant unto him that he may find mercy of the Lord in that day: and in how many things he ministered unto me at Ephesus, thou knowest very well."

The deuterocanonical book 2 Maccabees 12:43–46 speaks explicitly about the prayer of the living for the dead: "And making a gathering, he sent twelve thousand drachms of silver to Jerusalem for sacrifice to be offered for the sins of the dead, thinking well and religiously concerning the resurrection, (For if he had not hoped that they that were slain should rise again, it would have seemed superfluous and vain to pray for the dead,) And because he considered that they who had fallen asleep with godliness, had great grace laid up for them. It is therefore a holy and wholesome thought to pray for the dead, that they may be loosed from sins."

=== Intercession of the dead for the living ===
Early Christians derived some of their views from Judaism. "[A]t least some Jews in the first century believed that the angels in heaven were praying for those on earth and presenting their prayers to God. Those in heaven—Onias, Jeremiah, and the angels—were intimately involved in what was happening on earth." In Luke 15:7 Jesus says that those in heaven rejoice when a sinner repents. In Hebrews 12:1, the author refers to them as a "cloud of witnesses". According to Fr. Lawrence, "It was part of the Church's faith in the first century that those in heaven interceded for those on earth."

Thomas Aquinas quotes Revelation 8:4: "And the smoke of the incense of the prayers of the saints ascended up before God from the hand of the angel."

Both those for and against the intercession of saints quote Job 5:1: "Call if you will, but who will answer you? To which of the holy ones will you turn?"

Christ's parable of the rich man and Lazarus in Luke 16:19–31 indicates the ability of the dead to pray for the living.

The intercession of the dead for the living is shown in 2 Maccabees 15:14–17; an intercession on behalf of Israel by the late high priest Onias III plus that of Jeremiah, the prophet who died almost 400 years earlier. "And Onias spoke, saying, 'This is a man who loves the brethren and prays much for the people and the holy city, Jeremiah, the prophet of God.'"

== Teaching by Christian denomination ==
=== Orthodox ===
Intercessory prayer to saints plays an important role in the Eastern Orthodox Church and Oriental Orthodox Churches, such as the Coptic Orthodox Church.

=== Catholic ===
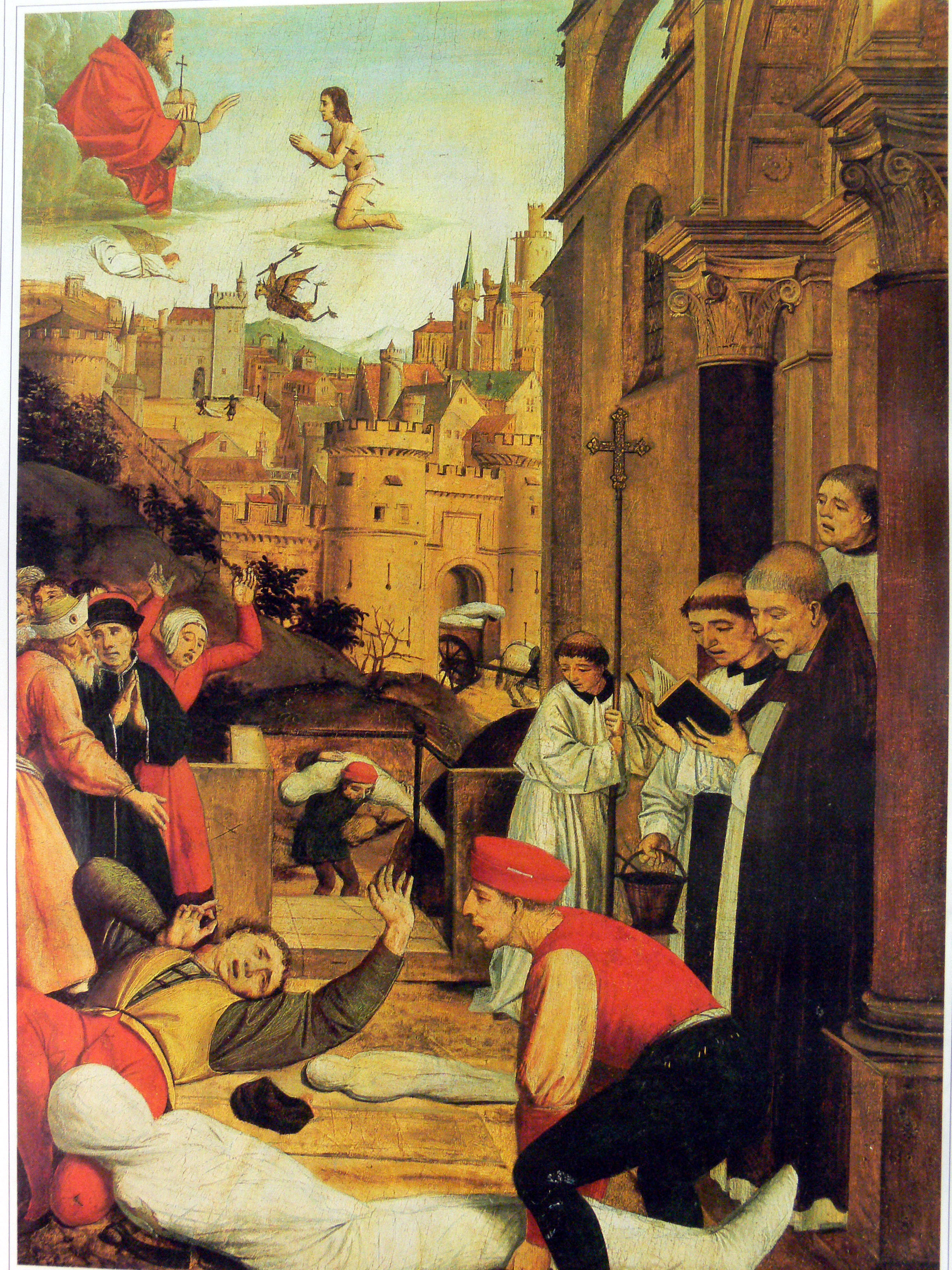
Saint Sebastian pleads with Jesus (top left) for the life of a gravedigger afflicted by plague during the Plague of Justinian (Josse Lieferinxe, c. 1497 – c. 1499)

Catholicism teaches the intercession of the saints, the doctrine that the saints—both alive and in heaven—pray for the church. This is related to the doctrine of the Communion of saints, which is mentioned in the Apostle's Creed. In conjunction with the doctrine of the intercession of the saints, the Catholic Church teaches the comprecation of saints—that Christians can ask God for a share in the prayers of the saints—as well as the invocation of saints—that Christians can invoke saints directly as intercessors in their prayers. Some of the early basis for this was the belief that martyrs passed immediately into the presence of God and could obtain graces and blessings for others, which naturally and immediately led to their direct invocation. A further reinforcement was derived from the cult of the angels which, while pre-Christian in its origin, was heartily embraced by the faithful of the sub-Apostolic age.

Gregory of Nazianzus said of his deceased father: "I am well assured that his intercession is of more avail now than was his instruction in former days, since he is closer to God, now that he has shaken off his bodily fetters, and freed his mind from the clay which obscured it"; and Jerome wrote: "If the Apostles and Martyrs, while still in the body, can pray for others, at a time when they must still be anxious for themselves, how much more after their crowns, victories, and triumphs are won! One man, Moses, obtains from God pardon for six hundred thousand men in arms; and Stephen, the imitator of the Lord, and the first martyr in Christ, begs forgiveness for his persecutors; and shall their power be less after having begun to be with Christ?"

The doctrine of intercession and invocation was set forth by the Council of Trent, which teaches that "... the saints who reign together with Christ offer up their own prayers to God for men. It is good and useful suppliantly to invoke them, and to have recourse to their prayers, aid, and help for obtaining benefits from God, through His Son Jesus Christ our Lord, Who alone is our Redeemer and Saviour".

Intercessory prayer to saintly persons who have not yet been beatified can also practiced by individuals, and evidence of miracles produced as a result of such prayer is very commonly produced during the formal process of beatification and canonization.

According to the Catechism of the Catholic Church:

956 The intercession of the saints. "Being more closely united to Christ, those who dwell in heaven fix the whole Church more firmly in holiness. ...They do not cease to intercede with the Father for us, as they proffer the merits which they acquired on earth through the one mediator between God and men, Christ Jesus. ...So by their fraternal concern is our weakness greatly helped."

— Catechism of the Catholic Church – The Communion of Saints

Some Catholic scholars have assessed invocation and intercession of the saints with a critical view toward the medieval tendencies of imagining the saints in heaven distributing favors to whom they will and instead seeing in proper devotion to the saints a means of response to God's activity in us through these creative models of Christ-likeness.

In ecumenical conversations, agreement has been reached that "asking the saints to intercede for us expresses the solidarity of the church wherein all are meant to be of mutual support to one another. Analogous to what is done among living persons, the request directed toward a saint to pray for us is a precise expression of solidarity in Jesus Christ, through the ages and across various modes of human existence".

=== Lutheran ===
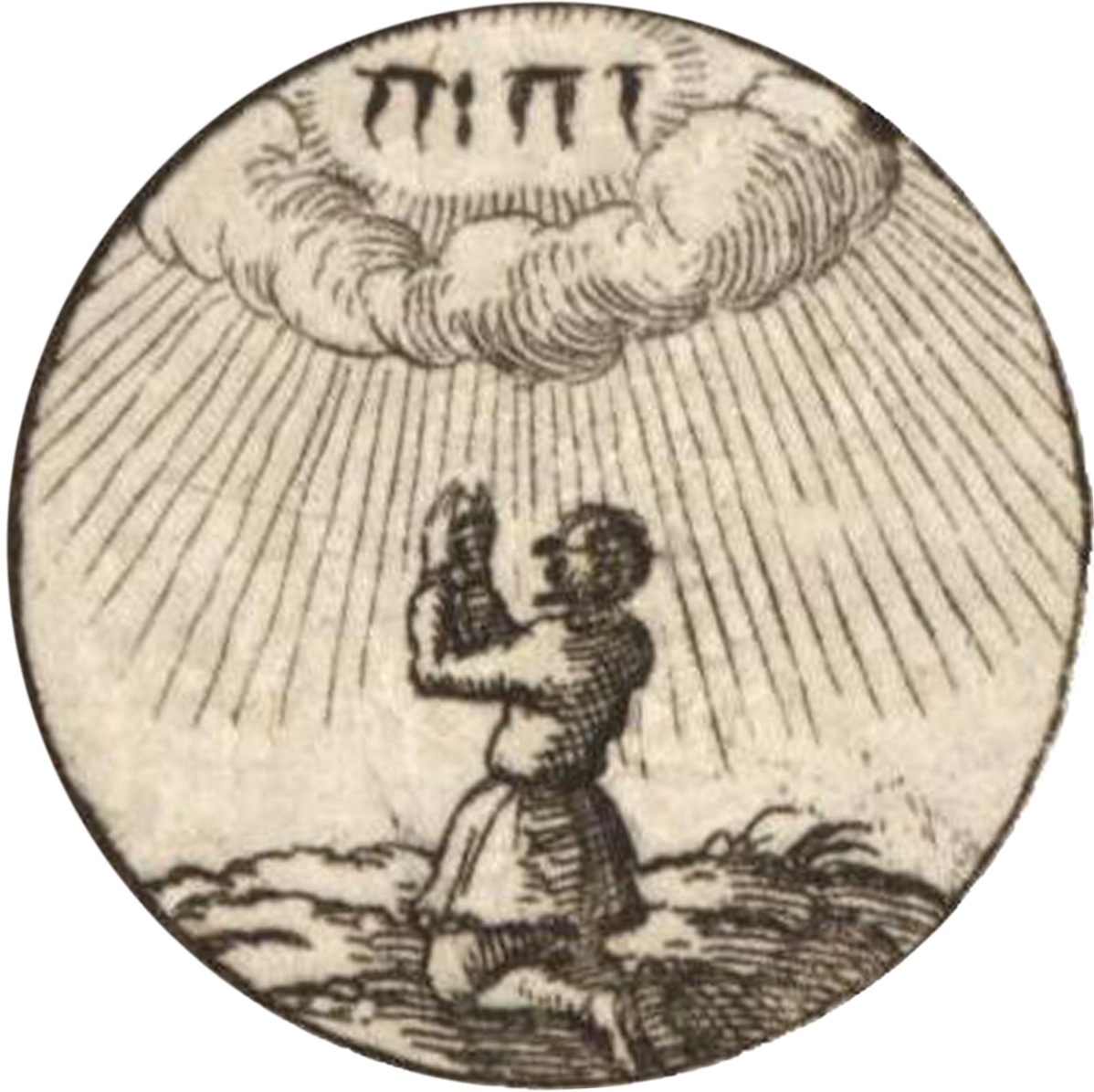
"Scripture does not teach calling on the saints or pleading for help from them. For it sets before us Christ alone as mediator, atoning sacrifice, high priest, and intercessor."—Augsburg Confession (Lutheran), Article XXI

Evangelical Lutheranism affirms belief in the communion of saints, which is named in the Apostle's Creed. The Evangelical Lutheran confessions approve honouring the saints by thanking God for examples of his mercy, by using the saints as examples for strengthening the believers' faith, and by imitating their faith and other virtues. Evangelical Lutheranism broadly accepts the intercession of the saints, though it rejects the invocation of the saints. Although the Augsburg Confession rejects invoking the saints to ask for their help, it affirms that "they pray for the Church universal in general" in life and in heaven. The Augsburg Confession emphasizes that Christ is the only Mediator between God and man, and that He is therefore the only One to and through Whom Christians ought to pray. (Note: The intercession of saints was criticized in the Augsburg Confession, Article XXI: Of the Worship of the Saints. This criticism was refuted by the Catholic side in the Confutation, which in turn was refuted by the Lutheran side in the Apology to the Augsburg Confession.) Though most Lutheran denominations do not, the Evangelical Community Church-Lutheran—a Lutheran denomination with Evangelical Catholic churchmanship—affirmed a belief in the invocation of the saints.

The Apology of the Augsburg Confession teaches that "blessed Mary prays for the Church". With regard to the Blessed Virgin Mary specifically, Martin Luther advocated the use of the pre-Council of Trent version of the Hail Mary as a sign of reverence for and devotion to her. The 1522 Betbüchlein (Prayer Book) of Lutheranism thus retained the Ave Maria.

=== Reformed ===
The Reformed churches, which hold to Calvinist theology, understand the communion of saints mentioned in the Apostles' Creed to consist of all believers, including those who have died, but invocation of departed saints is regarded as a transgression of the First Commandment. Specifically, John Calvin in the Institutes of the Christian Religion, believes that the Bible demonstrates that the central principle of worship is on the direct invocation of God. Calvin quotes Psalm 44, "If we have forgotten the name of our God, or stretched out our hands to a strange god, shall not God search this out?” The next principle Calvin brings out from the Bible is that all prayer must be done only through the intercession of Christ. Calvin teaches that in Hebrews 13:15, Christians are reminded that "without the intervention of his priesthood our lips are not pure enough to celebrate the name of God". Because of the intercession of Christ, Calvin says that Christians can join the Apostle Paul and "Pray without ceasing;" (1 Thess:5:17). In contrast, Calvin believes that the practice of praying to saints is a demonstration of "distrust, because they are either not contented with Christ as an intercessor or have altogether robbed him of this honour".

=== Anglican ===
Reflecting the Reformed theology of Thomas Cranmer—the guiding figure of the Protestant Reformation in England—the Thirty-nine Articles (1563), which became a confession of faith for historic Anglicanism, condemn "invocation of saints" as "a fond thing, vainly invented, and grounded upon no warranty of Scripture, but rather repugnant to the Word of God" (Article XXII). Theologians within the Anglican Communion make a clear distinction between a "Romish" doctrine concerning the invocation of saints and what they view as the "Patristic" doctrine of intercession of the saints, permitting the latter, but forbidding the former. Anglicanism has affirmed the 'comprecation of the saints' (termed by Anglican bishop William Forbes as advocation of the saints), which is “the practice of asking God Himself for a share in the prayers of the saints”. Anglicans believe that comprecation “is a truly primitive and Catholic practice, found in the ancient Liturgies and open to no possible theological objection. It affirms the truth that the saints do pray for us, it meets the human need for active fellowship with the departed and it brings into the sphere of practical religion the communion of saints as including not only those on earth but those beyond the veil.”

Anglican theologian James Clark writes that "In comprecation, therefore, we can remain mindful of that portion of the communion of saints already in Paradise, while simultaneously upholding the biblical principle that we are to address God alone in our prayers and petitions, avoiding altogether any creeping danger of idolatry…" and that “we can rightfully avail ourselves of their prayers, not by asking the saints directly to pray for us, but by praying to God that He would bless us through their intercessions”

=== Methodist ===
Article XIV of the Methodist Articles of Religion from 1784, echoing the Anglican Thirty-nine Articles, rejects invocation of saints by declaring the doctrine "a fond thing, vainly invented, and grounded upon no warrant of Scripture, but rather repugnant to the Word of God".

=== Baptist ===
The Baptist churches reject the intercession of the dead for the living, but they are in favour of the intercession of the living for the living according to Romans 15:30 (cf. intercessory prayer).

== Parallels in other religions ==
=== Judaism ===
There is evidence of a Jewish belief in intercession, both in the form of the paternal blessings passed down from Abraham to his children, and 2 Maccabees, where Judas Maccabaeus sees the dead Onias and Jeremiah giving blessing to the Jewish army. In ancient Judaism, it was also popular to pray for intercession from Michael in spite of the rabbinical prohibition against appealing to angels as intermediaries between God and his people. There were two prayers written beseeching him as the prince of mercy to intercede in favor of Israel: one composed by Eliezer ha-Kalir, and the other by Judah ben Samuel he-Hasid. Those who oppose this practice feel that to God alone may prayers be offered.

In modern times, one of the greatest divisions in Jewish theology (hashkafa) is over the issue of whether one can beseech the help of a tzadik – an extremely righteous individual. The main conflict is over a practice of beseeching a tzadik who has already died to make intercession before the Almighty. This practice is common mainly among Chasidic Jews, but also found in varying degrees among other usually Chareidi communities. It strongest opposition is found largely among sectors of Modern Orthodox Judaism, Dor Daim and Talmide haRambam, and among aspects of the Litvish Chareidi community. Those who oppose this practice usually do so over the problem of idolatry, as Jewish Law strictly prohibits making use of a mediator (melitz) or agent (sarsur) between oneself and the Almighty.

The perspectives of those Jewish groups opposed to the use of intercessors is usually softer in regard to beseeching the Almighty alone merely in the "merit" (zechut) of a tzadik.

Those Jews who support the use of intercessors claim that their beseeching of the tzadik is not prayer or worship, or alternatively that they are still praying to God and through God, but secondarily communicating with the tzadik. The conflict between the groups is essentially over what constitutes prayer, worship, a mediator (melitz), and an agent (sarsur).

=== Islam ===
Tawassul is the practice of using someone as a means or an intermediary in a supplication directed towards God. An example of this would be such: "O my Lord, help me with [such and such need] due to the love I have for Your Prophet."

Some Shi'a practice seeking intercession from saints, in particular from Muhammad's son-in-law, Ali and Ali's son, Husayn. According to Muhammad al-Baqir, Walayah toward Ali is viewed as the essential criterion of both faith and salvation.

=== Mandaeism ===
The names of uthras (celestial beings in the World of Light) in Mandaean prayers, such as the canonical prayers of the Qulasta. Some of these prayers, such as the Asut Malkia (Qulasta prayer 105) and Ṭabahatan prayer (Qulasta prayer 170), have long lists of ancestors, uthras, and prophets such as Adam and John the Baptist.

=== Serer religion ===
In the religion of the Serer people of Senegal, the Gambia and Mauritania, some of their ancient dead are taken as, in an analogy, holy saints, called Pangool in the Serer language. These ancient ancestors act as interceders between the living world and their supreme deity Roog.

== See also ==
- Efficacy of prayer
- Intercession of Christ
- Intercession of the Spirit
- Intercession of the Theotokos
- Patron saint
- Shrine
- Slava (patron saint day)
- Veneration
