= Session of Christ =

Christian doctrine

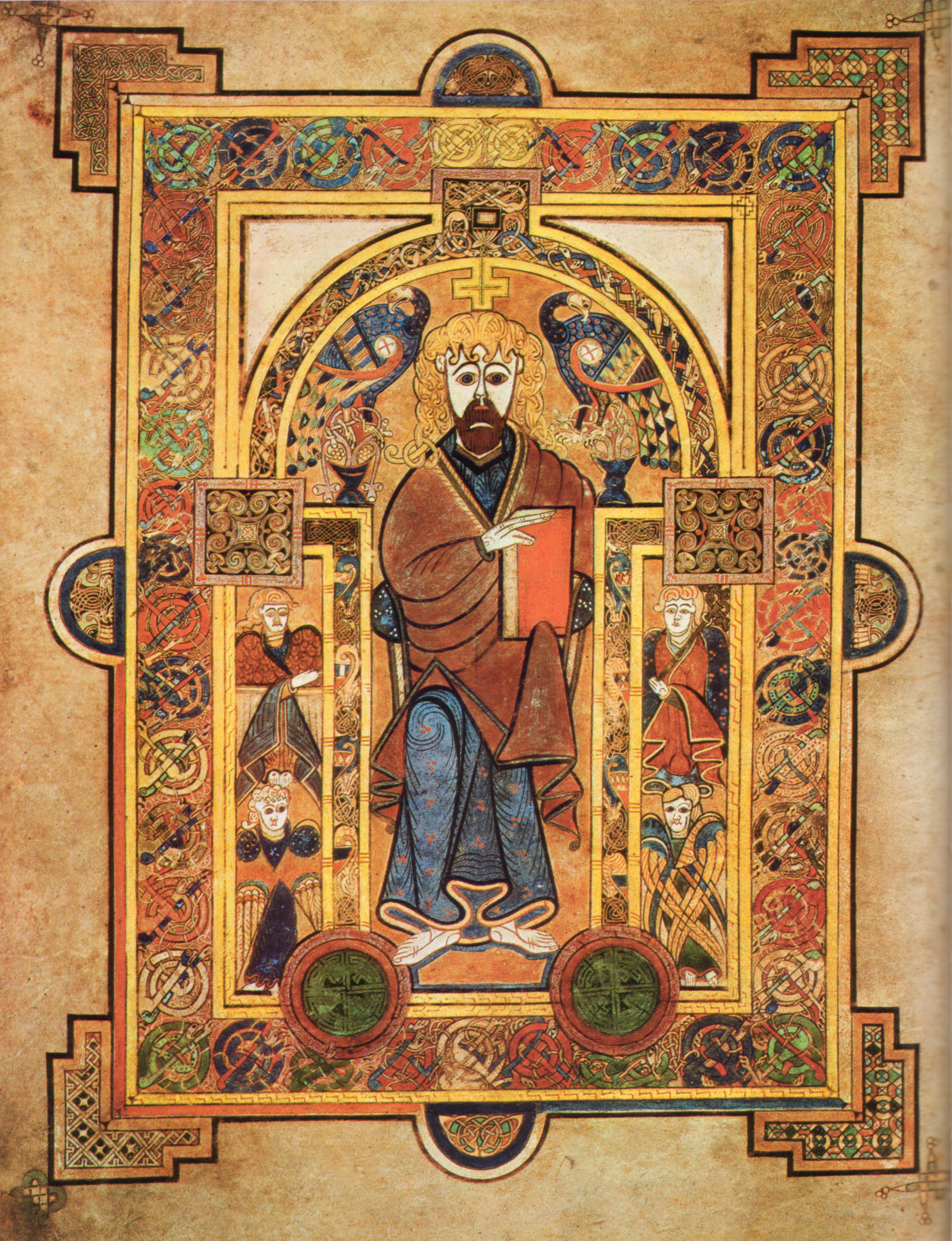
Illustration from the Book of Kells of Christ enthroned. The central significance of Christ's heavenly session is his reign as King.

The Session of Christ or heavenly session is a Christian doctrine stating that Jesus is seated at the right hand of God the Father in Heaven—the word "session" is an archaic noun meaning "sitting". Although the word formerly meant "the act of sitting down", its meaning is somewhat broader in current English usage, and is used to refer to a sitting for various reasons, such as a teaching session, or a court or council being in session. The New Testament also depicts Jesus as standing and walking in Heaven, but the Session of Christ has special theological significance because of its connection to the role of Christ as King. The Session of Christ is one of the doctrines specifically mentioned in the Apostles' Creed, where "sitteth on the right hand of God the Father Almighty" immediately follows the statement of the Ascension.

== Etymology ==
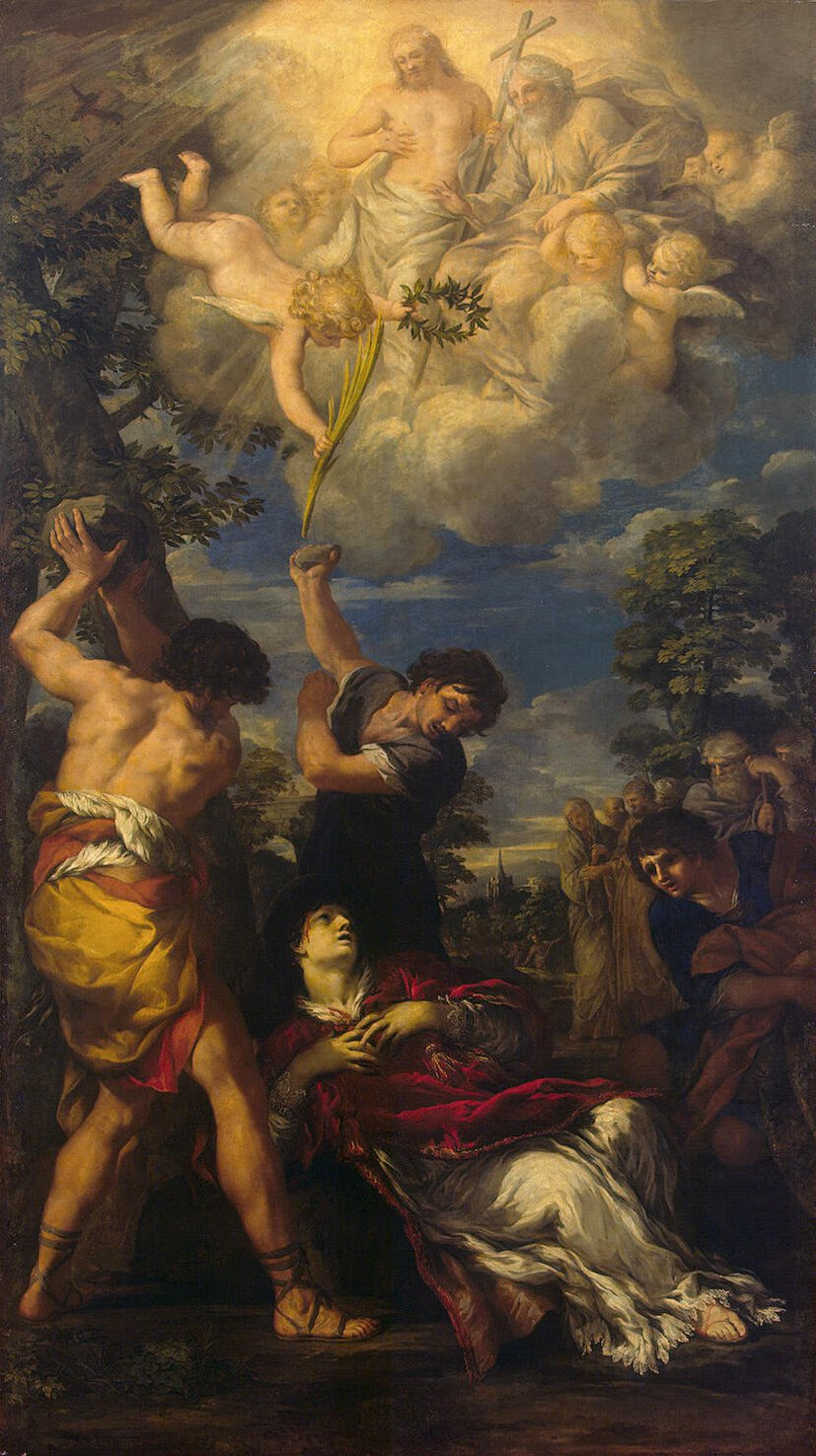
Pietro da Cortona, Stoning of Saint Stephen, 1660. Acts 7:55 says that, as he was dying, Saint Stephen saw Jesus standing at the right hand of God.

Session is an archaic noun meaning sitting. Wayne Grudem notes that the word formerly meant "the act of sitting down," but that it no longer has that sole meaning in ordinary English usage today. This language is used in Psalm 110:1 and Hebrews 10:12. In Acts 7:55, however, Stephen sees Jesus standing at the right hand of God. This may represent Jesus "rising momentarily from the throne of glory to greet his proto-martyr," standing as a witness to vindicate Stephen's testimony, or preparing to return.

In Revelation 2:1, on the other hand, Jesus is referred to as walking among the seven golden lamp-stands. Robert H. Mounce suggests that since these lamp-stands represent the seven churches of Asia, Jesus's motion indicates that he is "present in their midst and aware of their activities."

== Biblical references ==
According to Acts 2:33, after Jesus's resurrection and ascension, he was "exalted to the right hand of God." Preaching on the Day of Pentecost, Peter saw Jesus' exaltation as a fulfilment of Psalm 110:1, "The LORD says to my Lord: "Sit at my right hand until I make your enemies a footstool for your feet." In the Bible, the "right hand" is the special place of honour.

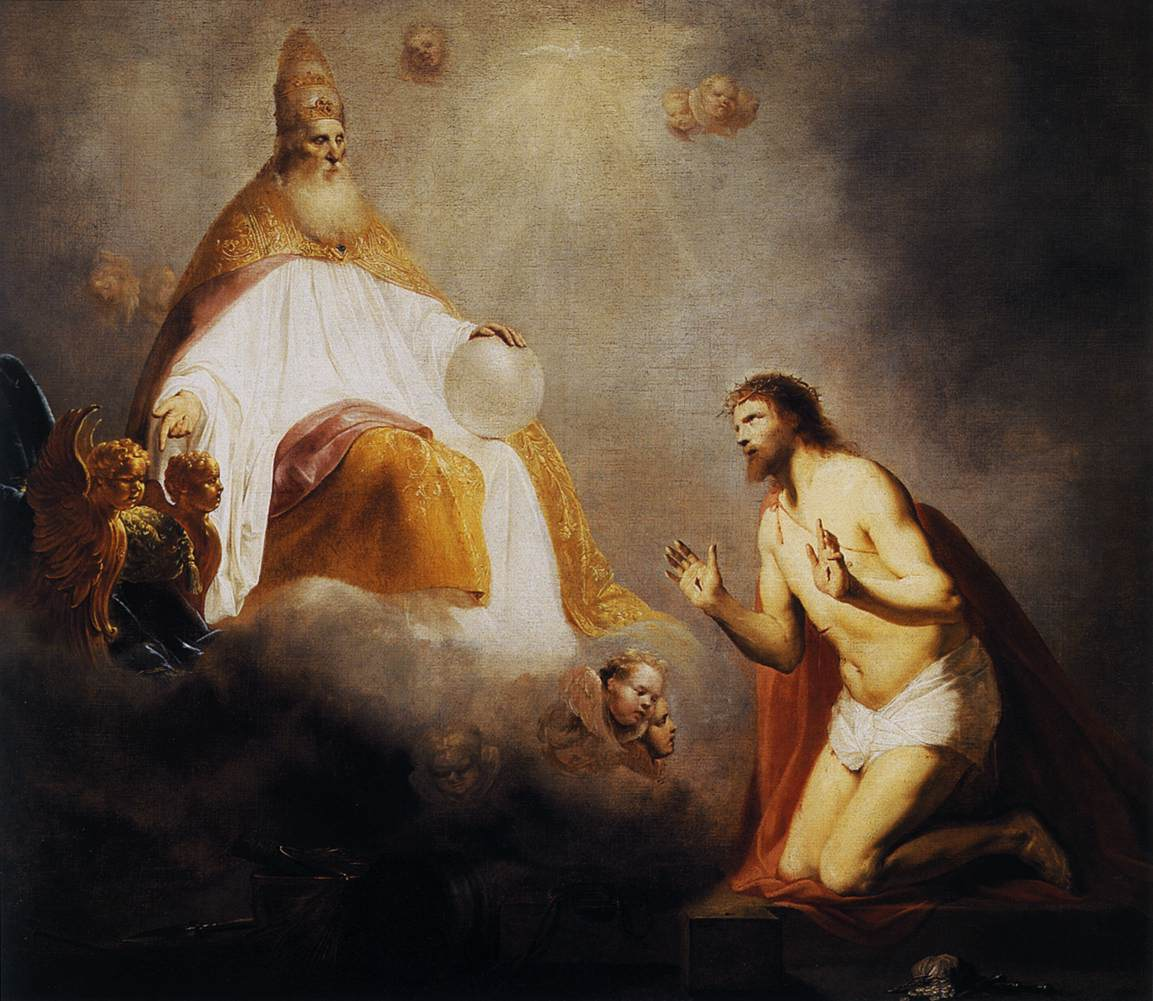
Pieter de Grebber, God Inviting Christ to Sit on the Throne at His Right Hand, 1645. This invitation from Psalm 110:1 is quoted in the Book of Acts as being fulfilled in Christ's heavenly session.

The idea of Christ's heavenly session appears a second time in the account of Peter's preaching in the Book of Acts. In Acts 5:31 Peter says that God exalted Jesus, "to his own right hand" (NIV), although Louis Berkhof notes that the dative τῇ δεξιᾷ may have to be taken in the instrumental sense ("by his own right hand") rather than a local sense ("at his own right hand").

The heavenly session was important to other writers of the New Testament. In the Epistle to the Hebrews, Hebrews 10:12, Jesus "sat down at the right hand of God," after he had "offered for all time one sacrifice for sins." As in Acts 2, the language of Psalm 110 is used, the next verse saying that Jesus is waiting "for his enemies to be made his footstool." Other New Testament passages that speak of Christ as being at God's right hand are Ephesians 1:20 (God seated Christ "at his right hand in the heavenly realms") and 1 Peter 3:22 (Jesus has "gone into heaven and is at God's right hand").

In Matthew 26:64 and Mark 14:62 Jesus says to Caiaphas, "you will see the Son of Man seated at the right hand of Power". This is a reference to Daniel 7:13, in which Daniel sees a vision of "one like a son of man" coming to the Ancient of Days.

== Theological significance ==
=== Exaltation of Jesus ===
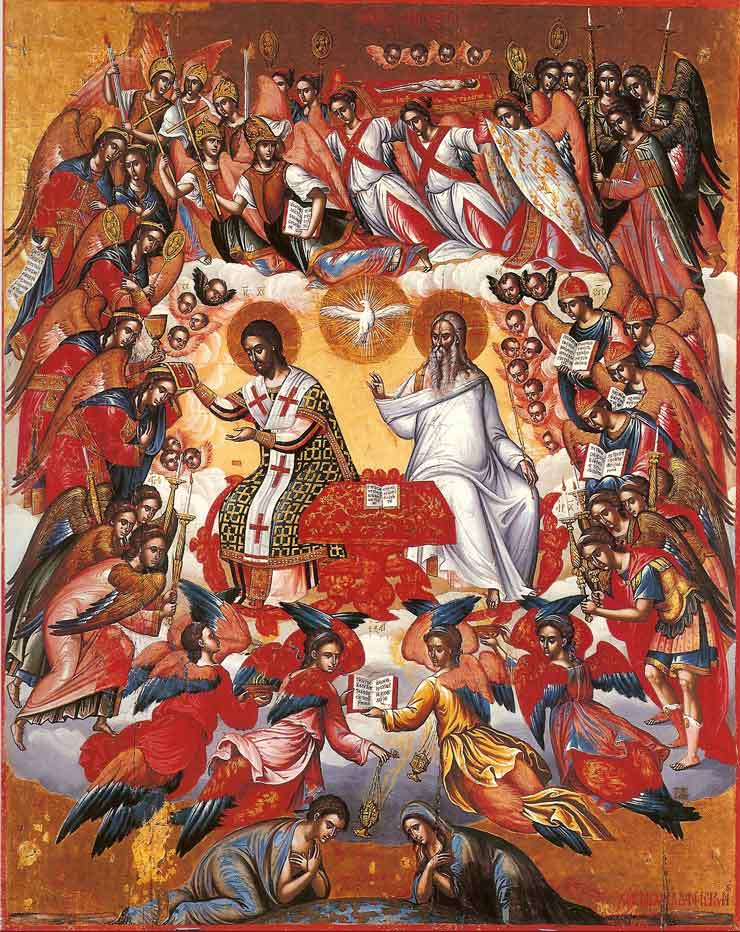
Michael Damaskinos Icon of the Holy Liturgy, from the 16th-century Cretan school, showing Western stylistic influence

In the Bible, to be at the right side "is to be identified as being in the special place of honor," and thus "the full participation of the risen Christ in God's honor and glory is emphasized by his being at God's right hand."

The heavenly session is often connected to the enthronement of Christ as King. The Catechism of the Catholic Church says that "being seated at the Father's right hand signifies the inauguration of the Messiah's kingdom." Berkhof notes that, in his session, Christ is "publicly inaugurated as God-man, and as such receives the government of the Church and of heaven and earth, and enters solemnly upon the actual administration of the power committed to Him."

However, in Hebrews 10:12 it is Jesus's priestly office that is in view. The session refers to the completed nature of the work, in the same way that "a human being will sit down at the completion of a large work to enjoy the satisfaction of having accomplished it." F. F. Bruce argues that:

The presence of Messiah at God's right hand means that for His people there was now a way of access to God more immediate and heart-satisfying than the obsolete temple ritual had ever been able to provide.

Karl Barth says that the session of Christ is "the first and the last thing that matters for our existence in time," and that:

Whatever prosperity or defeat may occur in our space, whatever may become and pass away, there is one constant, one thing that remains and continues, this sitting of His at the right hand of God the Father.

=== Origins ===
The New Testament writings contend that the resurrection was "the beginning of His exalted life" (Note: Novakovic quotes C.E.B. Cranfield, The Epistle to the Romans, 1:62.) as Christ and Lord. Jesus is the "firstborn of the dead," prōtotokos, the first to be raised from the dead, and thereby acquiring the "special status of the firstborn as the preeminent son and heir." According to Gregory Beale,

"Firstborn" refers to the high, privileged position that Christ has as a result of the resurrection from the dead [...] Christ has gained such a sovereign position over the cosmos, not in the sense that he is recognized as the first-created being of all creation or as the origin of creation, but in the sense that he is the inaugurator of the new creation by means of his resurrection.

Larry Hurtado notes that soon after his death, Jesus was called Lord (Kyrios), which "associates him in astonishing ways with God." The term Lord reflected the belief that God had exalted to a divine status "at God's 'right hand'." The worship of God as expressed in the phrase "call upon the name of the Lord [Yahweh]" was also applied to Jesus, invocating his name "in corporate worship and in the wider devotional pattern of Christian believers (e.g., baptism, exorcism, and healing)."

According to Hurtado, powerful religious experiences were an indispensable factor in the emergence of Christ-devotion. (Note: See also Andrew Chester (2007), Messiah and Exaltation: Jewish Messianic and Visionary Traditions and New Testament Christology, Mohr Siebeck; and Larry Huratdo (December 11, 2012), “Early High Christology”: A Recent Assessment of Scholarly Debate.) Those experiences "seem to have included visions of (and/or ascents to) God's heaven, in which the glorified Christ was seen in an exalted position." (Note: These visions may mostly have appeared during corporate worship. Johan Leman contends that the communal meals provided a context in which participants entered a state of mind in which the presence of Jesus was felt.) Those experiences were interpreted in the framework of God's redemptive purposes, as reflected in the scriptures, in a "dynamic interaction between devout, prayerful searching for, and pondering over, scriptural texts and continuing powerful religious experiences." This initiated a "new devotional pattern unprecedented in Jewish monotheism," that is, the worship of Jesus next to God, giving Jesus a central place because his ministry, and its consequences, had a strong impact on his early followers. Revelations, including those visions, but also inspired and spontaneous utterances, and "charismatic exegesis" of the Jewish scriptures, convinced them that this devotion was commanded by God.

== Usage ==
=== In the creeds ===
The Apostles' Creed says of Jesus that "He ascended into heaven, and sitteth on the right hand of God the Father Almighty" (1662 Book of Common Prayer). The words "and sitteth on the right hand of the Father," do not appear in the Nicene Creed of 325, but are present in the Niceno-Constantinopolitan Creed of 381, and are retained in all English versions of the Nicene Creed.

=== Use in hymnody ===
The heavenly session is referred to in many hymns, such as Charles Wesley's hymn Rejoice, the Lord is King:

He sits at God’s right hand till all His foes submit,
And bow to His command, and fall beneath His feet:
Lift up your heart, lift up your voice;
Rejoice, again I say, rejoice!

Once in Royal David's City, a Christmas carol, contrasts Christ's humble birth with his heavenly session; the last verse begins:

Not in that poor lowly stable,
With the oxen standing by,
We shall see Him; but in Heaven,
Set at God’s right hand on high;

== See also ==
- Christ in Majesty
- Christology
- Intercession of Christ

== Sources ==
- Hurtado, Larry (2005), Lord Jesus Christ. Devotion to Jesus in Earliest Christianity, Eerdmans
- Leman, Johan (2015), Van totem tot verrezen Heer. Een historisch-antropologisch verhaal, Pelckmans
- Novakovic, Lidija (2014), Raised from the Dead According to Scripture: The Role of the Old Testament in the Early Christian Interpretations of Jesus' Resurrection, A&C Black
