= Dixit Dominus (Vivaldi) =

Psalm settings composed by Antonio Vivaldi

- by Antonio Vivaldi
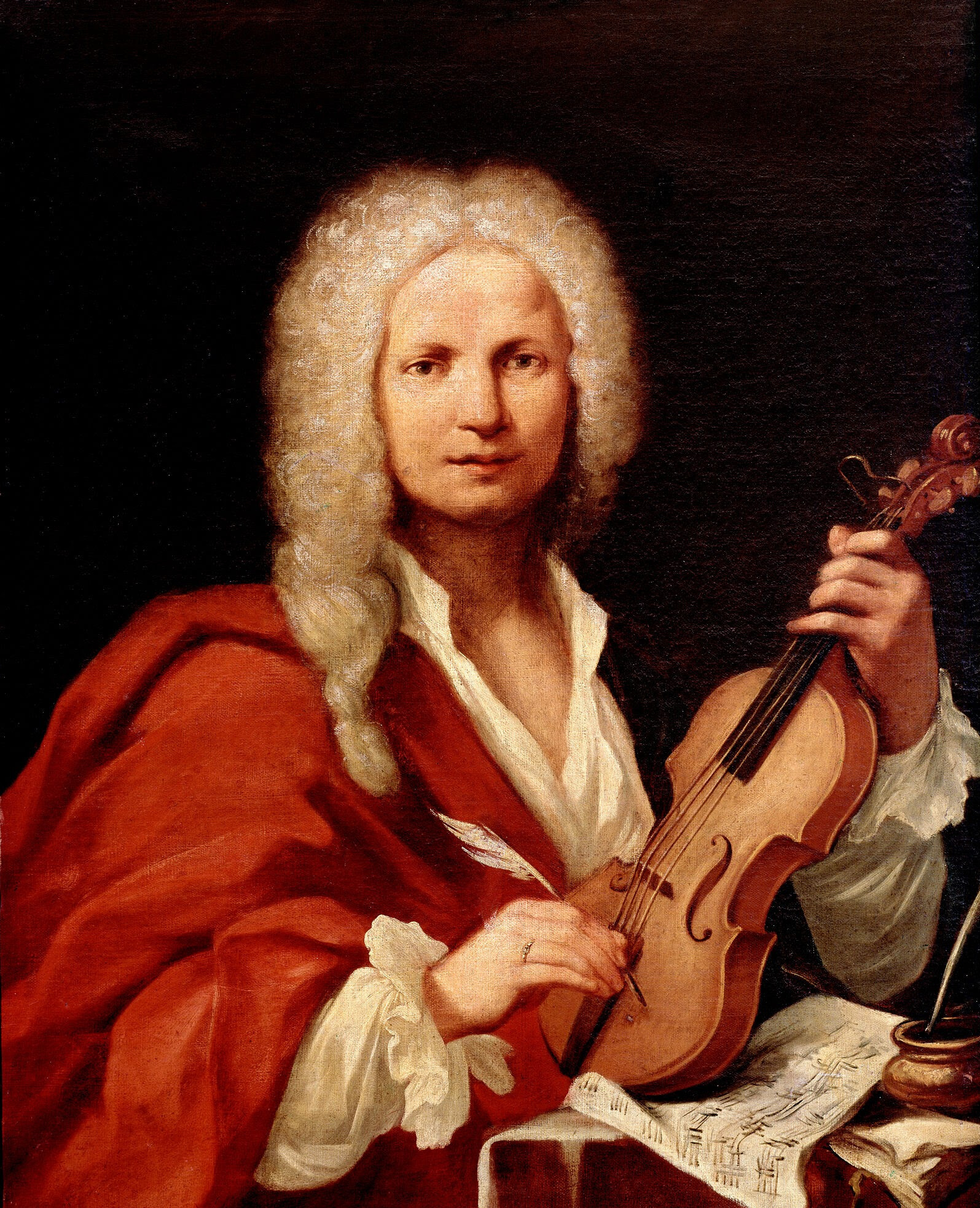
- Probable portrait of Vivaldi, c. 1723
- Key: D major
- Catalogue: RV 594
- Text: Psalm 110
- Language: Latin
- Movements: ten
- Scoring: five soloists; two SATB choirs; orchestra

Antonio Vivaldi composed three settings of the Dixit Dominus (The Lord said [unto my Lord]), the Latin version of Psalm 110. They include a setting in ten movements for five soloists, double choir and orchestra, RV 594, another setting in eleven movements for five voices, five-part choir and orchestra, RV 595, and a recently discovered setting in eleven movements for five soloists, choir and orchestra, RV 807, which had been attributed to Baldassare Galuppi. Dixit Dominus, RV 594, has been regarded as one of Vivaldi's "most significant sacred works".

== History ==
There are three recorded compositions of Dixit Dominus – Psalm 110 in Latin (or Psalm 109 in the Vulgate) – by Vivaldi. Each is an extended setting of the vespers psalm for five soloists, choir and orchestra; one only having been identified as his work in 2005.

Psalm 110 is regularly included in vespers services, usually as the opening psalm. Dixit Dominus has been said to be one of his "most significant sacred works".

=== RV 594 ===
Vivaldi's best-known setting, catalogued as RV 594, is structured in ten movements, eight psalm verses and two movements for the doxology. Set in D major, it is scored for two sopranos, alto, tenor and bass soloists, two SATB choirs and orchestras. The first choir (Coro I) is accompanied by two oboes, two trumpets (with timpani), two violins, viola, organ and basso continuo, while the second choir (Coro II) is accompanied by strings, organ and continuo. The duration is given as 25 minutes.

Carus-Verlag published a critical edition in 2005.

=== Music of RV 594 ===
The ten movements are:

1. Dixit Dominus, Allegro, D major, common time, double choirs, orchestras with two organ soloists
2. Donec ponam inimicos tuos, Allegro, B minor, common time, double choirs, strings
3. Virgam virtutis tuae, Andante – Allegro molto, G major, common time, two sopranos, strings
4. Tecum principium, Andante, E minor, 3/4, alto, strings
5. Juravit Dominus, Presto, C major, common time, double choir, strings
6. Dominus a dextris tuis, Allegro, C major, common time, tenor and bass, strings
7. Judicabit in nationibus, Largo, D major, common time, double choir and orchestras
8. De torrente, Andante, E minor, common time, soprano, strings
9. Gloria Patri, Allegro, D major, common time, double choirs, orchestras with two organ soloists
10. Sicut erat in principio, Allegro D major, common time, double choirs, orchestras

The first and ninth movement, one beginning the psalm, the other the doxology, rely on the same musical themes in the same key, for a frame of "festive splendour". The second movement depicts the fall of God's enemies in descending lines. The third movement, a duet, features echo effects. In movement 7, regarded as a climax, Vivaldi made use of the two choirs in the tradition of Venetian polychoral style combined with elements from his operatic writing. The final movement is a masterful complex piece in polyphony based on six themes.

=== RV 595 ===
Dixit Dominus
- Key: D major
- Catalogue: RV 595
- Movements: eleven
- Scoring: five soloists; SSATB choirs↑; orchestra

The setting discovered next was catalogued as RV 595. Also in D major, it is structured in eleven movements, eight psalm verses and three movements for the doxology. It is scored for two sopranos, alto, tenor and bass soloists, a choir which also calls for divided soprano in some movements, and an orchestra comprising strings, two oboes, trumpet, and continuo bass.

The eleven movements are:

1. Dixit Dominus Domino meo, D major, common time, choir, strings, oboes and trumpet, continuo bass
2. Donec ponam inimicos tuos, B minor, 3/4, choir and orchestra
3. Virgam virtutis tuae, G major, common time, soprano solo, strings, continuo bass
4. Tecum principium, A minor, 3/8, two soprano solos, two cellos, continuo bass
5. Juravit Dominus, E minor/G major, 3/2, choir, strings, continuo bass
6. Dominus a dextris tuis, B minor, common time, soprano solo, strings, continuo bass
7. Judicabit in nationibus, D major, common time, choir, strings, trumpet, continuo bass
8. De torrente in via bibet, E minor, common time, alto solo, strings
9. Gloria Patri, et Filio, D major, 3/8, alto, tenor and bass solos, continuo bass
10. Sicut erat in principio, D major, common time, choir, strings, oboes and trumpet, continuo bass
11. Et in saecula saeculorum, D major, 3/4, choir, strings, oboes, continuo bass

=== RV 807 ===
Dixit Dominus
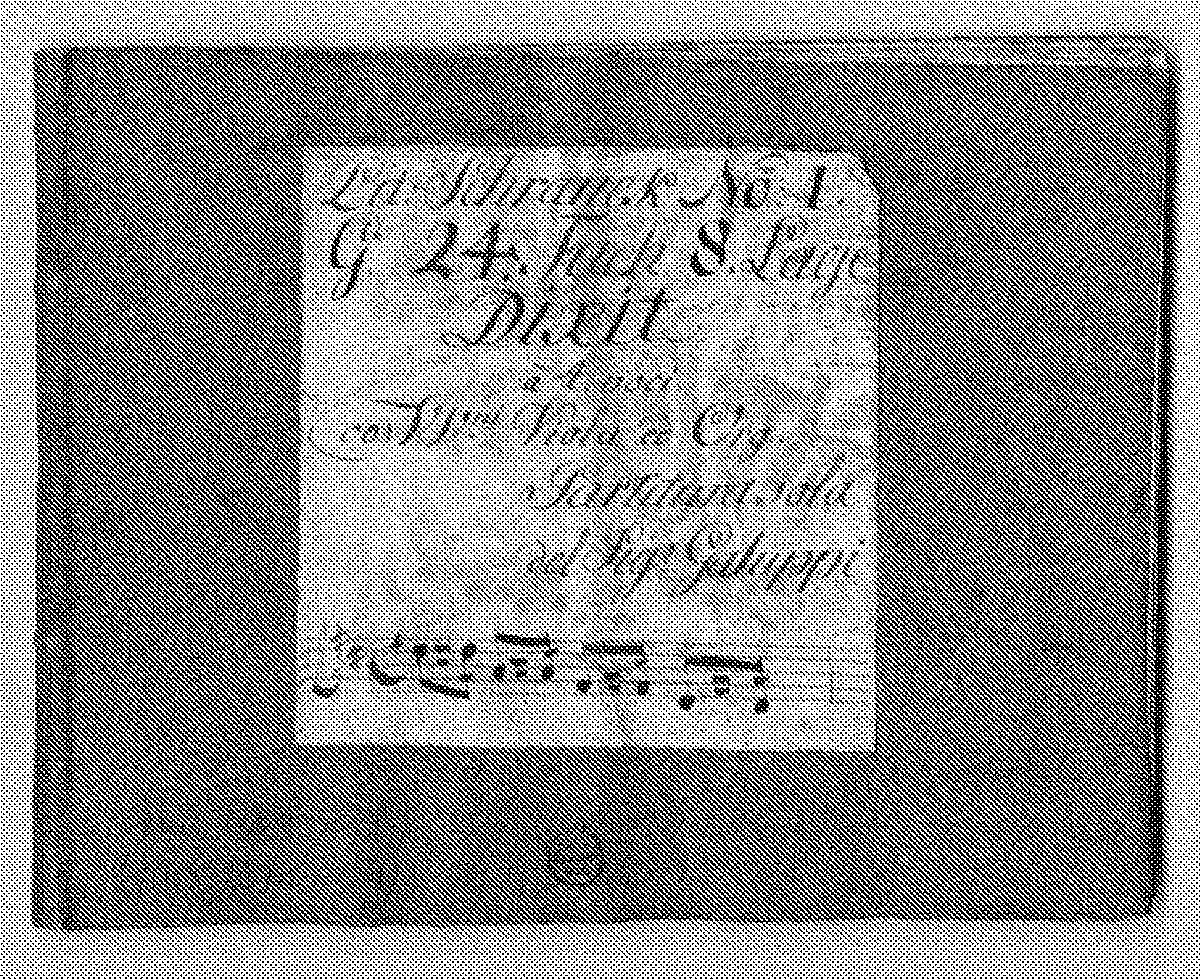
- Dixit Dominus RV 807, Dresden's transcript
- Key: D major
- Catalogue: RV 807
- Scoring: five soloists; SSATT choirs↑; orchestra

The Vivaldi setting catalogued as RV 807 was identified as his work only in 2005, having been thought to have been written by Baldassare Galuppi. A handwritten copy held by the Saxon State and University Library Dresden (Sächsische Staatsbibliothek) in Dresden is titled "Dixit a 4: con strumenti / del Sig: Baldasar Galuppi, detto Buranello / Fatto per l'Ospedale delli Mendicanti / 1745". Set in D major, it is scored for two sopranos, alto and two tenor soloists, choir and an orchestra of two bassoons, trumpet, strings and continuo. A reviewer of its first recording described it as a masterpiece with "bold, intensely coloured rhetoric".

== Editions ==
- Vivaldi: Dixit Dominus, RV 594, Carus-Verlag 2005
