= Intercession of the Spirit =

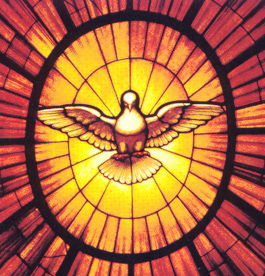
Stained glass representation of the Holy Spirit as a dove, c. 1660.

The Intercession of the Spirit is the Christian belief that the Holy Spirit helps and guides believers who search for God in their hearts.

In the Epistle to the Romans (8:26-27) Saint Paul states:

In the same way, the Spirit helps us in our weakness. We do not know what we ought to pray for, but the Spirit himself intercedes for us through wordless groans. And he who searches our hearts knows the mind of the Spirit, because the Spirit intercedes for God's people in accordance with the will of God.

There have been different theological interpretations of the intercession of the Spirit. John Calvin taught that it refers to the "teaching ministry of the Spirit" which instructs believers what to pray for and what to ask for in their prayers. On the other hand, Abraham Kuyper viewed the activity of the Spirit as separate and distinct from the efforts of the believers who pray. There are several books written by different authors on the topic of the guidance and intercession of the Holy Spirit.

== See also ==
- Intercession of Christ
- Intercession of saints
