= Intercession of Christ =

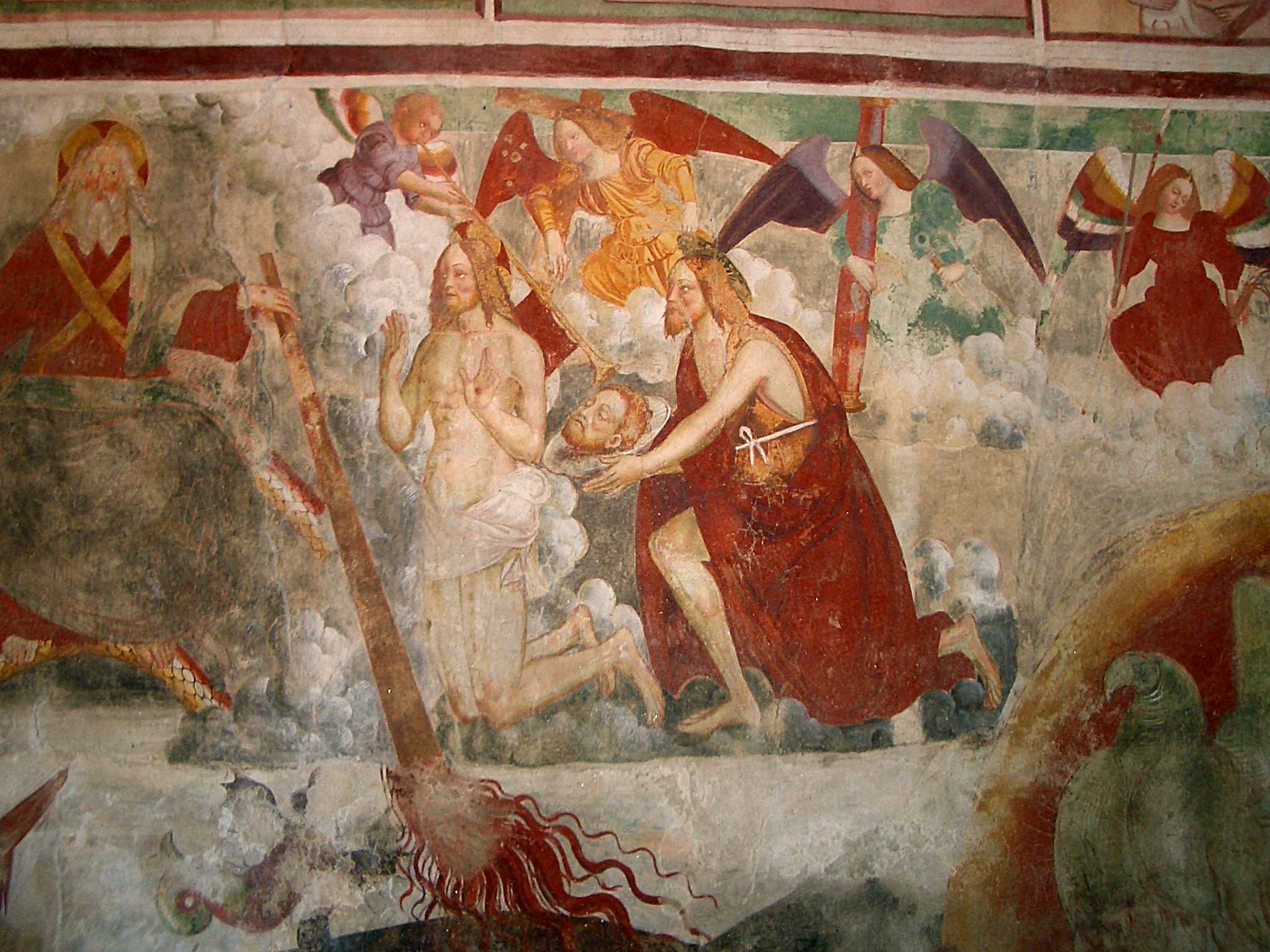
Jesus (and John the Baptist) kneeling before God the Father during the Last Judgement. Fresco at Paruzzaro, Italy, c. 1518

Intercession of Christ is the Christian belief in the continued intercession of Jesus and his advocacy on behalf of humanity, even after he left the earth.

In Christian teachings, the intercession of Christ before God relates to Jesus' anamnesis before God during the Last Supper and the continuing memorial nature of the Eucharistic offering.

From the Christological perspective, the intercession of Christ is distinguished from the Intercession of the Spirit. In the first case Christ takes petitions to the Father in Heaven, in the second case the Comforter (the Spirit) flows from Heaven toward the hearts of believers.

== Biblical basis ==
The theological basis for the belief in the intercession of Christ is provided in the New Testament. In the Epistle to the Romans (Romans 8:34) Saint Paul states:

It is Christ Jesus that died, yea rather, that was raised from the dead, who is at the right hand of God, who also maketh intercession for us.

This intercession resonates with John 17:22, which refers to the "heavenly communion" between Christ and God the Father. The First Epistle of John (John 2:1-2) states:

And if any man sin, we have an Advocate with the Father, Jesus Christ the righteous: and he is the propitiation for our sins; and not for ours only, but also for the whole world.

In the Epistle to the Hebrews (Hebrews 7:25) the author wrote of the "salvation to the uttermost" through the continued intercession of Christ:

Wherefore also he is able to save to the uttermost them that draw near unto God through him, seeing he ever liveth to make intercession for them.

The intercession of Christ in Heaven is seen as a continuation of the prayers and petitions he performed for humanity while on Earth, e.g. as in Luke 23:34: "Father, forgive them; for they know not what they do".

== Christology ==
In Pauline Christology the intercession of Christ has two components, both in the present and at the Last Judgement. This is expressed in Romans 8:33-34 in terms of "Who shall lay anything to the charge of God's elect?" and "Who is he that condemneth?", and then in Hebrews 7:25 in terms of the activities of Christ as the High Priest.

In Christian teachings, the intercession of Christ before God relates to Jesus' anamnesis before God during the Last Supper and the continuing memorial nature of the Eucharistic offering. In the Christology of salvation, the one time offering of Christ via his willing sacrifice at Calvary is distinguished from, but relates to his continued intercession from Heaven in his role as the High Priest, and his role at the Last Judgement. The notion of intercession by Christ as the Lamb of God relates to the imagery of the Lamb in Revelation 14:1:5 where those who are first saved "were purchased from among men" through the sacrifice of the lamb:

These are they that follow the Lamb whithersoever he goeth. These were purchased from among men, [to be] the firstfruits unto God and unto the Lamb.

From the Christological perspective, the intercession of Christ is distinguished from the Intercession of the Spirit. While 1 John 2:1 states "We have an Advocate with the Father, Jesus Christ the righteous", John 14:16-17 includes the statement:

And I will pray the Father, and he shall give you another Comforter, that he may be with you for ever, even the Spirit of truth: whom the world cannot receive; for it beholdeth him not, neither knoweth him: ye know him; for he abideth with you, and shall be in you.

The distinction between the two forms of the advocacy can be interpreted in terms of the direction of the flow: in the first case Christ takes petitions to the Father in Heaven, in the second case the comforter (the Spirit) flows from Heaven toward the hearts of believers.

== See also ==
- Intercession of the Spirit
- Intercession of saints
- Session of Christ
