= Gender of the Holy Spirit =

In Christian theology, the gender of the Holy Spirit has been the subject of some debate in recent times.

The grammatical gender of the word for "spirit" is feminine in Hebrew (רוּחַ, rūaḥ), neuter in Greek (πνεῦμα, pneûma) and masculine in Latin (spiritus). The neutral Greek πνεῦμα is used in the Septuagint to translate the Hebrew רוּחַ.

The Holy Spirit also was equated with the (grammatically feminine) Wisdom of God by two early Church fathers, Theophilus of Antioch (d. 180) and by Irenaeus (d. 202/3). However, the majority of theologians have, historically, identified Wisdom with Christ the Logos.

Gregory of Nazianzus in the fourth century wrote that terms like "Father" and "Son" in reference to the persons of the Trinity are not to be understood as expressing essences or energies of God but are to be understood as metaphors. The same position is held in the 1992 Catechism of the Catholic Church.

== Grammatical gender ==
Even in the same language, a difference may arise relating to what word is chosen to describe the Holy Spirit. In Greek, the word pneuma is grammatically neuter and so, in that language, the pronoun referring to the Holy Spirit under that name is also grammatically neuter. However, when the Holy Spirit is referred to by the grammatically masculine word Parakletos "counselor", the pronoun is masculine (since the pronoun refers to Parakletos rather than pneuma), as in John 16:7-8.

William D. Mounce argues that in the Gospel of John, when Jesus referred to the Holy Spirit as Comforter (masculine in Greek), the grammatically necessary masculine form of the Greek pronoun autos is used, but when Jesus speaks of the Holy Spirit as Spirit, grammatically neuter in Greek, the masculine form of the demonstrative pronoun ekeinos ("that masculine one") is used. This breaking of the grammatical agreement expected by native language readers is an indication of the author's intention to convey the personhood of the Holy Spirit. Daniel B. Wallace, however, disputes the claim that ekeinos is connected with pneuma in John 14:26 and 16:13-14, asserting instead that it belongs to parakletos. Wallace concludes that "it is difficult to find any text in which πνευμα is grammatically referred to with the masculine gender".

In Hebrew the word for Spirit (רוח) (ruach) is feminine, (which is used in the Hebrew Bible, as is the feminine word "shekhinah" in rabbinic literature, to indicate the presence of God, Arabic: سكينة sakina, a word mentioned six times in the Quran).

In the Syriac language, the grammatically feminine word rucha means "spirit", and writers in that language, both orthodox and Gnostic, used maternal images when speaking of the Holy Spirit. This imagery is found in the fourth-century theologians Aphrahat and Ephrem the Syrian. It is found in earlier writings of Syriac Christianity such as the Odes of Solomon and in the Gnostic early-third-century Acts of Thomas.

Historian of religion Susan Ashbrook Harvey considers the grammatical gender to have been significant for early Syriac Christianity: "It seems clear that for the Syrians, the cue from grammar—ruah as a feminine noun—was not entirely gratuitous. There was real meaning in calling the Spirit 'She'."

In the Catholic Church, the Holy Spirit is referred to in English as "He" in liturgical texts; however, the Holy See directs that "the established gender usage of each respective language [is] to be maintained."

== Discussion in mainstream Christianity ==
=== Ancient church ===
For Semitic languages, such as ancient Syriac, the earliest liturgical tradition and established gender usage for referring to the Holy Spirit is feminine.

The Syriac language, which was in common use around AD 300, is derived from Aramaic. In documents produced in Syriac by the early Miaphysite church (which later became the Syriac Orthodox Church) the feminine gender of the word for spirit gave rise to a theology in which the Holy Spirit was considered feminine.

=== Recent discussions ===
Some recent authors (1980s to present), while retaining masculine reference to Father and Son, have used feminine language for the Holy Spirit. These authors include Clark H. Pinnock, Thomas N. Finger, Jürgen Moltmann, Yves M.J. Congar, John J. O'Donnell, Donald L. Gelpi, and R.P. Nettlehorst.

Discovering Biblical Equality maintains that viewing God in masculine terms is merely a way in which we speak of God in figurative language. The author reiterates that God is spirit and that the Bible presents God through personification and anthropomorphism which reflects only a likeness to God.

There are some churches (see below) who teach that the Holy Spirit is feminine based on the fact that both feminine nouns and verbs, as well as feminine analogies, are thought to be used by the Bible to describe the Spirit of God in passages such as Genesis 1:1-2, Genesis 2:7, Deut. 32:11-12, Proverbs 1:20, Matthew 11:19, Luke 3:22, and John 3:5-6. These are based on the grammatical gender of both the nouns and verbs used by the original authors for the Spirit, as well as maternal analogies used by the prophets and Jesus for the Spirit in the original Bible languages.

There are biblical translations where the pronoun used for the Holy Spirit is masculine, in contrast to the gender of the noun used for spirit in Hebrew and Aramaic. In Aramaic also, the language generally considered to have been spoken by Jesus, the word is feminine. However, in Greek the word (pneuma) is neuter. Most English translations of the New Testament refer to the Holy Spirit as masculine in a number of places where the masculine Greek word "Paraclete" occurs, for "Comforter", most clearly in the Gospel of John, chapters 14 to 16. These texts were particularly significant when Christians were debating whether the New Testament teaches that the Holy Spirit is a fully divine hypostasis, as opposed to a created force.

== Feminine gender in other faith traditions ==
=== Latter-day Saints ===
In the Church of Jesus Christ of Latter-day Saints gender is seen "as an essential characteristic of eternal identity and purpose". The LDS Church believes that before humans lived on earth, they existed spiritually, with a spirit body with defined gender, and that the Holy Spirit had a similar body, but was to become a member of the three personage Godhead (Godhead consisting of God, or Heavenly Father, Jesus Christ, and the Holy Ghost).

=== Branch Davidians ===
Some small Christian groups regard the gender of the Holy Spirit to be female, based on their understanding that the Hebrew word for Spirit, ruach, can be feminine or masculine. Their views derive from skepticism toward Greek primacy for the New Testament. Foremost among these groups, and the most vocal on the subject are the Branch Davidian Seventh-day Adventists.

In 1977, one of their leaders, Lois Roden, began to formally teach that a feminine Holy Spirit is the heavenly pattern of women. In her many studies and talks she cited numerous scholars and researchers from Jewish, Christian, and other sources. They see in the creation of Adam and Eve a literal image and likeness of the invisible Godhead, male and female, who is "clearly seen, being understood by the things that are made".

They take the Oneness of God to mean the "familial" unity which exists between them, which unity is not seen in any other depiction of the Godhead by the various non-Hebrew peoples. Thus, having a Father and Mother in heaven, they see that the Bible shows that those Parents had a Son born unto them before the creation of the world, by Whom all things were created.

=== Unity Church ===
The Unity Church's co-founder Charles Fillmore considered the Holy Spirit a distinctly feminine aspect of God considering it to be "the love of Jehovah" and "love is always feminine".

=== Messianic Jews ===
The B'nai Yashua Synagogues Worldwide, a Messianic group headed by Rabbi Moshe Koniuchowsky, holds to the feminine view of the Holy Spirit. Messianic Judaism is considered by most Christians and Jews to be a form of Christianity.

There are also some other independent Messianic groups with similar teachings. Some examples include Joy In the World; The Torah and Testimony Revealed; Messianic Judaism - The Torah and the Testimony Revealed; and the Union of Nazarene Jewish Congregations/Synagogues, who also count as canonical the Gospel of the Hebrews which has the unique feature of referring to the Holy Spirit as Jesus' Mother.

Some scholars associated with mainline denominations, while not necessarily indicative of the denominations themselves, have written works explaining a feminine understanding of the third member of the Godhead.

=== Moravian Brethren ===
There was a well established place in liturgy, prayer and doctrine for the Holy Spirit as the Mother amongst the Moravian Brethren, exemplified by Count Zinzendorf especially.

=== Gnosticism ===
In the Secret Book of John, an ancient codex from the Nag Hammadi Library used in Christian Gnosticism, the divine female principle Barbelo is referred to as the Holy Spirit.

The Gnostic Gospel of Philip contains the following, "Some said, "Mary conceived by the Holy Spirit." They are in error. They do not know what they are saying. When did a woman ever conceive by a woman?"

The Gospel of The Hebrews also refers to The Holy Spirit as feminine.

== In art ==
In Christian iconography, the Holy Spirit is most often represented as a dove. There is also a far less common tradition of depicting the Holy Spirit in human form, usually as male. Thus, Andrei Rublev's The Trinity represents the Trinity as the "three men" who visited Abraham at the oak of Mamre often considered a theophany of the Trinity. In at least one medieval fresco, however, in the St. Jakobus church in Urschalling, Germany, the Holy Spirit is depicted as a female.

== See also ==
- Maid of Heaven, representation of the Holy Spirit in the Bahá'í Faith
