= Episcopal intercession =

Episcopal Intercession is the act of a church official interceding on behalf of a criminal.

The right to do so was granted by the secular power to the bishops of the Early Church and originated from respect for the church in the early centuries of Christianity, rather than by law or decree. Reference to its existence is made in the seventh canon of the Council of Sardica. It is also mentioned by St. Augustine, St. Jerome, and by Socrates in his "Church History". St. Augustine repeatedly interceded for criminals with Macedonius, then governor of Africa. Martin of Tours interceded with Emperor Maximus for the imprisoned Priscillianists in 384–5.

Bishop Flavian of Antioch interceded with Emperor Theodosius I in 387 on behalf of the inhabitants of Antioch, who had wantonly destroyed the imperial statues in that city. St. Ambrose induced Theodosius to enact a law which forbade the execution of the death penalty and the confiscation of property until thirty days after sentence had been passed. It was the purpose of this law to leave room for clemency and to prevent the punishing of the innocent.

To enable them to exercise their right of intercession, the bishops had free access to the prisons. They were exhorted to visit prisoners every Wednesday and Saturday in order to investigate the cause of their imprisonment, and to admonish the supervisors of the prisons to treat those committed to their charge with Christian charity. In case the prison-keepers were found to be inhumane or remiss in their duty to their prisoners, the bishops were to report these abuses to the emperor. The rights of the bishops were almost unlimited in this respect. They were somewhat regulated for the bishops of the Eastern Empire; for the bishops of the Western Empire.

The right of episcopal intercession was closely allied with the right of asylum or sanctuary. and the right and duty of the bishops to protect orphans, widows, and other unfortunates. Theodoret, Bishop of Cyrus, interceded with Empress Pulcheria in behalf of the poor of his diocese, who were overburdened with taxes. The Third Council of Carthage, held in 399, requested the emperor to accede to the wishes of the bishops by appointing advocates to plead the causes of the poor before the courts. The Council of Mâcon, held in 585, forbade all civil authorities to begin judicial proceedings against widows and orphans without previously notifying the bishop of the diocese to which the accused belonged.
