= David's Song =

David's Song may refer to

- King David's song of thanksgiving in the Hebrew Bible:
  - in 2 Samuel 22, beginning "The Lord is my rock, and my fortress, and my deliverer"
  - Psalm 18, beginning "I love you, O LORD, my strength" and continuing as in 2 Samuel 22
- "David's Song", from The Heavy Entertainment Show, 2010 album by Robbie Williams
- "David's Song (Who'll Come With Me)", 1978 song originally performed by The Kelly Family

== See also ==
- "A Song to David", a 1763 poem by Christopher Smart
