= Psalm 102 =

Biblical psalm

- "Hear my prayer, O LORD"
- Penitentiary psalm
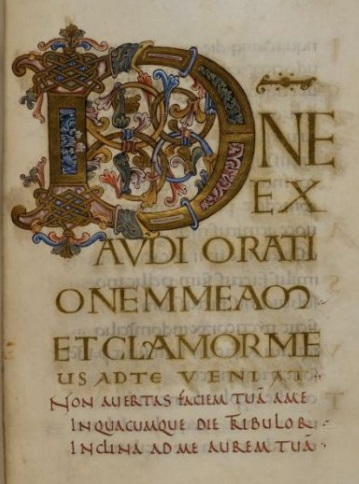
- Beginning of the psalm in the Ramsey Psalter, with illuminated initial
- Other name: Psalm 101; "Domine exaudi orationem meam"
- Language: Hebrew (original)

Psalm 102
- ← Psalm 101 Psalm 103 →
- Book: Book of Psalms
- Hebrew Bible part: Ketuvim
- Order in the Hebrew part: 1
- Category: Sifrei Emet
- Christian Bible part: Old Testament
- Order in the Christian part: 19

Psalm 102 is the 102nd psalm of the Book of Psalms, beginning in English in the King James Version: "Hear my prayer, O LORD, and let my cry come unto thee." In Latin, it is known as "Domine exaudi orationem meam".

In the slightly different numbering system used by the Greek Septuagint version of the bible and the Latin Vulgate, this psalm is Psalm 101.

This psalm is part of the fourth of the five biblical books of Psalms and is one of the seven penitential psalms. It begins the final section of the three traditional divisions of the Latin psalms, and for this reason the first words ("Domine exaudi orationem meam et clamor meus ad te veniat...") and above all the initial "D" are often greatly enlarged in illuminated manuscript psalters, following the pattern of the Beatus initials at the start of Psalm 1.

== Background and themes ==
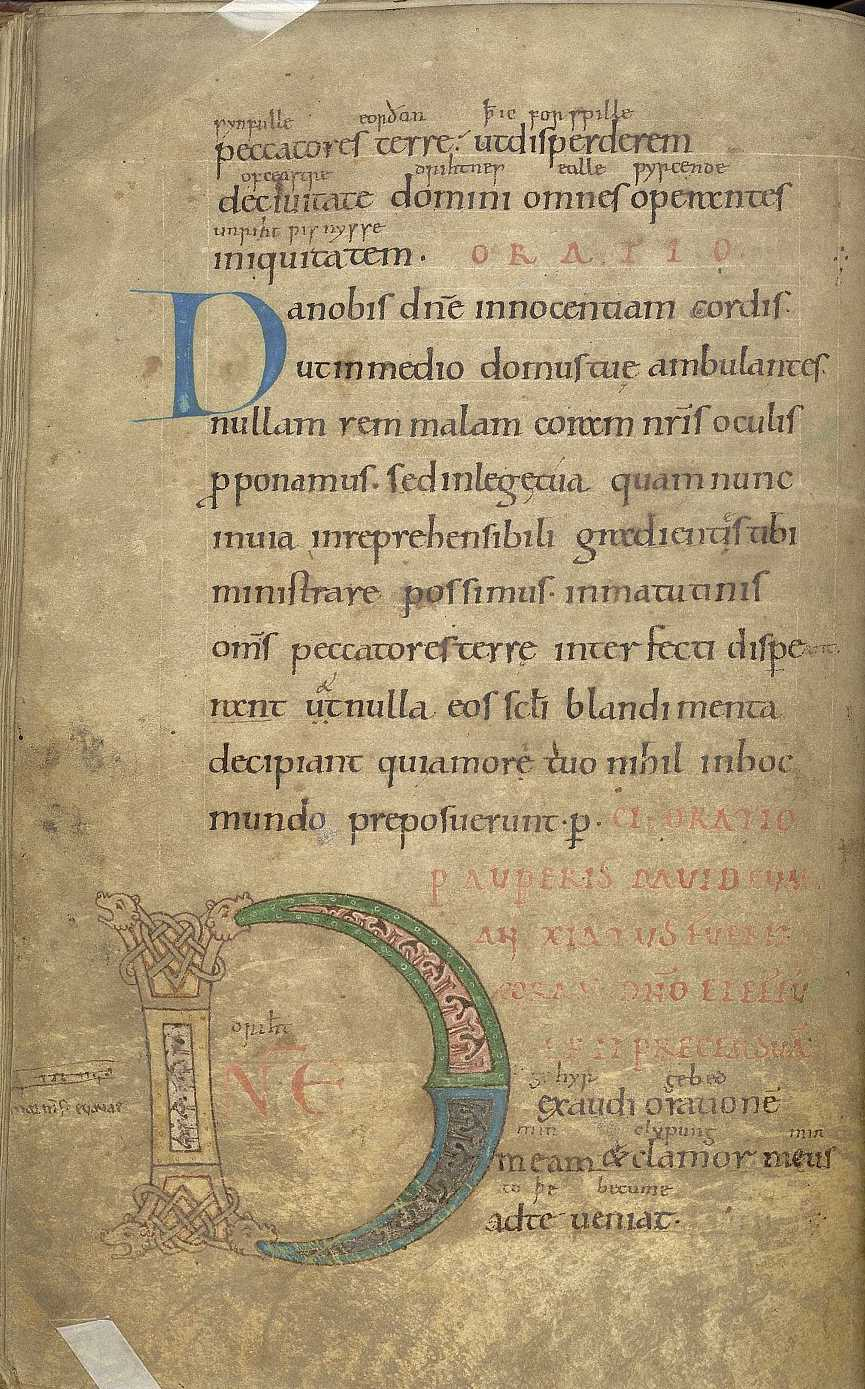
Stowe Psalter, f.2

Midrash Tehillim quotes Rabbi Pinchas, who notes that in some psalms David calls himself by name, as in "A prayer of David" (e.g. Psalm 17 and 86), but here he calls himself "the afflicted", as in "A prayer of the afflicted". Rabbi Pinchas explains that when David foresaw the righteous men who would descend from him—Asa, Jehoshaphat, Hezekiah, Isaiah—he called himself David. But when he perceived the wicked men who would be his descendants—Ahaz, Manasseh, Amon—he called himself "the afflicted".

In a greater context in the flow of Psalms, there are seven calls to praise with Psalms 95 though 100 immediately leading up to Psalm 102 and the writer commits to do that in Psalm 101. To the reader, Psalm 102 may feel an unexpected or out of place lament. By title 'A Prayer of one afflicted, when he is faint and pours out his complaint before the Lord." In this case in the flow weeping is set before praising. What follows in the flow of Psalms is addressing self with truth as a basis of praise. "Bless the Lord Oh my soul' in Psalms 103 and 104.

=== Textual witnesses ===
Some early manuscripts containing the text of this chapter in Hebrew are of the Masoretic Text tradition, which includes the Aleppo Codex (10th century), and Codex Leningradensis (1008).

The extant palimpsest Aq^{Taylor} includes a translation into Koine Greek by Aquila of Sinope in c. 130 CE, containing verses 16–29.

== Text ==
In the original Hebrew, the first verse introduces the psalm as "a prayer of the poor man" or "a prayer of the afflicted". The New King James Version has a longer sub-title, "A Prayer of the afflicted, when he is overwhelmed and pours out his complaint before the Lord."

The following table shows the Hebrew text of the Psalm with vowels, alongside the Koine Greek text in the Septuagint and the English translation from the King James Version. Note that the meaning can slightly differ between these versions, as the Septuagint and the Masoretic Text come from different textual traditions. (Note: A 1917 translation directly from Hebrew to English by the Jewish Publication Society can be found here or here, and an 1844 translation directly from the Septuagint by L. C. L. Brenton can be found here. Both translations are in the public domain.) In the Septuagint, this psalm is numbered Psalm 101.

#	Hebrew	English	Greek
(Note: In the Jewish verse numbering, the ascription of this psalm is verse 1, and the rest of the psalm begins from verse 2. However, the Christian verse numbering does not count the ascription.)	תְּ֭פִלָּה לְעָנִ֣י כִֽי־יַעֲטֹ֑ף וְלִפְנֵ֥י יְ֝הֹוָ֗ה יִשְׁפֹּ֥ךְ שִׂיחֽוֹ׃	(A Prayer of the afflicted, when he is overwhelmed, and poureth out his complaint before the LORD.)	Προσευχὴ τῷ πτωχῷ, ὅταν ἀκηδιάσῃ καὶ ἐναντίον Κυρίου ἐκχέῃ τὴν δέησιν αὐτοῦ. -
1	יְ֭הֹוָה שִׁמְעָ֣ה תְפִלָּתִ֑י וְ֝שַׁוְעָתִ֗י אֵלֶ֥יךָ תָבֽוֹא׃	Hear my prayer, O LORD, and let my cry come unto thee.	ΚΥΡΙΕ, εἰσάκουσον τῆς προσευχῆς μου, καὶ ἡ κραυγή μου πρὸς σὲ ἐλθέτω.
2	אַל־תַּסְתֵּ֬ר פָּנֶ֨יךָ ׀ מִמֶּנִּי֮ בְּי֢וֹם צַ֫ר־לִ֥י הַטֵּֽה־אֵלַ֥י אׇזְנֶ֑ךָ בְּי֥וֹם אֶ֝קְרָ֗א מַהֵ֥ר עֲנֵֽנִי׃	Hide not thy face from me in the day when I am in trouble; incline thine ear unto me: in the day when I call answer me speedily.	μὴ ἀποστρέψῃς τὸ πρόσωπόν σου ἀπ᾿ ἐμοῦ· ἐν ᾗ ἂν ἡμέρᾳ θλίβωμαι, κλῖνον πρός με τὸ οὖς σου· ἐν ᾗ ἂν ἡμέρᾳ ἐπικαλέσωμαί σε, ταχὺ ἐπάκουσόν μου,
3	כִּֽי־כָל֣וּ בְעָשָׁ֣ן יָמָ֑י וְ֝עַצְמוֹתַ֗י כְּמוֹקֵ֥ד נִחָֽרוּ׃	For my days are consumed like smoke, and my bones are burned as an hearth.	ὅτι ἐξέλιπον ὡσεὶ καπνὸς αἱ ἡμέραι μου, καὶ τὰ ὀστᾶ μου ὡσεὶ φρύγιον συνεφρύγησαν.
4	הוּכָּה־כָעֵ֣שֶׂב וַיִּבַ֣שׁ לִבִּ֑י כִּֽי־שָׁ֝כַ֗חְתִּי מֵאֲכֹ֥ל לַחְמִֽי׃	My heart is smitten, and withered like grass; so that I forget to eat my bread.	ἐπλήγην ὡσεὶ χόρτος καὶ ἐξηράνθη ἡ καρδία μου, ὅτι ἐπελαθόμην τοῦ φαγεῖν τὸν ἄρτον μου.
5	מִקּ֥וֹל אַנְחָתִ֑י דָּבְקָ֥ה עַ֝צְמִ֗י לִבְשָׂרִֽי׃	By reason of the voice of my groaning my bones cleave to my skin.	ἀπὸ φωνῆς τοῦ στεναγμοῦ μου ἐκολλήθη τὸ ὀστοῦν μου τῇ σαρκί μου.
6	דָּ֭מִיתִי לִקְאַ֣ת מִדְבָּ֑ר הָ֝יִ֗יתִי כְּכ֣וֹס חֳרָבֽוֹת׃	I am like a pelican of the wilderness: I am like an owl of the desert.	ὡμοιώθην πελεκᾶνι ἐρημικῷ, ἐγενήθην ὡσεὶ νυκτικόραξ ἐν οἰκοπέδῳ,
7	שָׁקַ֥דְתִּי וָאֶהְיֶ֑ה כְּ֝צִפּ֗וֹר בּוֹדֵ֥ד עַל־גָּֽג׃	I watch, and am as a sparrow alone upon the house top.	ἠγρύπνησα καὶ ἐγενόμην ὡς στρουθίον μονάζον ἐπὶ δώματος.
8	כׇּל־הַ֭יּוֹם חֵרְפ֣וּנִי אוֹיְבָ֑י מְ֝הוֹלָלַ֗י בִּ֣י נִשְׁבָּֽעוּ׃	Mine enemies reproach me all the day; and they that are mad against me are sworn against me.	ὅλην τὴν ἡμέραν ὠνείδιζόν με οἱ ἐχθροί μου, καὶ οἱ ἐπαινοῦντές με κατ᾿ ἐμοῦ ὤμνυον.
9	כִּי־אֵ֭פֶר כַּלֶּ֣חֶם אָכָ֑לְתִּי וְ֝שִׁקֻּוַ֗י בִּבְכִ֥י מָסָֽכְתִּי׃	For I have eaten ashes like bread, and mingled my drink with weeping.	ὅτι σποδὸν ὡσεὶ ἄρτον ἔφαγον καὶ τὸ πόμα μου μετὰ κλαυθμοῦ ἐκίρνων
10	מִפְּנֵֽי־זַעַמְךָ֥ וְקִצְפֶּ֑ךָ כִּ֥י נְ֝שָׂאתַ֗נִי וַתַּשְׁלִיכֵֽנִי׃	Because of thine indignation and thy wrath: for thou hast lifted me up, and cast me down.	ἀπὸ προσώπου τῆς ὀργῆς σου καὶ τοῦ θυμοῦ σου, ὅτι ἐπάρας κατέῤῥαξάς με.
11	יָ֭מַי כְּצֵ֣ל נָט֑וּי וַ֝אֲנִ֗י כָּעֵ֥שֶׂב אִיבָֽשׁ׃	My days are like a shadow that declineth; and I am withered like grass.	αἱ ἡμέραι μου ὡσεὶ σκιὰ ἐκλίθησαν, κἀγὼ ὡσεὶ χόρτος ἐξηράνθην.
12	וְאַתָּ֣ה יְ֭הֹוָה לְעוֹלָ֣ם תֵּשֵׁ֑ב וְ֝זִכְרְךָ֗ לְדֹ֣ר וָדֹֽר׃	But thou, O LORD, shalt endure for ever; and thy remembrance unto all generations.	σὺ δέ, Κύριε, εἰς τὸν αἰῶνα μένεις, καὶ τὸ μνημόσυνόν σου εἰς γενεὰν καὶ γενεάν.
13	אַתָּ֣ה תָ֭קוּם תְּרַחֵ֣ם צִיּ֑וֹן כִּי־עֵ֥ת לְ֝חֶֽנְנָ֗הּ כִּי־בָ֥א מוֹעֵֽד׃	Thou shalt arise, and have mercy upon Zion: for the time to favour her, yea, the set time, is come.	σὺ ἀναστὰς οἰκτειρήσεις τὴν Σιών, ὅτι καιρὸς τοῦ οἰκτειρῆσαι αὐτήν, ὅτι ἥκει καιρός·
14	כִּי־רָצ֣וּ עֲ֭בָדֶיךָ אֶת־אֲבָנֶ֑יהָ וְֽאֶת־עֲפָרָ֥הּ יְחֹנֵֽנוּ׃	For thy servants take pleasure in her stones, and favour the dust thereof.	ὅτι εὐδόκησαν οἱ δοῦλοί σου τοὺς λίθους αὐτῆς, καὶ τὸν χοῦν αὐτῆς οἰκτειρήσουσι.
15	וְיִֽירְא֣וּ ג֭וֹיִם אֶת־שֵׁ֣ם יְהֹוָ֑ה וְֽכׇל־מַלְכֵ֥י הָ֝אָ֗רֶץ אֶת־כְּבוֹדֶֽךָ׃	So the heathen shall fear the name of the LORD, and all the kings of the earth thy glory.	καὶ φοβηθήσονται τὰ ἔθνη τὸ ὄνομά σου, Κύριε, καὶ πάντες οἱ βασιλεῖς τῆς γῆς τὴν δόξαν σου,
16	כִּֽי־בָנָ֣ה יְהֹוָ֣ה צִיּ֑וֹן נִ֝רְאָ֗ה בִּכְבוֹדֽוֹ׃	When the LORD shall build up Zion, he shall appear in his glory.	ὅτι οἰκοδομήσει Κύριος τὴν Σιὼν καὶ ὀφθήσεται ἐν τῇ δόξῃ αὐτοῦ.
17	פָּ֭נָה אֶל־תְּפִלַּ֣ת הָעַרְעָ֑ר וְלֹא־בָ֝זָ֗ה אֶת־תְּפִלָּתָֽם׃	He will regard the prayer of the destitute, and not despise their prayer.	ἐπέβλεψεν ἐπὶ τὴν προσευχὴν τῶν ταπεινῶν καὶ οὐκ ἐξουδένωσε τὴν δέησιν αὐτῶν.
18	תִּכָּ֣תֶב זֹ֭את לְד֣וֹר אַחֲר֑וֹן וְעַ֥ם נִ֝בְרָ֗א יְהַלֶּל־יָֽהּ׃	This shall be written for the generation to come: and the people which shall be created shall praise the LORD.	γραφήτω αὕτη εἰς γενεὰν ἑτέραν, καὶ λαὸς ὁ κτιζόμενος αἰνέσει τὸν Κύριον.
19	כִּֽי־הִ֭שְׁקִיף מִמְּר֣וֹם קׇדְשׁ֑וֹ יְ֝הֹוָ֗ה מִשָּׁמַ֤יִם ׀ אֶל־אֶ֬רֶץ הִבִּֽיט׃	For he hath looked down from the height of his sanctuary; from heaven did the LORD behold the earth;	ὅτι ἐξέκυψεν ἐξ ὕψους ἁγίου αὐτοῦ, Κύριος ἐξ οὐρανοῦ ἐπὶ τὴν γῆν ἐπέβλεψε
20	לִ֭שְׁמֹעַ אֶנְקַ֣ת אָסִ֑יר לְ֝פַתֵּ֗חַ בְּנֵ֣י תְמוּתָֽה׃	To hear the groaning of the prisoner; to loose those that are appointed to death;	τοῦ ἀκοῦσαι τοῦ στεναγμοῦ τῶν πεπεδημένων, τοῦ λῦσαι τοὺς υἱοὺς τῶν τεθανατωμένων,
21	לְסַפֵּ֣ר בְּ֭צִיּוֹן שֵׁ֣ם יְהֹוָ֑ה וּ֝תְהִלָּת֗וֹ בִּירוּשָׁלָֽ͏ִם׃	To declare the name of the LORD in Zion, and his praise in Jerusalem;	τοῦ ἀναγγεῖλαι ἐν Σιὼν τὸ ὄνομα Κυρίου καὶ τὴν αἴνεσιν αὐτοῦ ἐν ῾Ιερουσαλὴμ
22	בְּהִקָּבֵ֣ץ עַמִּ֣ים יַחְדָּ֑ו וּ֝מַמְלָכ֗וֹת לַעֲבֹ֥ד אֶת־יְהֹוָֽה׃	When the people are gathered together, and the kingdoms, to serve the LORD.	ἐν τῷ συναχθῆναι λαοὺς ἐπὶ τὸ αὐτὸ καὶ βασιλεῖς τοῦ δουλεύειν τῷ Κυρίῳ.
23	עִנָּ֖ה בַדֶּ֥רֶךְ (כחו) [כֹּחִ֗י] קִצַּ֥ר יָמָֽי׃	He weakened my strength in the way; he shortened my days.	ἀπεκρίθη αὐτῷ ἐν ὁδῷ ἰσχύος αὐτοῦ· τὴν ὀλιγότητα τῶν ἡμερῶν μου ἀνάγγειλόν μοι·
24	אֹמַ֗ר אֵלִ֗י אַֽל־תַּ֭עֲלֵנִי בַּחֲצִ֣י יָמָ֑י בְּד֖וֹר דּוֹרִ֣ים שְׁנוֹתֶֽיךָ׃	I said, O my God, take me not away in the midst of my days: thy years are throughout all generations.	μὴ ἀναγάγῃς με ἐν ἡμίσει ἡμερῶν μου· ἐν γενεᾷ γενεῶν τὰ ἔτη σου.
25	לְ֭פָנִים הָאָ֣רֶץ יָסַ֑דְתָּ וּֽמַעֲשֵׂ֖ה יָדֶ֣יךָ שָׁמָֽיִם׃	Of old hast thou laid the foundation of the earth: and the heavens are the work of thy hands.	κατ᾿ ἀρχὰς σύ, Κύριε, τὴν γῆν ἐθεμελίωσας, καὶ ἔργα τῶν χειρῶν σού εἰσιν οἱ οὐρανοί·
26	הֵ֤מָּה ׀ יֹאבֵדוּ֮ וְאַתָּ֢ה תַ֫עֲמֹ֥ד וְ֭כֻלָּם כַּבֶּ֣גֶד יִבְל֑וּ כַּלְּב֖וּשׁ תַּחֲלִיפֵ֣ם וְֽיַחֲלֹֽפוּ׃	They shall perish, but thou shalt endure: yea, all of them shall wax old like a garment; as a vesture shalt thou change them, and they shall be changed:	αὐτοὶ ἀπολοῦνται, σὺ δὲ διαμένεις, καὶ πάντες ὡς ἱμάτιον παλαιωθήσονται, καὶ ὡσεὶ περιβόλαιον ἑλίξεις αὐτοὺς καὶ ἀλλαγήσονται·
27	וְאַתָּה־ה֑וּא וּ֝שְׁנוֹתֶ֗יךָ לֹ֣א יִתָּֽמּוּ׃	But thou art the same, and thy years shall have no end.	σὺ δὲ ὁ αὐτὸς εἶ, καὶ τὰ ἔτη σου οὐκ ἐκλείψουσιν.
28	בְּנֵֽי־עֲבָדֶ֥יךָ יִשְׁכּ֑וֹנוּ וְ֝זַרְעָ֗ם לְפָנֶ֥יךָ יִכּֽוֹן׃	The children of thy servants shall continue, and their seed shall be established before thee.	οἱ υἱοὶ τῶν δούλων σου κατασκηνώσουσι, καὶ τὸ σπέρμα αὐτῶν εἰς τὸν αἰῶνα κατευθυνθήσεται.

=== Verse 24 ===
I said, "O my God,
Do not take me away in the midst of my days;
Your years are throughout all generations."

There is a similar sentiment in Isaiah 38:10:

I said, "In the prime of my life, I shall go to the gates of Sheol; I am deprived of the remainder of my years".

== Uses ==
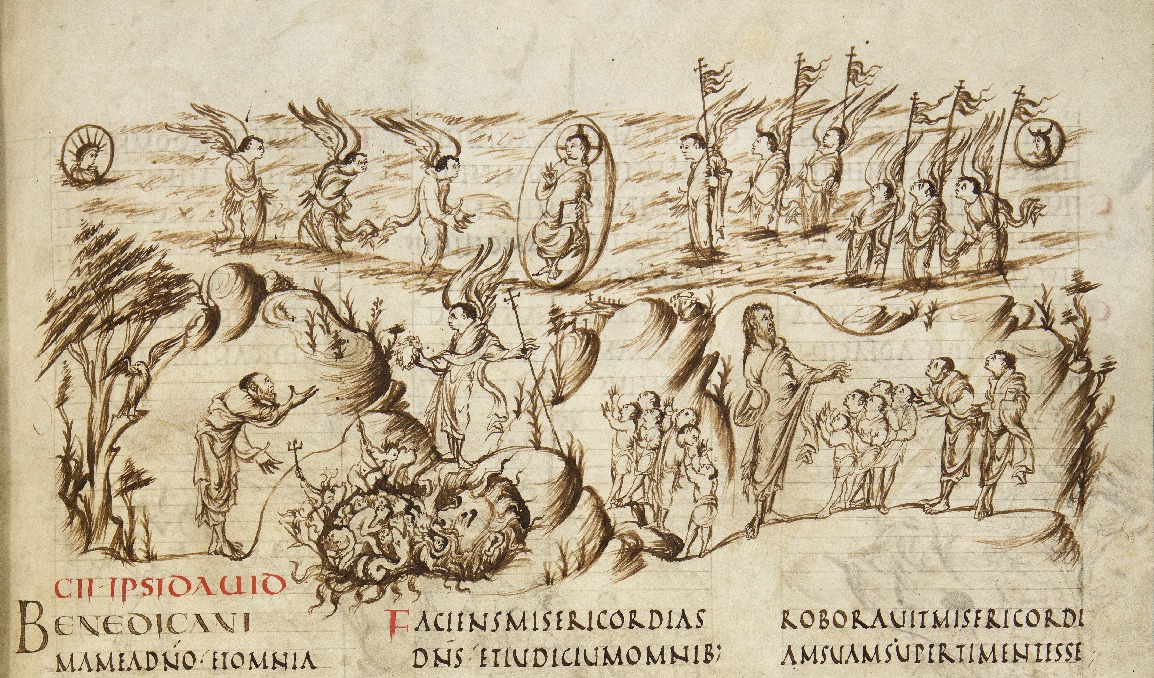
Start of Psalm 102, from the Utrecht Psalter, c. 800, Utrecht University Library

=== New Testament ===
In the New Testament, verses 25-27 are quoted in Hebrews 1:10–12 as an argument that Jesus is superior to the angels and making Psalm 102 in some sense both prayer to and praise concerning Jesus.

=== Judaism ===
Psalm 102 is one of 15 psalms recited as additional hymns during the Yom Kippur service by Sephardi Jews.

Verse 1 is recited by the sheaves of barley in Perek Shirah.

Verse 14 is said in Selichot. Sephardi Jews recite verse 14 after the prayer of Ein Keloheinu in the morning service. This verse is also used as a popular Jewish song called Atah takum, with the refrain ki va moed.

Psalm 102 is said in times of community crisis. It is also recited as a prayer for a childless woman to give birth. In the Siddur Sfas Emes, this psalm is said as a prayer "for the well-being of an ill person".

=== Catholic church ===
Verse 1, with some other psalm verses (such as 124:8), has a prominent place in Catholic and Anglican liturgies, where it is split as an antiphon into a "call" ("Lord, listen to my prayer", or "Hear my prayer, O Lord") and the response ("and let my cry come unto Thee").

This psalm occurs in the Monastic office of St Benedict (480-547) in the Saturday Vigil or Matins. It occurs in the same place in the Roman Breviary of St Pius V (1568) and occurs at Saturday Terce in the Roman Breviary of St Pius X (1911). In the revised office of Pope Paul VI (1971), the Psalm occurs on Tuesday in Week 4 of the Office of Readings.

=== Book of Common Prayer ===
In the Church of England's Book of Common Prayer, this psalm is appointed to be read on the morning of the twentieth day of the month, as well as at Evensong on Ash Wednesday.

=== Musical settings ===
Heinrich Schütz set Psalm 102 in a metred paraphrase in German, "Hör mein Gebet und laß zu dir", SWV 200, for the Becker Psalter, published first in 1628. The second verse is set in the first part of Hear my prayer, O Lord, an anthem composed in 1682 by Henry Purcell, using the translation of the Book of Common Prayer.

Verses 25b-28 (interspersed with Psalm 90) form the text of Jochen Klepper's 1938 Neujahrslied (New Years' Song).

In contemporary music, the Psalm was used in Semler's song titled "Psalm 102" from their 2021 EP "Late Bloomer".

As part of his five-volume "Revenant Psalms" project, seminary professor Timothy Slemmons paraphrased Psalm 102 in its entirety and arranged it for a guitar-based setting, entitled "Martyrs on the March".

== Sources ==
- Nulman, Macy (1996). The Encyclopedia of Jewish Prayer: The Ashkenazic and Sephardic Rites. Jason Aronson. ISBN 1461631246.
