= Hebrews 2 =

- ← chapter 1 chapter 3 →
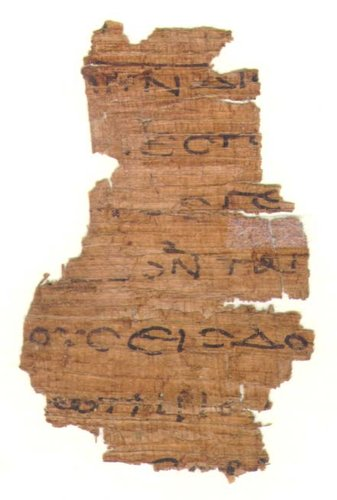
- Hebrews 2:9-11 in Papyrus 116 (6th century)
- Book: Epistle to the Hebrews
- Category: General epistles
- Christian Bible part: New Testament
- Order in the Christian part: 19

Hebrews 2 is the second chapter of the Epistle to the Hebrews in the New Testament of the Christian Bible. The author is anonymous, although the internal reference to "our brother Timothy" (Hebrews 13:23) causes a traditional attribution to Paul, but this attribution has been disputed since the second century and there is no decisive evidence for the authorship. This chapter contains the implications for responding to God's Son, the Son's subjection and glorification, to the believers' benefits.

== Text ==
The original text was written in Koine Greek. This chapter is divided into 18 verses.

=== Textual witnesses ===
Some early manuscripts containing the text of this chapter are:

- Papyrus 46 (175–225; complete)
- Papyrus 13 (225-250; extant verses 14–18)
- Codex Vaticanus (325-350)
- Codex Sinaiticus (330-360)
- Codex Alexandrinus (400-440)
- Codex Ephraemi Rescriptus (~450; extant verses 5-18)
- Codex Freerianus (~450; extant verses 4–7, 12–14)
- Codex Claromontanus (~550)
- Codex Coislinianus (~550; extant verses 11–16)
- Papyrus 116 (6th century; extant verses 9-11)

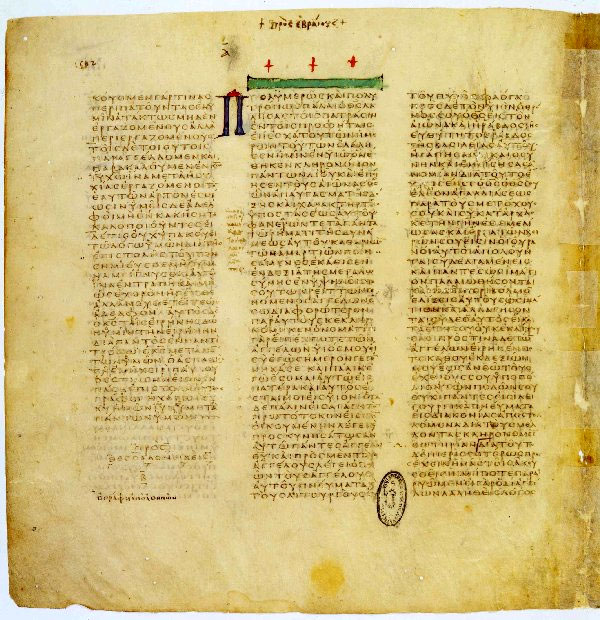
Pages containing 2 Thessalonians 3:11-18 and Hebrews 1:1-2:2 in Codex Vaticanus (AD. 325–350).

=== Old Testament references ===
- Hebrews 2:8: Psalm 8:4–6
- Hebrews 2:12: Psalm 22:22
- Hebrews 2:13a: 2 Samuel 22:3; Psalm 18:2; Isaiah 8:17–18
- Hebrews 2:13b: Isaiah 8:18

== The Implications for Responding to God's Son (2:1–4) ==
This paragraph, the first of several warning passages, gives the direct practical consequences of the previous chapter, which can be a positive encouragement (pay more careful attention to what we have heard) or a negative attitude (drift away) as stated in verse 1. The writer and readers were not part of the first generation of Christians when the gospel of salvation was first announced by the Lord (that is, Jesus Christ) and was confirmed by those who heard him (Hebrews 2:3), but they certainly received it from those who had obtained it from Jesus with the affirmation from God by signs, wonders and various miracles, and gifts of the Holy Spirit distributed according to His will (Hebrews 2:4).

=== Verse 1 ===
Therefore we must give the more earnest heed to the things we have heard, lest we drift away.

- "Drift away": like people in a boat moving rapidly towards a waterfall; the manner of this drifting away will be explored in latter chapters, but here the disastrous consequences are stressed.

== The Subjection and Glorification of the Son (2:5–9) ==
The text centers on Psalm 8:4–6 in connection to the catena or 'chains' of the scriptures in the first chapter.

=== Verse 5 ===
For He has not put the world to come, of which we speak, in subjection to angels.

- "The world to come": recalling Israel's hope for "a glorious age to come", with the renewal of creation through the establishment of 'new heavens and new earth' (cf. Isaiah 65:17–25) which is sometimes specifically associated with the work of the Messiah (cf. Isaiah 11:1–9).

=== Verse 6 ===
But someone testified somewhere, saying,
“What is man, that you remember him, or the son of man, that you care for him?

== The Benefits of the Believers (2:10–18) ==
=== Verse 12 ===
saying:

“I will declare Your name to My brethren; In the midst of the assembly I will sing praise to You."

- Citing Psalm 22:22

=== Verse 17 ===
Therefore, in all things He had to be made like His brethren, that He might be a merciful and faithful High Priest in things pertaining to God, to make propitiation for the sins of the people.

- "High Priest": the first time this title is given to Jesus in this epistle, to be the theme of the next major division (3:1–5:10), here is linked closely with the teaching that he had to be made like his brothers in every way.

=== Verse 18 ===
For in that He Himself has suffered, being tempted, He is able to aid those who are tempted.

- "He Himself has suffered, being tempted": at the entrance of his public ministry and a little before his death, Jesus was tempted by Satan; also throughout his life he endures poverty, with slight from his own relatives, a general contempt among men, often tempted by the Jews with ensnaring questions, later was deserted by his followers, by his own disciples, even by his God and Father; enduring great pains of body, anguish of mind, then lastly death itself.
- "To aid those who are tempted": that only because he shared human nature, experienced human frailty and suffered when he was tempted, so Jesus is able to provide the appropriate help.

== See also ==
- Angel
- High priest
- Jesus Christ
- Related Bible parts: Job 7, 2 Samuel 22, Psalm 8, Psalm 22, Psalm 144, Isaiah 8, Isaiah 11, Matthew 4, Luke 4, Luke 22, John 10, 1 Corinthians 10, 2 Corinthians 12, Philippians 3, 2 Timothy 1, Hebrews 4, Jude, Revelation 3

== Sources ==
- Attridge, Harold W. (2007). "75. Hebrews". In Barton, John; Muddiman, John (eds.). The Oxford Bible Commentary (first (paperback) ed.). Oxford University Press. pp. 1236–1254. ISBN 978-0199277186.
- deSilva, David A. (2005). "Hebrews". In Evans, Craig A. (ed.). Bible Knowledge Background Commentary: John's Gospel, Hebrews-Revelation. The Bible Knowledge Series (illustrated ed.). Colorado Springs, Colo.: Victor. pp. 199–256. ISBN 9780781442282.
- Peterson, David (1994). "Hebrews". In Carson, D. A.; France, R. T.; Motyer, J. A.; Wenham, G. J. (eds.). New Bible Commentary: 21st Century Edition (4, illustrated, reprint, revised ed.). Inter-Varsity Press. pp. 1321–1353. ISBN 9780851106489.
