= Psalm 101 =

Biblical psalm

- "I will sing of mercy and judgment"
- Other name: Psalm 100; "Misericordiam et iudicium cantabo"
- Language: Hebrew (original)

Psalm 101
- ← Psalm 100 Psalm 102 →
- Book: Book of Psalms
- Hebrew Bible part: Ketuvim
- Order in the Hebrew part: 1
- Category: Sifrei Emet
- Christian Bible part: Old Testament
- Order in the Christian part: 19

Psalm 101 is the 101st psalm of the Book of Psalms, beginning in English in the King James Version: "I will sing of mercy and judgment". The Book of Psalms is part of the third section of the Hebrew Bible, and a book of the Christian Old Testament. In the slightly different numbering system used in the Greek Septuagint and Latin Vulgate translations of the Bible, this psalm is Psalm 100. In Latin, it is known as "Misericordiam et iudicium cantabo". It is attributed to David, and provides warnings for the wicked, while explaining the benefits the righteous will reap.

The psalm forms a regular part of Jewish, Catholic, Lutheran, Anglican and other Protestant liturgies.

== Commentary ==
According to Matthew Henry, "David was certainly the penman of this psalm", and he here "cuts out to himself and others a pattern both of a good magistrate and a good master of a family; and, if these were careful to discharge the duty of their place, it would contribute very much to a universal reformation.

== Uses ==
=== Catholic Church ===
Since the Middle Ages, this psalm was traditionally performed at the office of matins the Friday, according to the Rule of St. Benedict established in 530.

In the Liturgy of the Hours, Psalm 101 is sung or recited at Lauds on Tuesday of the fourth week of the four weekly cycle of liturgical prayers.

=== Anglican Communion ===
In the Book of Common Prayer of the Church of England, and in liturgies derived from them, Psalm 101 is traditionally said or sung at Evensong on the 19th day of each month.

=== Coptic Orthodox Church ===
In the Agpeya, the Coptic Church's book of hours, this psalm is prayed in the office of None.

=== Musical settings ===
Heinrich Schütz set Psalm 101 in a metred paraphrase in German, "Von Gnad und Recht soll singen", SWV 199, for the Becker Psalter, published first in 1628.

== Text ==
The following table shows the Hebrew text of the Psalm with vowels, alongside the Koine Greek text in the Septuagint and the English translation from the King James Version. Note that the meaning can slightly differ between these versions, as the Septuagint and the Masoretic Text come from different textual traditions. (Note: A 1917 translation directly from Hebrew to English by the Jewish Publication Society can be found here or here, and an 1844 translation directly from the Septuagint by L. C. L. Brenton can be found here. Both translations are in the public domain.) In the Septuagint, this psalm is numbered Psalm 100.

#	Hebrew	English	Greek
1	לְדָוִ֗ד מִ֫זְמ֥וֹר חֶֽסֶד־וּמִשְׁפָּ֥ט אָשִׁ֑ירָה לְךָ֖ יְהֹוָ֣ה אֲזַמֵּֽרָה׃	(A Psalm of David.) I will sing of mercy and judgment: unto thee, O Lord, will I sing.	Ψαλμὸς τῷ Δαυΐδ. - ΕΛΕΟΣ καὶ κρίσιν ᾄσομαί σοι, Κύριε·
2	אַשְׂכִּ֤ילָה ׀ בְּדֶ֬רֶךְ תָּמִ֗ים מָ֭תַי תָּב֣וֹא אֵלָ֑י אֶתְהַלֵּ֥ךְ בְּתׇם־לְ֝בָבִ֗י בְּקֶ֣רֶב בֵּיתִֽי׃	I will behave myself wisely in a perfect way. O when wilt thou come unto me? I will walk within my house with a perfect heart.	ψαλῶ καὶ συνήσω ἐν ὁδῷ ἀμώμῳ· πότε ἥξεις πρός με; διεπορευόμην ἐν ἀκακίᾳ καρδίας μου ἐν μέσῳ τοῦ οἴκου μου.
3	לֹֽא־אָשִׁ֨ית ׀ לְנֶ֥גֶד עֵינַ֗י דְּֽבַר־בְּלִ֫יָּ֥עַל עֲשֹֽׂה־סֵטִ֥ים שָׂנֵ֑אתִי לֹ֖א יִדְבַּ֣ק בִּֽי׃	I will set no wicked thing before mine eyes: I hate the work of them that turn aside; it shall not cleave to me.	οὐ προεθέμην πρὸ ὀφθαλμῶν μου πρᾶγμα παράνομον, ποιοῦντας παραβάσεις ἐμίσησα· οὐκ ἐκολλήθη μοι καρδία σκαμβή.
4	לֵבָ֣ב עִ֭קֵּשׁ יָס֣וּר מִמֶּ֑נִּי רָ֝֗ע לֹ֣א אֵדָֽע׃	A froward heart shall depart from me: I will not know a wicked person.	ἐκκλίνοντος ἀπ᾿ ἐμοῦ τοῦ πονηροῦ οὐκ ἐγίνωσκον.
5	(מלושני) [מְלׇשְׁנִ֬י] בַסֵּ֨תֶר ׀ רֵעֵהוּ֮ אוֹת֢וֹ אַ֫צְמִ֥ית גְּֽבַהּ־עֵ֭ינַיִם וּרְחַ֣ב לֵבָ֑ב אֹ֝ת֗וֹ לֹ֣א אוּכָֽל׃	Whoso privily slandereth his neighbour, him will I cut off: him that hath an high look and a proud heart will not I suffer.	τὸν καταλαλοῦντα λάθρᾳ τὸν πλησίον αὐτοῦ, τοῦτον ἐξεδίωκον· ὑπερηφάνῳ ὀφθαλμῷ καὶ ἀπλήστῳ καρδίᾳ, τούτῳ οὐ συνήσθιον.
6	עֵינַ֤י ׀ בְּנֶֽאֶמְנֵי־אֶרֶץ֮ לָשֶׁ֢בֶת עִמָּ֫דִ֥י הֹ֭לֵךְ בְּדֶ֣רֶךְ תָּמִ֑ים ה֝֗וּא יְשָׁרְתֵֽנִי׃	Mine eyes shall be upon the faithful of the land, that they may dwell with me: he that walketh in a perfect way, he shall serve me.	οἱ ὀφθαλμοί μου ἐπὶ τοὺς πιστοὺς τῆς γῆς τοῦ συγκαθῆσθαι αὐτοὺς μετ᾿ ἐμοῦ· πορευόμενος ἐν ὁδῷ ἀμώμῳ, οὗτός μοι ἐλειτούργει.
7	לֹֽא־יֵשֵׁ֨ב ׀ בְּקֶ֥רֶב בֵּיתִי֮ עֹשֵׂ֢ה רְמִ֫יָּ֥ה דֹּבֵ֥ר שְׁקָרִ֑ים לֹֽא־יִ֝כּ֗וֹן לְנֶ֣גֶד עֵינָֽי׃	He that worketh deceit shall not dwell within my house: he that telleth lies shall not tarry in my sight.	οὐ κατῴκει ἐν μέσῳ τῆς οἰκίας μου ποιῶν ὑπερηφανίαν, λαλῶν ἄδικα οὐ κατεύθυνεν ἐνώπιον τῶν ὀφθαλμῶν μου.
8	לַבְּקָרִ֗ים אַצְמִ֥ית כׇּל־רִשְׁעֵי־אָ֑רֶץ לְהַכְרִ֥ית מֵעִיר־יְ֝הֹוָ֗ה כׇּל־פֹּ֥עֲלֵי אָֽוֶן׃	I will early destroy all the wicked of the land; that I may cut off all wicked doers from the city of the Lord.	εἰς τὰς πρωίας ἀπέκτεινον πάντας τοὺς ἁμαρτωλοὺς τῆς γῆς τοῦ ἐξολοθρεῦσαι ἐκ πόλεως Κυρίου πάντας τοὺς ἐργαζομένους τὴν ἀνομίαν.

=== Verses ===
- "I will sing of mercy and justice" (verse 1): God's "mercy" and "justice" go together, because when justice pronounces its righteous penalty, mercy may grant relief. As king, David knows that before he could exercise mercy and justice in His kingdom, he had to understand and extol the mercy and justice of God.
- "I will behave wisely in a perfect way" (verse 2): David determined that his reign would be marked by integrity and godliness, that is, to live a wise and holy life (perfect way), because as he came into a position of greater power, he experienced that power often exposes the flaws of character, if it does not actually help create them.
- "I will walk within my house with a perfect heart": David's righteous life had to be real in his conduct within his own house, before it could be applied in the courts of his kingdom.
- "I will set nothing wicked before my eyes" (verses 3–4): One measure of a righteous life was what one chose to set before the eyes, as the lust of the eyes is a significant aspect of the lure of this world (1 John 2:6).
- "Whoever secretly slanders his neighbor" (verse 5): To lie or speak in an evil way against another is a significant and grievous sin and the worst of it is done secretly, so David was determined to oppose all who did so ("Him I will destroy").
- "My eyes shall be on the faithful of the land" (verses 6–8): Instead of looking at those who thought themselves better than others, David preferred to look at the faithful, deciding that they would dwell with him.
- "Early I will destroy all the wicked of the land": David's determination to rule in favor of the godly, made him decide to remove the wicked early on from the city of God.
