= Hebrews 4 =

- ← chapter 3 chapter 5 →
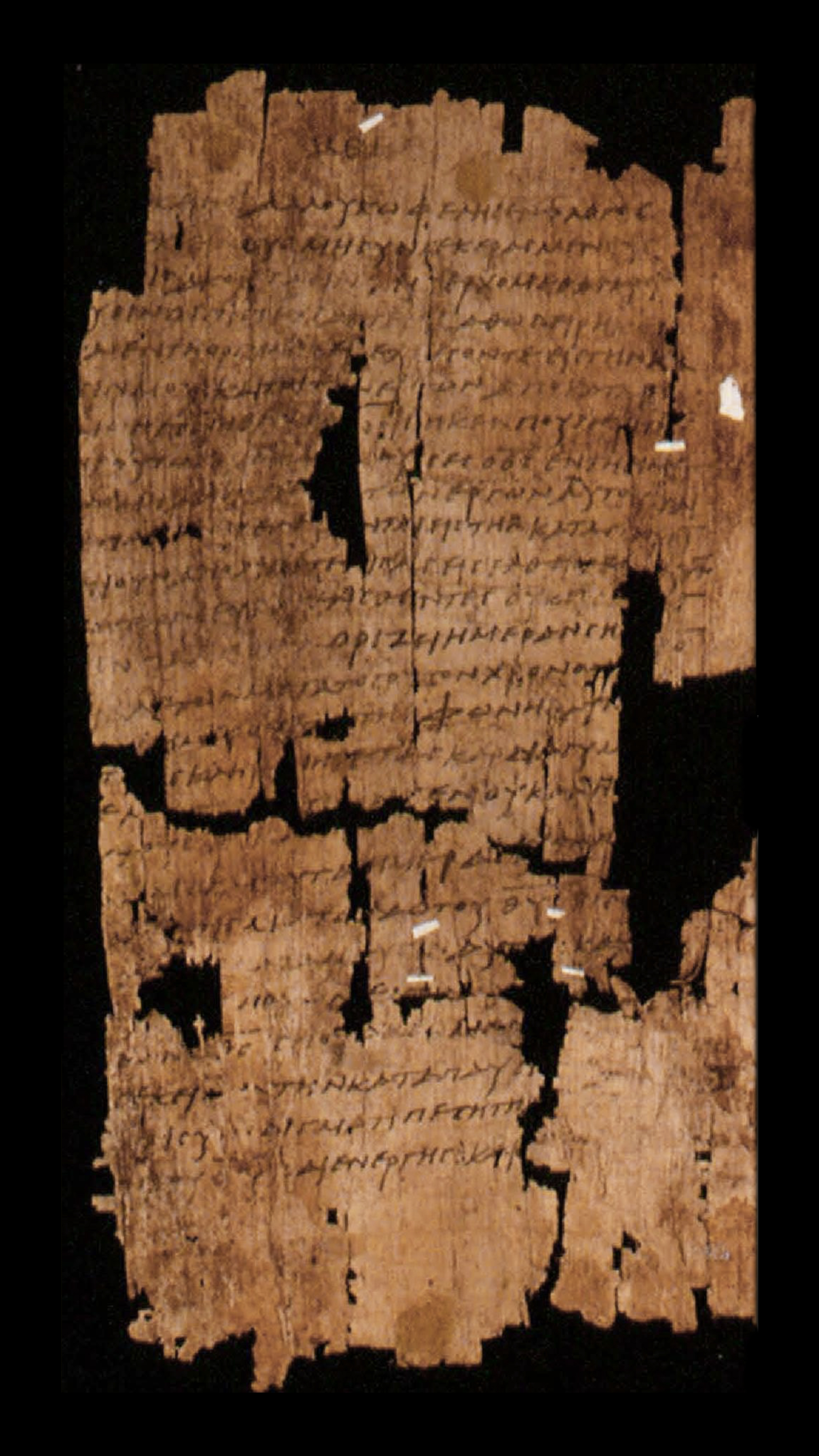
- Epistle to the Hebrews 4:2ff in two columns of Papyrus 13 (AD. 225-250).
- Book: Epistle to the Hebrews
- Category: General epistles
- Christian Bible part: New Testament
- Order in the Christian part: 19

Hebrews 4 is the fourth chapter of the Epistle to the Hebrews in the New Testament of the Christian Bible. The author is anonymous, although the internal reference to "our brother Timothy" (Hebrews 13:23) causes a traditional attribution to Paul, but this attribution has been disputed since the second century and there is no decisive evidence for the authorship. This chapter contains an admonition to press on toward 'God's Rest' and a reflection on the power of God's Word.

== Text ==
The original text was written in Koine Greek. This chapter is divided into 16 verses.

=== Textual witnesses ===
Some early manuscripts containing the text of this chapter are:

- Papyrus 46 (175–225; complete)
- Papyrus 13 (225-250; complete)
- Codex Vaticanus (325-350)
- Codex Sinaiticus (330-360)
- Codex Alexandrinus (400-440)
- Codex Ephraemi Rescriptus (~450; complete)
- Codex Freerianus (~450; extant verse 3–6, 12–14)
- Codex Claromontanus (~550)
- Codex Coislinianus (~550; extant verse 12–15)

=== Old Testament references ===
- Hebrews 4:1: Psalm 95:11
- Hebrews 4:3: Psalm 95:7–11
- Hebrews 4:4: Genesis 2:2
- Hebrews 4:5: Psalm 95:11
- Hebrews 4:7: Psalm 95:7, 8

== A call to faithfulness (3:7–4:13) ==
=== Verse 7 ===
again He designates a certain day, saying in David, "Today," after such a long time, as it has been said:

"Today, if you will hear His voice,
Do not harden your hearts."

The Hebrew version of Psalm 95 names no author, but David is explicitly said to have written these words from Psalm 95:7–8, which happened long after the Israelites already enjoyed rest and were established in Canaan under the leadership of Joshua. Therefore, this day ("Today") is another day in the future for God's people to enter a heavenly rest, beyond the enjoyment of life in the land of Israel.

=== Verse 8 ===
For if Joshua had given them rest, then He would not afterward have spoken of another day.

The "rest" experienced by the Israelites in the time of Joshua was 'an earthly anticipation of the ultimate, heavenly rest', an old covenant promise which is fulfilled in a transformed way by Jesus Christ.

=== Verses 11-13 ===
^{11} Let us try as hard as we can to enter God's rest so that no one will fail by following the example of those who refused to obey.

Verses 12-13 contain a warning demonstrating "the necessity for compliance with this exhortation":

^{12} For the word of God is living and powerful, and sharper than any two-edged sword, piercing even to the division of soul and spirit, and of joints and marrow, and is a discerner of the thoughts and intents of the heart.
^{13} Nothing in all creation is hidden from God. Everything is naked and exposed before his eyes, and he is the one to whom we are accountable.

Many Church Fathers and later theologians have identified "the word of God" with the Son of God. Protestant theologian Heinrich Meyer notes that in Hebrews 1:2 there is confirmation that "in these last days [God] has spoken to us by his Son", but argues that the present wording cannot be read in this way because when Hebrews was written, "the expression was too unusual for it to be employed and understood [in this way] without further indication". In his opinion it therefore must have a more broader meaning, quite generally: "that which God speaks".

== The compassion of Christ (4:14–5:10) ==
The characteristic term of this section is 'High Priest', which links to the beginning of the previous section (3:1; cf. 2:17) as an introduction to the new segment.

=== Verse 15 ===
For we do not have a High Priest who cannot sympathize with our weaknesses, but was in all points tempted as we are, yet without sin.

- "Tempted as we are" refers to the temptations of Christ mentioned in Hebrews 2:18.

== See also ==
- Angel
- High priest
- Jesus Christ
- Joshua
- Related Bible parts: Numbers 1, Psalm 95, Luke 4, Luke 22, John 10, 1 Corinthians 10, 2 Corinthians 12, Philippians 3, 2 Timothy 1, Hebrews 2, Revelation 3

== Sources ==
- Attridge, Harold W. (2007). "75. Hebrews". In Barton, John; Muddiman, John (eds.). The Oxford Bible Commentary (first (paperback) ed.). Oxford University Press. pp. 1236–1254. ISBN 978-0199277186.
- deSilva, David A. (2005). "Hebrews". In Evans, Craig A. (ed.). Bible Knowledge Background Commentary: John's Gospel, Hebrews-Revelation. The Bible Knowledge Series (illustrated ed.). Colorado Springs, Colo.: Victor. pp. 199–256. ISBN 9780781442282.
- Peterson, David (1994). "Hebrews". In Carson, D. A.; France, R. T.; Motyer, J. A.; Wenham, G. J. (eds.). New Bible Commentary: 21st Century Edition (4, illustrated, reprint, revised ed.). Inter-Varsity Press. pp. 1321–1353. ISBN 9780851106489.
