= Psalm 18 =

Biblical psalm

- "I love you, O LORD, my strength."
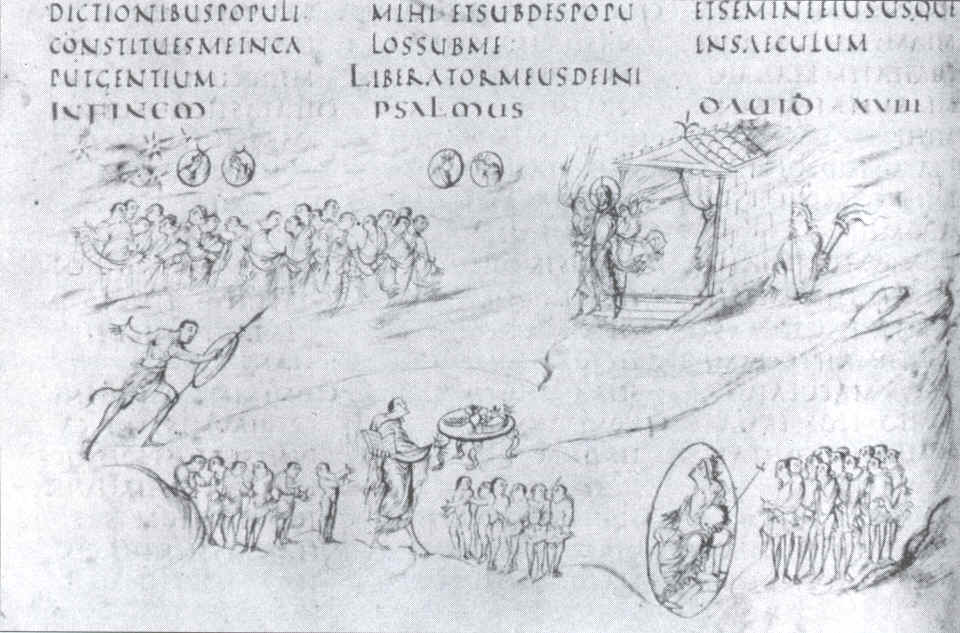
- End of Psalm 18, Utrecht Psalter, Carolingian manuscript, Rheims style, Utrecht Cathedral Library
- Other name: Psalm 17; Diligam te Domine fortitudo mea
- Language: Hebrew (original)

Psalm 18
- ← Psalm 17 Psalm 19 →
- Book: Book of Psalms
- Hebrew Bible part: Ketuvim
- Order in the Hebrew part: 1
- Category: Sifrei Emet
- Christian Bible part: Old Testament
- Order in the Christian part: 19

Psalm 18 is the 18th psalm of the Book of Psalms, beginning in English in the King James Version: "I love you, O LORD, my strength". In the slightly different numbering of the Greek Septuagint and the Latin Vulgate, this psalm is Psalm 17. In Latin, it is also known by its incipit as "Diligam te Domine fortitudo mea". It is almost identical to 2 Samuel 22, although verse 1 of the psalm, I love you, O LORD, my strength, is not included in the Samuel version. With 50 verses, this is the longest psalm in Book 1 of the Book of Psalms (Psalms 1-41).

The psalm forms a regular part of Jewish, Catholic, Lutheran, Anglican and other Protestant liturgies. It was set to music by composers such as Heinrich Schütz.

== Theme ==
The Jerusalem Bible describes this psalm as "a triumphal ode combining a thanksgiving prayer ... with a royal victory song, ending on a messianic note".

According to Charles and Emilie Briggs in the International Critical Commentary series, this psalm borrowed material from 2 Samuel 22, which may have been written by David himself, with later additions by multiple editors adapting it for use in public worship.

This psalm is one of a number of psalms which refer to God as a "rock" and a "fortress".

Details in the Psalm, including the language of a watery descent to Sheol, closely match details from the Book of Jonah.

== Text ==
The following table shows the Hebrew text of the Psalm with vowels, alongside the Koine Greek text in the Septuagint and the English translation from the King James Version. Note that the meaning can slightly differ between these versions, as the Septuagint and the Masoretic Text come from different textual traditions. (Note: A 1917 translation directly from Hebrew to English by the Jewish Publication Society can be found here or here, and an 1844 translation directly from the Septuagint by L. C. L. Brenton can be found here. Both translations are in the public domain.) In the Septuagint, this psalm is numbered Psalm 17.

#	Hebrew	English	Greek
(Note: In the Jewish verse numbering, the ascription of this psalm is verse 1, and the rest of the psalm begins from verse 2. However, the Christian verse numbering does not count the ascription as a separate verse.)	לַמְנַצֵּ֤חַ ׀ לְעֶ֥בֶד יְהֹוָ֗ה לְדָ֫וִ֥ד אֲשֶׁ֤ר דִּבֶּ֨ר ׀ לַיהֹוָ֗ה אֶת־דִּ֭בְרֵי הַשִּׁירָ֣ה הַזֹּ֑את בְּי֤וֹם הִֽצִּיל־יְהֹוָ֘ה אוֹת֥וֹ מִכַּ֥ף כׇּל־א אֹ֝יְבָ֗יו וּמִיַּ֥ד שָׁאֽוּל׃	(To the chief Musician, A Psalm of David, the servant of the LORD, who spake unto the LORD the words of this song in the day that the LORD delivered him from the hand of all his enemies, and from the hand of Saul: And he said,)	Εἰς τὸ τέλος· τῷ παιδὶ Κυρίου τῷ Δαυΐδ, ἃ ἐλάλησεν τῷ Κυρίῳ τοὺς λόγους τῆς ᾠδῆς ταύτης ἐν ἡμέρᾳ, ᾗ ἐῤῥύσατο αὐτὸν ὁ Κύριος ἐκ χειρὸς πάντων τῶν ἐχθρῶν αὐτοῦ καὶ ἐκ χειρὸς Σαούλ,
1	וַיֹּאמַ֡ר אֶרְחׇמְךָ֖ יְהֹוָ֣ה חִזְקִֽי׃	I will love thee, O LORD, my strength.	καὶ εἶπεν· - ΑΓΑΠΗΣΩ σε, Κύριε, ἡ ἰσχύς μου.
2	יְהֹוָ֤ה ׀ סַ֥לְעִ֥י וּמְצוּדָתִ֗י וּמְפַ֫לְטִ֥י אֵלִ֣י צ֭וּרִי אֶֽחֱסֶה־בּ֑וֹ מָֽגִנִּ֥י וְקֶֽרֶן־יִ֝שְׁעִ֗י מִשְׂגַּבִּֽי׃	The LORD is my rock, and my fortress, and my deliverer; my God, my strength, in whom I will trust; my buckler, and the horn of my salvation, and my high tower.	Κύριος στερέωμά μου καὶ καταφυγή μου καὶ ῥύστης μου. ῾Ο Θεός μου βοηθός μου, ἐλπιῶ ἐπ᾿ αὐτόν, ὑπερασπιστής μου καὶ κέρας σωτηρίας μου καὶ ἀντιλήπτωρ μου.
3	מְ֭הֻלָּל אֶקְרָ֣א יְהֹוָ֑ה וּמִן־אֹ֝יְבַ֗י אִוָּשֵֽׁעַ׃	I will call upon the LORD, who is worthy to be praised: so shall I be saved from mine enemies.	αἰνῶν ἐπικαλέσομαι τὸν Κύριον καὶ ἐκ τῶν ἐχθρῶν μου σωθήσομαι.
4	אֲפָפ֥וּנִי חֶבְלֵי־מָ֑וֶת וְֽנַחֲלֵ֖י בְלִיַּ֣עַל יְבַֽעֲתֽוּנִי׃	The sorrows of death compassed me, and the floods of ungodly men made me afraid.	περιέσχον με ὠδῖνες θανάτου, καὶ χείμαρροι ἀνομίας ἐξετάραξάν με.
5	חֶבְלֵ֣י שְׁא֣וֹל סְבָב֑וּנִי קִ֝דְּמ֗וּנִי מ֣וֹקְשֵׁי מָֽוֶת׃	The sorrows of hell compassed me about: the snares of death prevented me.	ὠδῖνες ᾅδου περιεκύκλωσάν με, προέφθασάν με παγίδες θανάτου.
6	בַּצַּר־לִ֤י ׀ אֶ֥קְרָ֣א יְהֹוָה֮ וְאֶל־אֱלֹהַ֢י אֲשַׁ֫וֵּ֥עַ יִשְׁמַ֣ע מֵהֵיכָל֣וֹ קוֹלִ֑י וְ֝שַׁוְעָתִ֗י לְפָנָ֤יו ׀ תָּב֬וֹא בְאׇזְנָֽיו׃	In my distress I called upon the LORD, and cried unto my God: he heard my voice out of his temple, and my cry came before him, even into his ears.	καὶ ἐν τῷ θλίβεσθαί με ἐπεκαλεσάμην τὸν Κύριον καὶ πρὸς τὸν Θεόν μου ἐκέκραξα· ἤκουσεν ἐκ ναοῦ ἁγίου αὐτοῦ φωνῆς μου, καὶ ἡ κραυγή μου ἐνώπιον αὐτοῦ εἰσελεύσεται εἰς τὰ ὦτα αὐτοῦ.
7	וַתִּגְעַ֬שׁ וַתִּרְעַ֨שׁ ׀ הָאָ֗רֶץ וּמוֹסְדֵ֣י הָרִ֣ים יִרְגָּ֑זוּ וַ֝יִּתְגָּֽעֲשׁ֗וּ כִּי־חָ֥רָה לֽוֹ׃	Then the earth shook and trembled; the foundations also of the hills moved and were shaken, because he was wroth.	καὶ ἐσαλεύθη καὶ ἔντρομος ἐγενήθη ἡ γῆ, καὶ τὰ θεμέλια τῶν ὀρέων ἐταράχθησαν καὶ ἐσαλεύθησαν, ὅτι ὠργίσθη αὐτοῖς ὁ Θεός.
8	עָ֘לָ֤ה עָשָׁ֨ן ׀ בְּאַפּ֗וֹ וְאֵשׁ־מִפִּ֥יו תֹּאכֵ֑ל גֶּ֝חָלִ֗ים בָּעֲר֥וּ מִמֶּֽנּוּ׃	There went up a smoke out of his nostrils, and fire out of his mouth devoured: coals were kindled by it.	ἀνέβη καπνὸς ἐν ὀργῇ αὐτοῦ καὶ πῦρ ἀπὸ προσώπου αὐτοῦ καταφλεγήσεται, ἄνθρακες ἀνήφθησαν ἀπ᾿ αὐτοῦ.
9	וַיֵּ֣ט שָׁ֭מַיִם וַיֵּרַ֑ד וַ֝עֲרָפֶ֗ל תַּ֣חַת רַגְלָֽיו׃	He bowed the heavens also, and came down: and darkness was under his feet.	καὶ ἔκλινεν οὐρανοὺς καὶ κατέβη, καὶ γνόφος ὑπὸ τοὺς πόδας αὐτοῦ.
10	וַיִּרְכַּ֣ב עַל־כְּ֭רוּב וַיָּעֹ֑ף וַ֝יֵּ֗דֶא עַל־כַּנְפֵי־רֽוּחַ׃	And he rode upon a cherub, and did fly: yea, he did fly upon the wings of the wind.	καὶ ἐπέβη ἐπὶ Χερουβὶμ καὶ ἐπετάσθη, ἐπετάσθη ἐπὶ πτερύγων ἀνέμων.
11	יָ֤שֶׁת חֹ֨שֶׁךְ ׀ סִתְר֗וֹ סְבִֽיבוֹתָ֥יו סֻכָּת֑וֹ חֶשְׁכַת־מַ֝֗יִם עָבֵ֥י שְׁחָקִֽים׃	He made darkness his secret place; his pavilion round about him were dark waters and thick clouds of the skies.	καὶ ἔθετο σκότος ἀποκρυφὴν αὐτοῦ· κύκλῳ αὐτοῦ ἡ σκηνὴ αὐτοῦ, σκοτεινὸν ὕδωρ ἐν νεφέλαις ἀέρων.
12	מִנֹּ֗גַהּ נֶ֫גְדּ֥וֹ עָבָ֥יו עָבְר֑וּ בָּ֝רָ֗ד וְגַֽחֲלֵי־אֵֽשׁ׃	At the brightness that was before him his thick clouds passed, hail stones and coals of fire.	ἀπὸ τῆς τηλαυγήσεως ἐνώπιον αὐτοῦ αἱ νεφέλαι διῆλθον, χάλαζα καὶ ἄνθρακες πυρός.
13	וַיַּרְעֵ֬ם בַּשָּׁמַ֨יִם ׀ יְֽהֹוָ֗ה וְ֭עֶלְיוֹן יִתֵּ֣ן קֹל֑וֹ בָּ֝רָ֗ד וְגַֽחֲלֵי־אֵֽשׁ׃	The LORD also thundered in the heavens, and the Highest gave his voice; hail stones and coals of fire.	καὶ ἐβρόντησεν ἐξ οὐρανοῦ Κύριος, καὶ ὁ ῞Υψιστος ἔδωκε φωνὴν αὐτοῦ·
14	וַיִּשְׁלַ֣ח חִ֭צָּיו וַיְפִיצֵ֑ם וּבְרָקִ֥ים רָ֝֗ב וַיְהֻמֵּֽם׃	Yea, he sent out his arrows, and scattered them; and he shot out lightnings, and discomfited them.	ἐξαπέστειλε βέλη καὶ ἐσκόρπισεν αὐτοὺς καὶ ἀστραπὰς ἐπλήθυνε καὶ συνετάραξεν αὐτούς.
15	וַיֵּ֤רָא֨וּ ׀ אֲפִ֥יקֵי מַ֗יִם וַֽיִּגָּלוּ֮ מוֹסְד֢וֹת תֵּ֫בֵ֥ל מִגַּעֲרָ֣תְךָ֣ יְהֹוָ֑ה מִ֝נִּשְׁמַ֗ת ר֣וּחַ אַפֶּֽךָ׃	Then the channels of waters were seen, and the foundations of the world were discovered at thy rebuke, O LORD, at the blast of the breath of thy nostrils.	καὶ ὤφθησαν αἱ πηγαὶ τῶν ὑδάτων, καὶ ἀνεκαλύφθη τὰ θεμέλια τῆς οἰκουμένης ἀπὸ ἐπιτιμήσεώς σου, Κύριε, ἀπὸ ἐμπνεύσεως πνεύματος ὀργῆς σου.
16	יִשְׁלַ֣ח מִ֭מָּרוֹם יִקָּחֵ֑נִי יַֽ֝מְשֵׁ֗נִי מִמַּ֥יִם רַבִּֽים׃	He sent from above, he took me, he drew me out of many waters.	ἐξαπέστειλεν ἐξ ὕψους καὶ ἔλαβέ με, προσελάβετό με ἐξ ὑδάτων πολλῶν.
17	יַצִּילֵ֗נִי מֵאֹיְבִ֥י עָ֑ז וּ֝מִשֹּׂנְאַ֗י כִּֽי־אָמְצ֥וּ מִמֶּֽנִּי׃	He delivered me from my strong enemy, and from them which hated me: for they were too strong for me.	ρύσεταί με ἐξ ἐχθρῶν μου δυνατῶν, καὶ ἐκ τῶν μισούντων με, ὅτι ἐστερεώθησαν ὑπὲρ ἐμέ.
18	יְקַדְּמ֥וּנִי בְיוֹם־אֵידִ֑י וַֽיְהִי־יְהֹוָ֖ה לְמִשְׁעָ֣ן לִֽי׃	They prevented me in the day of my calamity: but the LORD was my stay.	προέφθασάν με ἐν ἡμέρᾳ κακώσεώς μου, καὶ ἐγένετο Κύριος ἀντιστήριγμά μου
19	וַיּוֹצִיאֵ֥נִי לַמֶּרְחָ֑ב יְ֝חַלְּצֵ֗נִי כִּ֘י חָ֥פֵֽץ בִּֽי׃	He brought me forth also into a large place; he delivered me, because he delighted in me.	καὶ ἐξήγαγέ με εἰς πλατυσμόν, ρύσεταί με, ὅτι ἠθέλησέ με.
20	יִגְמְלֵ֣נִי יְהֹוָ֣ה כְּצִדְקִ֑י כְּבֹ֥ר יָ֝דַ֗י יָשִׁ֥יב לִֽי׃	The LORD rewarded me according to my righteousness; according to the cleanness of my hands hath he recompensed me.	καὶ ἀνταποδώσει μοι Κύριος κατὰ τὴν δικαιοσύνην μου καὶ κατὰ τὴν καθαριότητα τῶν χειρῶν μου ἀνταποδώσει μοι,
21	כִּֽי־שָׁ֭מַרְתִּי דַּרְכֵ֣י יְהֹוָ֑ה וְלֹֽא־רָ֝שַׁ֗עְתִּי מֵאֱלֹהָֽי׃	For I have kept the ways of the LORD, and have not wickedly departed from my God.	ὅτι ἐφύλαξα τὰς ὁδοὺς Κυρίου καὶ οὐκ ἠσέβησα ἀπὸ τοῦ Θεοῦ μου,
22	כִּ֣י כׇל־מִשְׁפָּטָ֣יו לְנֶגְדִּ֑י וְ֝חֻקֹּתָ֗יו לֹא־אָסִ֥יר מֶֽנִּי׃	For all his judgments were before me, and I did not put away his statutes from me.	ὅτι πάντα τὰ κρίματα αὐτοῦ ἐνώπιόν μου, καὶ τὰ δικαιώματα αὐτοῦ οὐκ ἀπέστησαν ἀπ᾿ ἐμοῦ.
23	וָאֱהִ֣י תָמִ֣ים עִמּ֑וֹ וָ֝אֶשְׁתַּמֵּ֗ר מֵעֲוֺנִֽי׃	I was also upright before him, and I kept myself from mine iniquity.	καὶ ἔσομαι ἄμωμος μετ᾿ αὐτοῦ καὶ φυλάξομαι ἀπὸ τῆς ἀνομίας μου.
24	וַיָּֽשֶׁב־יְהֹוָ֣ה לִ֣י כְצִדְקִ֑י כְּבֹ֥ר יָ֝דַ֗י לְנֶ֣גֶד עֵינָֽיו׃	Therefore hath the LORD recompensed me according to my righteousness, according to the cleanness of my hands in his eyesight.	καὶ ἀνταποδώσει μοι Κύριος κατὰ τὴν δικαιοσύνην μου καὶ κατὰ τὴν καθαριότητα τῶν χειρῶν μου ἐνώπιον τῶν ὀφθαλμῶν αὐτοῦ.
25	עִם־חָסִ֥יד תִּתְחַסָּ֑ד עִם־גְּבַ֥ר תָּ֝מִ֗ים תִּתַּמָּֽם׃	With the merciful thou wilt shew thyself merciful; with an upright man thou wilt shew thyself upright;	μετὰ ὁσίου ὅσιος ἔσῃ, καὶ μετὰ ἀνδρὸς ἀθῴου ἀθῷος ἔσῃ,
26	עִם־נָבָ֥ר תִּתְבָּרָ֑ר וְעִם־עִ֝קֵּ֗שׁ תִּתְפַּתָּֽל׃	With the pure thou wilt shew thyself pure; and with the froward thou wilt shew thyself froward.	καὶ μετὰ ἐκλεκτοῦ ἐκλεκτὸς ἔσῃ καὶ μετὰ στρεβλοῦ διαστρέψεις.
27	כִּֽי־אַ֭תָּה עַם־עָנִ֣י תוֹשִׁ֑יעַ וְעֵינַ֖יִם רָמ֣וֹת תַּשְׁפִּֽיל׃	For thou wilt save the afflicted people; but wilt bring down high looks.	ὅτι σὺ λαὸν ταπεινὸν σώσεις καὶ ὀφθαλμοὺς ὑπερηφάνων ταπεινώσεις.
28	כִּֽי־אַ֭תָּה תָּאִ֣יר נֵרִ֑י יְהֹוָ֥ה אֱ֝לֹהַ֗י יַגִּ֥יהַּ חׇשְׁכִּֽי׃	For thou wilt light my candle: the LORD my God will enlighten my darkness.	ὅτι σὺ φωτιεῖς λύχνον μου, Κύριε ὁ Θεός μου, φωτιεῖς τὸ σκότος μου.
29	כִּֽי־בְ֭ךָ אָרֻ֣ץ גְּד֑וּד וּ֝בֵֽאלֹהַ֗י אֲדַלֶּג־שֽׁוּר׃	For by thee I have run through a troop; and by my God have I leaped over a wall.	ὅτι ἐν σοὶ ῥυσθήσομαι ἀπὸ πειρατηρίου καὶ ἐν τῷ Θεῷ μου ὑπερβήσομαι τεῖχος.
30	הָאֵל֮ תָּמִ֢ים דַּ֫רְכּ֥וֹ אִמְרַֽת־יְהֹוָ֥ה צְרוּפָ֑ה מָגֵ֥ן ה֝֗וּא לְכֹ֤ל ׀ הַחֹסִ֬ים בּֽוֹ׃	As for God, his way is perfect: the word of the LORD is tried: he is a buckler to all those that trust in him.	ὁ Θεός μου, ἄμωμος ἡ ὁδὸς αὐτοῦ, τὰ λόγια Κυρίου πεπυρωμένα, ὑπερασπιστής ἐστι πάντων τῶν ἐλπιζόντων ἐπ᾿ αὐτόν.
31	כִּ֤י מִ֣י אֱ֭לוֹהַּ מִבַּלְעֲדֵ֣י יְהֹוָ֑ה וּמִ֥י צ֝֗וּר זוּלָתִ֥י אֱלֹהֵֽינוּ׃	For who is God save the LORD? or who is a rock save our God?	ὅτι τίς Θεὸς πλὴν τοῦ Κυρίου, καὶ τίς Θεὸς πλὴν τοῦ Θεοῦ ἡμῶν;
32	הָ֭אֵל הַמְאַזְּרֵ֣נִי חָ֑יִל וַיִּתֵּ֖ן תָּמִ֣ים דַּרְכִּֽי׃	It is God that girdeth me with strength, and maketh my way perfect.	ὁ Θεὸς ὁ περιζωννύων με δύναμιν καὶ ἔθετο ἄμωμον τὴν ὁδόν μου·
33	מְשַׁוֶּ֣ה רַ֭גְלַי כָּאַיָּל֑וֹת וְעַ֥ל בָּ֝מֹתַ֗י יַעֲמִידֵֽנִי׃	He maketh my feet like hinds' feet, and setteth me upon my high places.	καταρτιζόμενος τοὺς πόδας μου ὡσεὶ ἐλάφου καὶ ἐπὶ τὰ ὑψηλὰ ἱστῶν με·
34	מְלַמֵּ֣ד יָ֭דַי לַמִּלְחָמָ֑ה וְֽנִחֲתָ֥ה קֶֽשֶׁת־נְ֝חוּשָׁ֗ה זְרוֹעֹתָֽי׃	He teacheth my hands to war, so that a bow of steel is broken by mine arms.	διδάσκων χεῖράς μου εἰς πόλεμον καὶ ἔθου τόξον χαλκοῦν τοὺς βραχίονάς μου·
35	וַתִּתֶּן־לִי֮ מָגֵ֢ן יִ֫שְׁעֶ֥ךָ וִֽימִינְךָ֥ תִסְעָדֵ֑נִי וְֽעַנְוַתְךָ֥ תַרְבֵּֽנִי׃	Thou hast also given me the shield of thy salvation: and thy right hand hath holden me up, and thy gentleness hath made me great.	καὶ ἔδωκάς μοι ὑπερασπισμὸν σωτηρίας, καὶ ἡ δεξιά σου ἀντελάβετό μου, καὶ ἡ παιδεία σου ἀνώρθωσέ με εἰς τέλος, καὶ ἡ παιδεία σου αὐτή με διδάξει.
36	תַּרְחִ֣יב צַעֲדִ֣י תַחְתָּ֑י וְלֹ֥א מָ֝עֲד֗וּ קַרְסֻלָּֽי׃	Thou hast enlarged my steps under me, that my feet did not slip.	ἐπλάτυνας τὰ διαβήματά μου ὑποκάτω μου, καὶ οὐκ ἠσθένησαν τὰ ἴχνη μου.
37	אֶרְדּ֣וֹף א֭וֹיְבַי וְאַשִּׂיגֵ֑ם וְלֹֽא־אָ֝שׁ֗וּב עַד־כַּלּוֹתָֽם׃	I have pursued mine enemies, and overtaken them: neither did I turn again till they were consumed.	καταδιώξω τοὺς ἐχθρούς μου καὶ καταλήψομαι αὐτοὺς καὶ οὐκ ἀποστραφήσομαι, ἕως ἂν ἐκλίπωσιν·
38	אֶ֭מְחָצֵם וְלֹא־יֻ֣כְלוּ ק֑וּם יִ֝פְּל֗וּ תַּ֣חַת רַגְלָֽי׃	I have wounded them that they were not able to rise: they are fallen under my feet.	ἐκθλίψω αὐτούς, καὶ οὐ μὴ δύνωνται στῆναι, πεσοῦνται ὑπὸ τοὺς πόδας μου.
39	וַתְּאַזְּרֵ֣נִי חַ֭יִל לַמִּלְחָמָ֑ה תַּכְרִ֖יעַ קָמַ֣י תַּחְתָּֽי׃	For thou hast girded me with strength unto the battle: thou hast subdued under me those that rose up against me.	καὶ περιέζωσάς με δύναμιν εἰς πόλεμον, συνεπόδισας πάντας τοὺς ἐπανισταμένους ἐπ᾿ ἐμὲ ὑποκάτω μου.
40	וְֽאֹיְבַ֗י נָתַ֣תָּה לִּ֣י עֹ֑רֶף וּ֝מְשַׂנְאַ֗י אַצְמִיתֵֽם׃	Thou hast also given me the necks of mine enemies; that I might destroy them that hate me.	καὶ τοὺς ἐχθρούς μου ἔδωκάς μοι νῶτον καὶ τοὺς μισοῦντάς με ἐξωλόθρευσας.
41	יְשַׁוְּע֥וּ וְאֵין־מוֹשִׁ֑יעַ עַל־יְ֝הֹוָ֗ה וְלֹ֣א עָנָֽם׃	They cried, but there was none to save them: even unto the LORD, but he answered them not.	ἐκέκραξαν, καὶ οὐκ ἦν ὁ σῴζων, πρὸς Κύριον, καὶ οὐκ εἰσήκουσεν αὐτῶν.
42	וְֽאֶשְׁחָקֵ֗ם כְּעָפָ֥ר עַל־פְּנֵי־ר֑וּחַ כְּטִ֖יט חוּצ֣וֹת אֲרִיקֵֽם׃	Then did I beat them small as the dust before the wind: I did cast them out as the dirt in the streets.	καὶ λεπτυνῶ αὐτοὺς ὡσεὶ χνοῦν κατὰ πρόσωπον ἀνέμου, ὡς πηλὸν πλατειῶν λεανῶ αὐτούς.
43	תְּפַלְּטֵנִי֮ מֵרִ֢יבֵ֫י עָ֥ם תְּ֭שִׂימֵנִי לְרֹ֣אשׁ גּוֹיִ֑ם עַ֖ם לֹא־יָדַ֣עְתִּי יַֽעַבְדֽוּנִי׃	Thou hast delivered me from the strivings of the people; and thou hast made me the head of the heathen: a people whom I have not known shall serve me.	ρύσῃ με ἐξ ἀντιλογίας λαοῦ, καταστήσεις με εἰς κεφαλὴν ἐθνῶν. λαός, ὃν οὐκ ἔγνων, ἐδούλευσέ μοι,
44	לְשֵׁ֣מַֽע אֹ֭זֶן יִשָּׁ֣מְעוּ לִ֑י בְּנֵֽי־נֵ֝כָ֗ר יְכַחֲשׁוּ־לִֽי׃	As soon as they hear of me, they shall obey me: the strangers shall submit themselves unto me.	εἰς ἀκοὴν ὠτίου ὑπήκουσέ μου· υἱοὶ ἀλλότριοι ἐψεύσαντό μοι,
45	בְּנֵי־נֵכָ֥ר יִבֹּ֑לוּ וְ֝יַחְרְג֗וּ מִֽמִּסְגְּרֽוֹתֵיהֶֽם׃	The strangers shall fade away, and be afraid out of their close places.	υἱοὶ ἀλλότριοι ἐπαλαιώθησαν καὶ ἐχώλαναν ἀπὸ τῶν τρίβων αὐτῶν.
46	חַי־יְ֭הֹוָה וּבָר֣וּךְ צוּרִ֑י וְ֝יָר֗וּם אֱלוֹהֵ֥י יִשְׁעִֽי׃	The LORD liveth; and blessed be my rock; and let the God of my salvation be exalted.	ζῇ Κύριος, καὶ εὐλογητὸς ὁ Θεός μου καὶ ὑψωθήτω ὁ Θεὸς τῆς σωτηρίας μου,
47	הָאֵ֗ל הַנּוֹתֵ֣ן נְקָמ֣וֹת לִ֑י וַיַּדְבֵּ֖ר עַמִּ֣ים תַּחְתָּֽי׃	It is God that avengeth me, and subdueth the people under me.	ὁ Θεὸς ὁ διδοὺς ἐκδικήσεις ἐμοί, καὶ ὑποτάξας λαοὺς ὑπ᾿ ἐμέ,
48	מְפַלְּטִ֗י מֵאֹ֫יְבָ֥י אַ֣ף מִן־קָ֭מַי תְּרוֹמְמֵ֑נִי מֵאִ֥ישׁ חָ֝מָ֗ס תַּצִּילֵֽנִי׃	He delivereth me from mine enemies: yea, thou liftest me up above those that rise up against me: thou hast delivered me from the violent man.	ὁ ῥύστης μου ἐξ ἐχθρῶν μου ὀργίλων, ἀπὸ τῶν ἐπανισταμένων ἐπ᾿ ἐμὲ ὑψώσεις με, ἀπὸ ἀνδρὸς ἀδίκου ρῦσαί με.
49	עַל־כֵּ֤ן ׀ אוֹדְךָ֖ בַגּוֹיִ֥ם ׀ יְהֹוָ֑ה וּלְשִׁמְךָ֥ אֲזַמֵּֽרָה׃	Therefore will I give thanks unto thee, O LORD, among the heathen, and sing praises unto thy name.	διὰ τοῦτο ἐξομολογήσομαί σοι ἐν ἔθνεσι, Κύριε, καὶ τῷ ὀνόματί σου ψαλῶ,
50	מַגְדִּל֮ יְשׁוּע֢וֹת מַ֫לְכּ֥וֹ וְעֹ֤שֶׂה חֶ֨סֶד ׀ לִמְשִׁיח֗וֹ לְדָוִ֥ד וּלְזַרְע֗וֹ עַד־עוֹלָֽם׃	Great deliverance giveth he to his king; and sheweth mercy to his anointed, to David, and to his seed for evermore.	μεγαλύνων τὰς σωτηρίας τοῦ βασιλέως αὐτοῦ, καὶ ποιῶν ἔλεος τῷ χριστῷ αὐτοῦ, τῷ Δαυΐδ καὶ τῷ σπέρματι αὐτοῦ ἕως αἰῶνος.

== Usage ==
William Blake. David Delivered out of Many Waters

=== Judaism ===
- This psalm is recited on the seventh day of Passover in some traditions.
- Verse 32 is recited before Ein Keloheinu.
- On most days, verse 50 is recited at the end of Birkat Hamazon; on all other days, the almost identical verse from 2 Samuel 22 is recited instead.

=== New Testament ===
Some verses of Psalm 18 are referenced in the New Testament:

- Verse 2b is cited in Hebrews 2:13
- Verse 49 is cited in Romans 15:9

=== Book of Common Prayer ===
In the Church of England's Book of Common Prayer, Psalm 18 is appointed to be read on the evening of the third day of the month.

== Musical settings ==
The first line of Psalm 18 was paraphrased in the German hymn "Ich will dich lieben, meine Stärke" by Angelus Silesius in 1657. Heinrich Schütz set a metred paraphrase of Psalm 18 in German, "Ich lieb dich, Herr, von Herzen sehr", SWV 114, as part of the Becker Psalter.

The American composer Steve Reich set part of the Hebrew text in his 1981 work Tehillim.
