= Papyrus 116 =

- New Testament manuscript
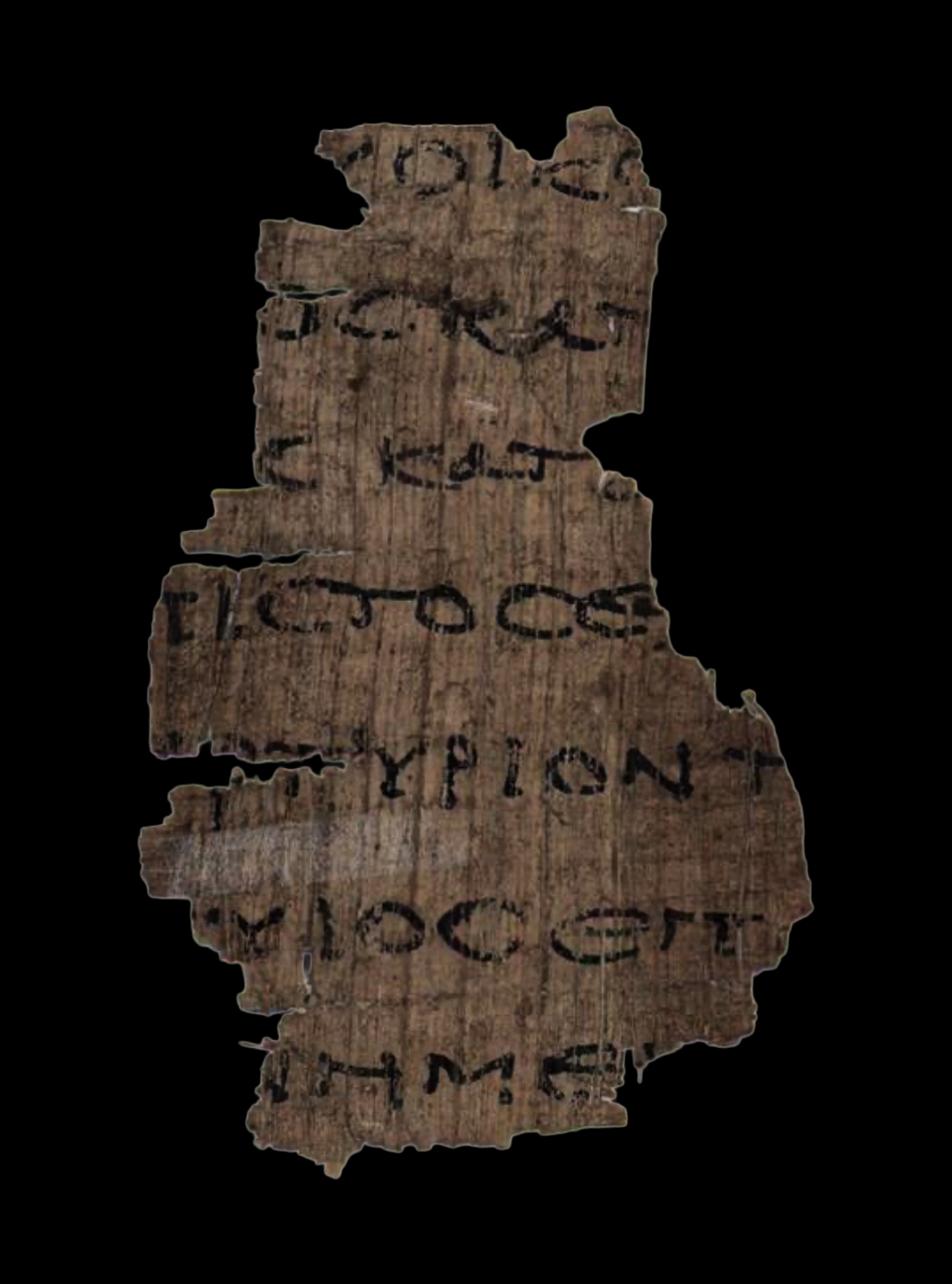
- Recto, Heb 2:9-11
- Name: P. Vindob. G 42417
- Sign: 𝔓^{116}
- Text: Epistle to the Hebrews 2:9-11; 3:3-6
- Date: 6th century
- Script: Greek
- Now at: Austrian National Library
- Cite: A. Papathomas, A new testimony to the Letter to the Hebrews Journal of Greco-Roman Christianity and Judaism 1 (2000), pp. 18-23
- Size: [31] x [18] cm
- Type: (?)
- Category: none

Papyrus 116 (in the Gregory-Aland numbering), designated by 𝔓^{116}, is a copy of part of the New Testament in Greek. It is a papyrus manuscript of the Letter to the Hebrews. The surviving text of Hebrews are verses 2:9-11; 3:3-6. They are in a fragmentary condition. The manuscript palaeographically has been assigned by the INTF to the 6th century (or 7th century).

The text of the codex was edited by A. Papathomas in 2000.

Text

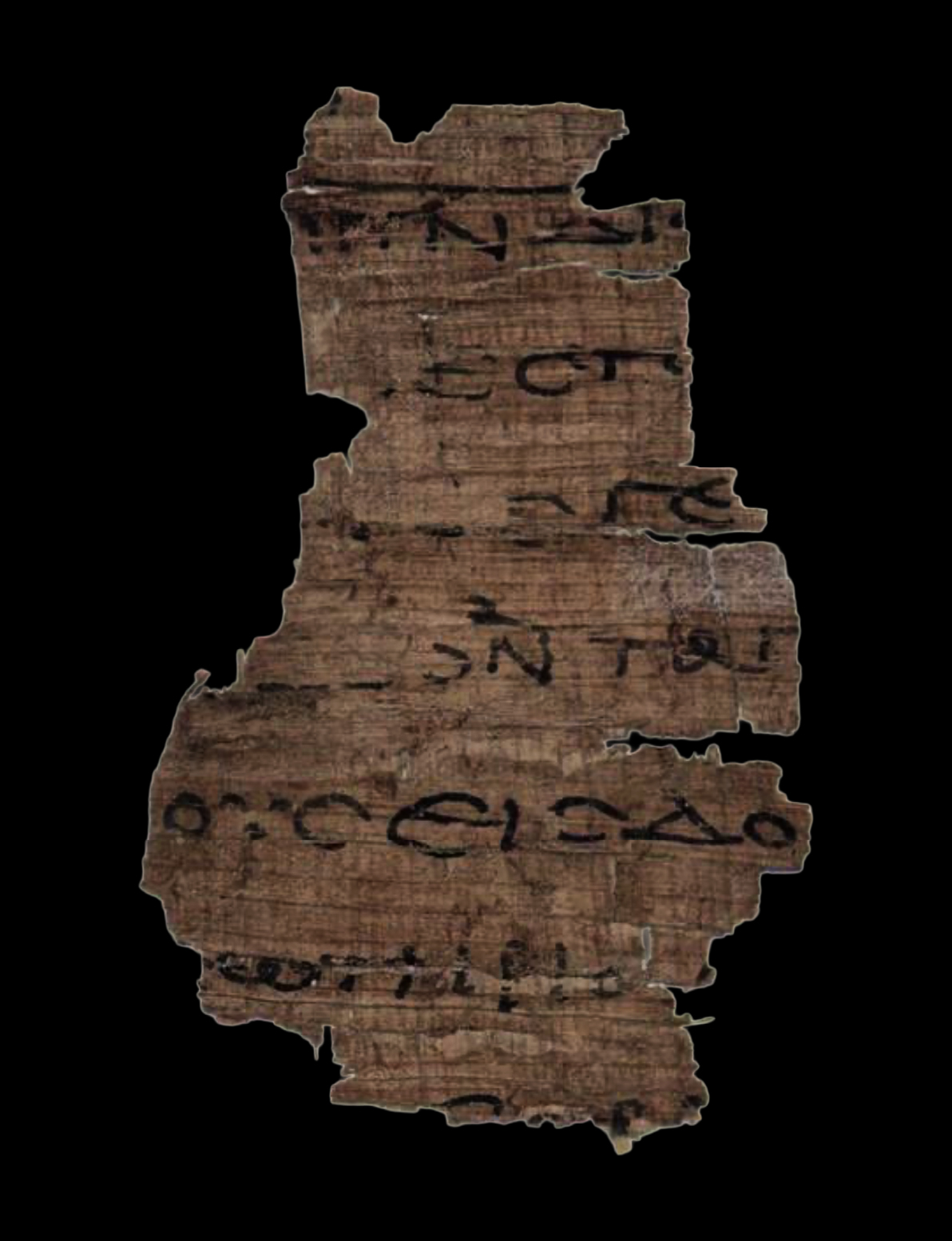
Verso, Hebrews 3:3-6

The Greek text of this codex is too small to determine its textual character.

Location

The codex currently is housed at the Austrian National Library (Pap. G. 42417) at Vienna. The fragments are also commonly referred to as P. Vindob. G 42417.

== See also ==
- List of New Testament papyri
- Epistle to the Hebrews: chapter 2 and 3
