= 2 Samuel 23 =

Second Book of Samuel chapter

- ← chapter 22 chapter 24 →
- The complete Hebrew text of the Books of Samuel (1 and 2 Samuel) in the Leningrad Codex (1008)
- Book: Books of Samuel
- Hebrew Bible part: Nevi'im
- Order in the Hebrew part: 3
- Category: Former Prophets
- Christian Bible part: Old Testament
- Order in the Christian part: 10

2 Samuel 23 is the 23rd chapter in the second parts of the Books of Samuel in the Hebrew Bible (or the 23rd chapter of the "Second Book of Samuel" in the Old Testament of the Christian Bible). It contains a prophetic statement described as the "last words of David" (verses 1–7) and details of the 37 "mighty men" who were David's chief warriors (verses 8–39).

== Text ==
The original text of this chapter was written in the Hebrew language. This chapter is divided into 39 verses.

=== Textual versions ===
Some ancient witnesses for the text of this chapter in Hebrew are of the Masoretic Text, which includes the Codex Cairensis (895), Aleppo Codex (10th century), Codex Leningradensis (1008). Fragments containing parts of this chapter in Hebrew were found among the Dead Sea Scrolls including 1Q7 (1QSam; 50 BCE) with extant verses 9–12 and 4Q51 (4QSam^{a}; 100 ‑ 50 BCE) with extant verses 1–6, 14–16, 21–22, 38–39.

There is also a translation into Koine Greek known as the Septuagint, made in the last few centuries BC. Extant ancient manuscripts of the Septuagint version include Codex Vaticanus (B; $\mathfrak{G}$^{B}; 4th century), Codex Sinaiticus (S; BHK: $\mathfrak{G}$^{S}; 4th century), and Codex Alexandrinus (A; $\mathfrak{G}$^{A}; 5th century).

== Analysis ==
The Jerusalem Bible states that last words were attributed to David in the style of Jacob (see Jacob's Blessing, Genesis 49) and Moses (see Blessing of Moses, Deuteronomy 33). Its editors note that "the text has suffered considerably and reconstructions are conjectural".

1 Kings 2:1–9 contains David's final words to Solomon, his son and successor as king.

== David's last words (23:1–7) ==
The last words of David do not consist of a blessing (or "benediction") to Israel (unlike the blessing of Jacob in Genesis 49 or the blessing of Moses in Deuteronomy 33), but David is portrayed as a prophet speaking a prophecy (oracle) similar to Moses in Deuteronomy 32–33.

=== Verse 1 ===
Now these are the last words of David.

Thus says David the son of Jesse;
Thus says the man raised up on high,
The anointed of the God of Jacob,
And the sweet psalmist of Israel:

- "Anointed" (Biblical Hebrew: מְשִׁ֙יחַ֙; mashiach): "Messiah", a royal title that here refers to David, echoing 2 Samuel 22:51.
- "Psalmist" (Hebrew: זְמִר֥וֹת; zəmirōṯ; from the root word: zamir, translated: "song"): can be rendered as "singer of songs", which refers to David; translated as the "Strong One" in NRSV which is interpreted as an epithet for Yahweh.

== David's mighty men (23:8–39) ==
The list of David's warriors consists of several sections. The first part is about 'the Three' (the term used in LXX and Vulgate) with their names—Josheb-basshebeth, Eleazar and Shammah—and deeds (verses 8b–12, possibly until 17b). The second part is about the 'three of the thirty' (verses 13–17a) who were different from the first three, but also whose membership in the thirty is also uncertain, so probably somewhere between these two groups. The list of the Thirty starts with Asahel in verse 24, then the following warriors may be arranged geographically, with places in verses 24–35 being the closest to Bethlehem, and those in verses 36–39 were non-Israelites.

== See also ==
- David
- Uriah the Hittite
- Related Bible parts: 2 Samuel 11, 2 Samuel 12, 1 Chronicles 11

== Sources ==
- Coogan, Michael David (2007). Coogan, Michael David; Brettler, Marc Zvi; Newsom, Carol Ann; Perkins, Pheme (eds.). The New Oxford Annotated Bible with the Apocryphal/Deuterocanonical Books: New Revised Standard Version, Issue 48 (Augmented 3rd ed.). Oxford University Press. ISBN 9780195288810.
- Fitzmyer, Joseph A. (2008). A Guide to the Dead Sea Scrolls and Related Literature. Grand Rapids, MI: William B. Eerdmans Publishing Company. ISBN 9780802862419.
- Jones, Gwilym H. (2007). "12. 1 and 2 Samuel". In Barton, John; Muddiman, John (eds.). The Oxford Bible Commentary (first (paperback) ed.). Oxford University Press. pp. 196–232. ISBN 978-0199277186.
- Payne, D. F. (1994). "1 and 2 Samuel". In Carson, D. A.; France, R. T.; Motyer, J. A.; Wenham, G. J. (eds.). New Bible Commentary: 21st Century Edition (4, illustrated, reprint, revised ed.). Inter-Varsity Press. pp. 296–333. ISBN 9780851106489.
- Ulrich, Eugene, ed. (2010). The Biblical Qumran Scrolls: Transcriptions and Textual Variants. Brill.
- Würthwein, Ernst (1995). The Text of the Old Testament. Translated by Rhodes, Erroll F. Grand Rapids, MI: Wm. B. Eerdmans. ISBN 0-8028-0788-7.
