= Hebrews 3 =

- ← chapter 2 chapter 4 →
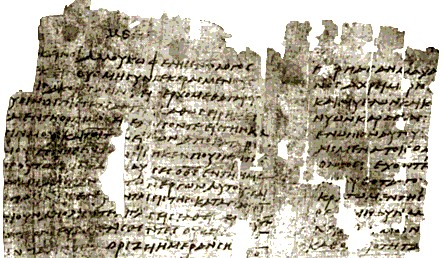
- Epistle to the Hebrews 2:14-5:5; 10:8-22; 10:29-11:13; 11:28-12:17 in Papyrus 13 (AD. 225-250).
- Book: Epistle to the Hebrews
- Category: General epistles
- Christian Bible part: New Testament
- Order in the Christian part: 19

Hebrews 3 is the third chapter of the Epistle to the Hebrews in the New Testament of the Christian Bible. The author is anonymous, although the internal reference to "our brother Timothy" (Hebrews 13:23) causes a traditional attribution to Paul, but this attribution has been disputed since the second century and there is no decisive evidence for the authorship. This chapter contains the comparison of Moses to Jesus ('the Son'), as well as the application and warning for the congregation.

== Text ==
The original text was written in Koine Greek. This chapter is divided into 19 verses.

=== Textual witnesses ===
Some early manuscripts containing the text of this chapter are:

- Papyrus 46 (c. 175–225; complete)
- Papyrus 13 (225-250; complete)
- Codex Vaticanus (325-350)
- Codex Sinaiticus (330-360)
- Codex Alexandrinus (400-440)
- Codex Ephraemi Rescriptus (~450; complete)
- Codex Freerianus (~450; extant verse 4–6, 14–16)
- Codex Claromontanus (~550)
- Codex Coislinianus (~550; extant verse 13–18)
- Papyrus 116 (6th century; extant verse 3–6)

=== Old Testament references ===
- Hebrews 3:2: 1 Samuel 12:6
- Hebrews 3:7–11: Psalm 95:7–11
- Hebrews 3:15: Psalm 95:7,8
- Hebrews 3:18: Psalm 95:7–11

== Moses and Jesus as Examples of Faith (3:1–6) ==
The faithfulness of Jesus to God as the one who appointed him is paralleled with the faithfulness of Moses, inviting us to completely trust Jesus.

=== Verse 1 ===
Therefore, holy brethren, partakers of the heavenly calling, consider the Apostle and High Priest of our confession, Christ Jesus,

- "Holy brethren": or "holy brothers" suggests a family relationship between true believers, both men and women, as 'pilgrims' who share in the heavenly calling to reign with Jesus Christ in 'the world to come' (2:5).

=== Verse 2 ===
who was faithful to Him who appointed Him, as Moses also was faithful in all His house.

Moses' foundational role as the revealer of God's will to Israel (Numbers 12:7) is highlighted.

=== Verse 3 ===
For this One has been counted worthy of more glory than Moses, inasmuch as He who built the house has more honor than the house.

- "The house": is rendered in Arabic version "the temple", may refer to Zechariah 6:12–13 pointing to Christ who is the builder, foundation, and cornerstone of "the church", from where he has a glory.

== A call to faithfulness (3:7–19) ==
The Holy Spirit, who is acknowledged as the one spoken 'through David' in Psalm 95 (3:7; 4:7), continues to speak to generations of Christians and warn them to 'make each day a fresh 'Today' to hear his voice and live'.

=== Verse 13 ===
But exhort one another daily, while it is called “Today,” lest any of you be hardened through the deceitfulness of sin.

- "While it is called "Today": that is, 'while the "to-day" lasts', referring to "the day of grace" (Luke 4:21, before the arrival of the day of glory and judgment at Christ's second coming (Hebrews 10:25, 37).

== See also ==
- Angel
- High priest
- Jesus Christ
- Moses
- Related Bible parts: Numbers 12, Numbers 14, Numbers 32, Deuteronomy 1, Deuteronomy 2, Psalm 95, Zechariah 6

== Sources ==
- Attridge, Harold W. (2007). "75. Hebrews". In Barton, John; Muddiman, John (eds.). The Oxford Bible Commentary (first (paperback) ed.). Oxford University Press. pp. 1236–1254. ISBN 978-0199277186.
- deSilva, David A. (2005). "Hebrews". In Evans, Craig A. (ed.). Bible Knowledge Background Commentary: John's Gospel, Hebrews-Revelation. The Bible Knowledge Series (illustrated ed.). Colorado Springs, Colo.: Victor. pp. 199–256. ISBN 9780781442282.
- Peterson, David (1994). "Hebrews". In Carson, D. A.; France, R. T.; Motyer, J. A.; Wenham, G. J. (eds.). New Bible Commentary: 21st Century Edition (4, illustrated, reprint, revised ed.). Inter-Varsity Press. pp. 1321–1353. ISBN 9780851106489.
