= Psalm 16 =

Biblical psalm

- "Preserve me, O God: for in thee do I put my trust"
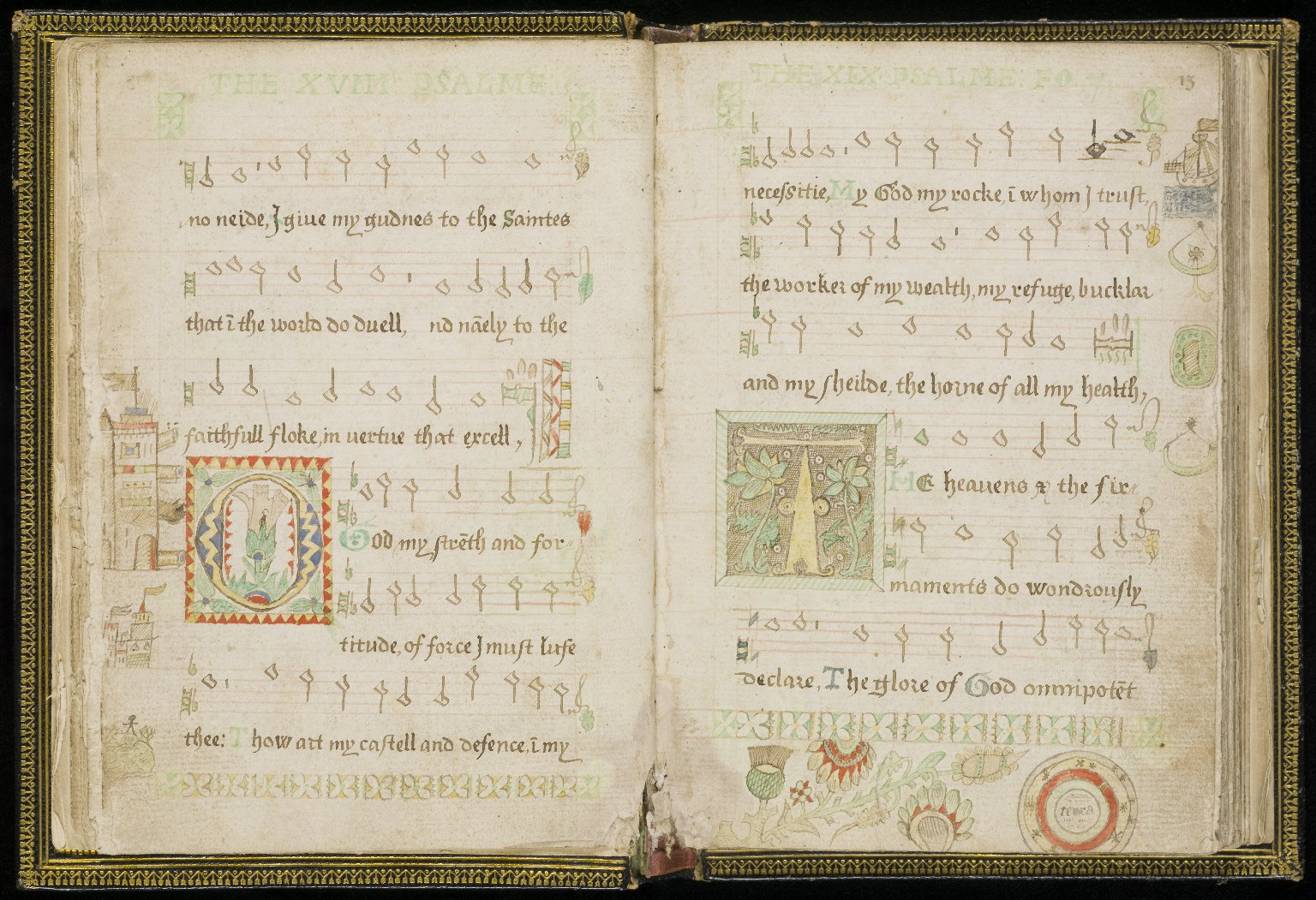
- Psalm 16 in a Scottish metrical psalter
- Other name: Psalm 15; "Conserva me Domine"
- Text: attributed to David
- Language: Hebrew (original)

Psalm 16
- ← Psalm 15 Psalm 17 →
- Book: Book of Psalms
- Hebrew Bible part: Ketuvim
- Order in the Hebrew part: 1
- Category: Sifrei Emet
- Christian Bible part: Old Testament
- Order in the Christian part: 19

Psalm 16 is the 16th psalm in the Book of Psalms, beginning in English in the King James Version: "Preserve me, O God: for in thee do I put my trust."

In the slightly different numbering system used in the Greek Septuagint and Latin Vulgate translations of the Bible, this psalm is Psalm 15. The Latin version begins "Conserva me Domine".

The psalm is attributed to David and described as a Michtam of David. Psalms 56-60 also share this title. Sarah Hoyt describes this term as "obscure". Semitic scholar Paul Haupt suggests that it may mean "restricted by the meter", or "conformed to poetical measure". The psalm forms a regular part of Jewish, Catholic, Anglican, Eastern Orthodox Church and Protestant liturgies. It has been set to music, including compositions by Marc-Antoine Charpentier and George Frideric Handel.

== Composition ==
Charles and Emilie Briggs summarized its contents as follows:

Ps[alm] 16 is a psalm of faith. The psalmist has sought refuge in Yahweh his sovereign Lord, and supreme welfare (v. 1-2); whose good pleasure is in His saints (v. 3). The apostates have many sorrows, and he keeps apart from them and their impious worship (v. 4). Yahweh is his portion and his inheritance in pleasant places (v. 5-6); he enjoys His counsel (v. 7) and continual helpful presence (v. 8); he is glad and secure (v. 9), confident that Yahweh will not abandon him in Sheol (v. 10), but will grant him life and joy forever in His presence (v.11).

According to the Briggs, the author of this Psalm drew on Jeremiah 23:6, 33:16; Deuteronomy 33:12; and the Book of Ezra for phrases and concepts, and most likely wrote the Psalm in the Persian period (i.e., after 539 BC).

== Text ==
The following table shows the Hebrew text of the Psalm with vowels, alongside the Koine Greek text in the Septuagint and the English translation from the King James Version. Note that the meaning can slightly differ between these versions, as the Septuagint and the Masoretic Text come from different textual traditions. (Note: A 1917 translation directly from Hebrew to English by the Jewish Publication Society can be found here or here, and an 1844 translation directly from the Septuagint by L. C. L. Brenton can be found here. Both translations are in the public domain.) In the Septuagint, this psalm is numbered Psalm 15.

#	Hebrew	English	Greek
1	מִכְתָּ֥ם לְדָוִ֑ד שׇֽׁמְרֵ֥נִי אֵ֝֗ל כִּֽי־חָסִ֥יתִי בָֽךְ׃	(Michtam of David.) Preserve me, O God: for in thee do I put my trust.	Στηλογραφία τῷ Δαυΐδ. - ΦΥΛΑΞΟΝ με, Κύριε, ὅτι ἐπὶ σοὶ ἤλπισα.
2	אָמַ֣רְתְּ לַֽ֭יהֹוָה אֲדֹנָ֣י אָ֑תָּה ט֝וֹבָתִ֗י בַּל־עָלֶֽיךָ׃	O my soul, thou hast said unto the LORD, Thou art my Lord: my goodness extendeth not to thee;	εἶπα τῷ Κυρίῳ· Κύριός μου εἶ σύ, ὅτι τῶν ἀγαθῶν μου οὐ χρείαν ἔχεις.
3	לִ֭קְדוֹשִׁים אֲשֶׁר־בָּאָ֣רֶץ הֵ֑מָּה וְ֝אַדִּירֵ֗י כׇּל־חֶפְצִי־בָֽם׃	But to the saints that are in the earth, and to the excellent, in whom is all my delight.	τοῖς ἁγίοις τοῖς ἐν τῇ γῇ αὐτοῦ ἐθαυμάστωσεν ὁ Κύριος, πάντα τὰ θελήματα αὐτοῦ ἐν αὐτοῖς.
4	יִרְבּ֥וּ עַצְּבוֹתָם֮ אַחֵ֢ר מָ֫הָ֥רוּ בַּל־אַסִּ֣יךְ נִסְכֵּיהֶ֣ם מִדָּ֑ם וּֽבַל־אֶשָּׂ֥א אֶת־שְׁ֝מוֹתָ֗ם עַל־שְׂפָתָֽי׃	Their sorrows shall be multiplied that hasten after another god: their drink offerings of blood will I not offer, nor take up their names into my lips.	ἐπληθύνθησαν αἱ ἀσθένειαι αὐτῶν, μετὰ ταῦτα ἐτάχυναν· οὐ μὴ συναγάγω τὰς συναγωγὰς αὐτῶν ἐξ αἱμάτων, οὐδ᾿ οὐ μὴ μνησθῶ τῶν ὀνομάτων αὐτῶν διὰ χειλέων μου.
5	יְֽהֹוָ֗ה מְנָת־חֶלְקִ֥י וְכוֹסִ֑י אַ֝תָּ֗ה תּוֹמִ֥יךְ גּוֹרָלִֽי׃	The LORD is the portion of mine inheritance and of my cup: thou maintainest my lot.	Κύριος μερὶς τῆς κληρονομίας μου καὶ τοῦ ποτηρίου μου· σὺ εἶ ὁ ἀποκαθιστῶν τὴν κληρονομίαν μου ἐμοί.
6	חֲבָלִ֣ים נָֽפְלוּ־לִ֭י בַּנְּעִמִ֑ים אַף־נַ֝חֲלָ֗ת שָֽׁפְרָ֥ה עָלָֽי׃	The lines are fallen unto me in pleasant places; yea, I have a goodly heritage.	σχοινία ἐπέπεσέ μοι ἐν τοῖς κρατίστοις· καὶ γὰρ ἡ κληρονομία μου κρατίστη μοί ἐστιν.
7	אֲבָרֵ֗ךְ אֶת־יְ֭הֹוָה אֲשֶׁ֣ר יְעָצָ֑נִי אַף־לֵ֝יל֗וֹת יִסְּר֥וּנִי כִלְיוֹתָֽי׃	I will bless the LORD, who hath given me counsel: my reins also instruct me in the night seasons.	εὐλογήσω τὸν Κύριον τὸν συνετίσαντά με· ἔτι δὲ καὶ ἕως νυκτὸς ἐπαίδευσάν με οἱ νεφροί μου.
8	שִׁוִּ֬יתִי יְהֹוָ֣ה לְנֶגְדִּ֣י תָמִ֑יד כִּ֥י מִֽ֝ימִינִ֗י בַּל־אֶמּֽוֹט׃	I have set the LORD always before me: because he is at my right hand, I shall not be moved.	προωρώμην τὸν Κύριον ἐνώπιόν μου διαπαντός, ὅτι ἐκ δεξιῶν μού ἐστιν, ἵνα μὴ σαλευθῶ.
9	לָכֵ֤ן ׀ שָׂמַ֣ח לִ֭בִּי וַיָּ֣גֶל כְּבוֹדִ֑י אַף־בְּ֝שָׂרִ֗י יִשְׁכֹּ֥ן לָבֶֽטַח׃	Therefore my heart is glad, and my glory rejoiceth: my flesh also shall rest in hope.	διὰ τοῦτο ηὐφράνθη ἡ καρδία μου, καὶ ἠγαλλιάσατο ἡ γλῶσσά μου, ἔτι δὲ καὶ ἡ σάρξ μου κατασκηνώσει ἐπ᾿ ἐλπίδι,
10	כִּ֤י ׀ לֹא־תַעֲזֹ֣ב נַפְשִׁ֣י לִשְׁא֑וֹל לֹֽא־תִתֵּ֥ן חֲ֝סִידְךָ֗ לִרְא֥וֹת שָֽׁחַת׃	For thou wilt not leave my soul in hell; neither wilt thou suffer thine Holy One to see corruption.	ὅτι οὐκ ἐγκαταλείψεις τὴν ψυχήν μου εἰς ᾅδην, οὐδὲ δώσεις τὸν ὅσιόν σου ἰδεῖν διαφθοράν.
11	תּֽוֹדִיעֵנִי֮ אֹ֤רַח חַ֫יִּ֥ים שֹׂ֣בַע שְׂ֭מָחוֹת אֶת־פָּנֶ֑יךָ נְעִמ֖וֹת בִּימִינְךָ֣ נֶֽצַח׃	Thou wilt shew me the path of life: in thy presence is fulness of joy; at thy right hand there are pleasures for evermore.	ἐγνώρισάς μοι ὁδοὺς ζωῆς· πληρώσεις με εὐφροσύνης μετὰ τοῦ προσώπου σου, τερπνότητες ἐν τῇ δεξιᾷ σου εἰς τέλος.

== Uses ==
=== New Testament ===
The following verses of Psalm 16 are referenced in the New Testament:

- Verses 8-11 are quoted in Acts 2:25–28
- Verse 10b is quoted in Acts 13:35.

In those cases both Peter and Paul applied Psalm 16 to Jesus' resurrection and not to David's life.

=== Judaism ===
Verse 3 is found in Pirkei Avot Chapter 6, no. 10.

Psalm 16 is one of the ten psalms of the Tikkun HaKlali of Rebbe Nachman of Breslov.

=== Coptic Orthodox Church ===
In the Agpeya, the Coptic Church's book of hours, this psalm is prayed in the office of Prime. It is also in the prayer of the Veil, which is generally prayed only by monks.

=== Book of Common Prayer ===
In the Church of England's Book of Common Prayer, Psalm 16 is appointed to be read on the morning of the third day of the month.

== Musical settings ==
Heinrich Schütz wrote a setting of a metric paraphrase of Psalm 16 in German, "Bewahr mich, Gott, ich trau auf dich", SWV 112, for the Becker Psalter, published first in 1628. In 1699, Marc-Antoine Charpentier wrote "Conserva me Domine", H.230, for soloists, chorus, strings, and continuo. The King James Version of verse 10 is used in Handel's oratorio Messiah, HWV 56.
