= Psalm 17 =

Book of psalms chapter 17

- "Hear the right, O LORD, attend unto my cry"
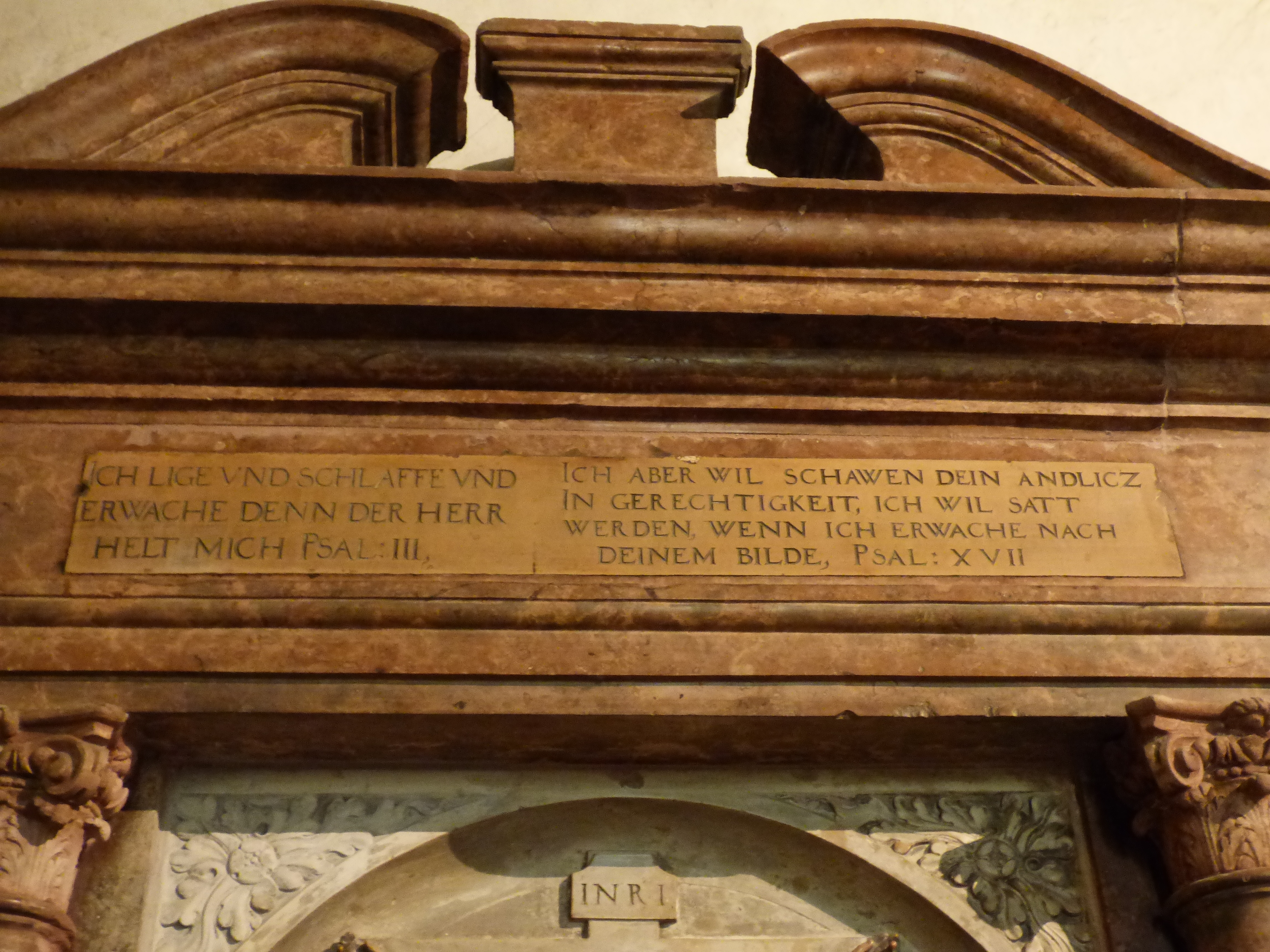
- Verse 15 at the Michaelerkirche in Vienna
- Other name: Psalm 16; Exaudi Domine iustitiam meam
- Language: Hebrew (original)

Psalm 17
- ← Psalm 16 Psalm 18 →
- Book: Book of Psalms
- Hebrew Bible part: Ketuvim
- Order in the Hebrew part: 1
- Category: Sifrei Emet
- Christian Bible part: Old Testament
- Order in the Christian part: 19

Psalm 17 is the 17th psalm of the Book of Psalms, beginning in English in the King James Version: "Hear the right, O LORD, attend unto my cry". In the slightly different numbering of the Greek Septuagint and the Latin Vulgate, this psalm is Psalm 16. In Latin, it is also known by its incipit as "Exaudi Domine iustitiam meam". Its authorship is traditionally assigned to King David.

The psalm forms a regular part of Jewish, Catholic, Lutheran, Anglican liturgies and Protestant psalmody.

== Analysis ==
Charles and Emilie Briggs summarize this psalm as follows: "Psalm 17 is a prayer for divine interposition on behalf of the righteous (v. 1-7). The psalmist has been tested by God in mind and conduct and approved (v. 3-4a); he has kept the divine ways and avoided wicked deeds (v. 4b-5), therefore he invokes God with confidence (v. 6a). He prays again that his Saviour may show kindness and keep him as the pupil of the eye (v. 6b-8a); that he may be sheltered from his greedy and arrogant enemies (v. 8b-10), who surround him to prey upon him (v. 11-12). Again he prays for divine interposition and deliverance by the slaying of the wicked (v. 13-14a); that penalty may be visited on them to the third generation, but that he himself may enjoy the divine presence (v. 14b-15)."

The Briggs believe Psalm 17 to have been written in the Persian period, after Zerubbabel but before Ezra's reforms, possibly by the same author as Psalm 16. Rodd suggests that the context could possibly be a declaration on innocence made before the supreme temple tribunal in accordance with the directive on difficult cases in Deuteronomy 17:8–13.

== Text ==
The following table shows the Hebrew text of the Psalm with vowels, alongside the Koine Greek text in the Septuagint and the English translation from the King James Version. Note that the meaning can slightly differ between these versions, as the Septuagint and the Masoretic Text come from different textual traditions. (Note: A 1917 translation directly from Hebrew to English by the Jewish Publication Society can be found here or here, and an 1844 translation directly from the Septuagint by L. C. L. Brenton can be found here. Both translations are in the public domain.) In the Septuagint, this psalm is numbered Psalm 16.

#	Hebrew	English	Greek
1	תְּפִלָּ֗ה לְדָ֫וִ֥ד שִׁמְעָ֤ה יְהֹוָ֨ה ׀ צֶ֗דֶק הַקְשִׁ֥יבָה רִנָּתִ֗י הַאֲזִ֥ינָה תְפִלָּתִ֑י בְּ֝לֹ֗א שִׂפְתֵ֥י מִרְמָֽה׃	(A Prayer of David.) Hear the right, O LORD, attend unto my cry, give ear unto my prayer, that goeth not out of feigned lips.	Προσευχὴ τοῦ Δαυΐδ. - ΕΙΣΑΚΟΥΣΟΝ, Κύριε, τῆς δικαιοσύνης μου, πρόσχες τῇ δεήσει μου, ἐνώτισαι τὴν προσευχήν μου οὐκ ἐν χείλεσι δολίοις.
2	מִ֭לְּפָנֶיךָ מִשְׁפָּטִ֣י יֵצֵ֑א עֵ֝ינֶ֗יךָ תֶּחֱזֶ֥ינָה מֵישָׁרִֽים׃	Let my sentence come forth from thy presence; let thine eyes behold the things that are equal.	ἐκ προσώπου σου τὸ κρῖμά μου ἐξέλθοι, οἱ ὀφθαλμοί μου ἰδέτωσαν εὐθύτητας.
3	בָּ֘חַ֤נְתָּ לִבִּ֨י ׀ פָּ֘קַ֤דְתָּ לַּ֗יְלָה צְרַפְתַּ֥נִי בַל־תִּמְצָ֑א זַ֝מֹּתִ֗י בַּל־יַעֲבׇר־פִּֽי׃	Thou hast proved mine heart; thou hast visited me in the night; thou hast tried me, and shalt find nothing; I am purposed that my mouth shall not transgress.	ἐδοκίμασας τὴν καρδίαν μου, ἐπεσκέψω νυκτός· ἐπύρωσάς με, καὶ οὐχ εὑρέθη ἐν ἐμοὶ ἀδικία.
4	לִפְעֻלּ֣וֹת אָ֭דָם בִּדְבַ֣ר שְׂפָתֶ֑יךָ אֲנִ֥י שָׁ֝מַ֗רְתִּי אׇרְח֥וֹת פָּרִֽיץ׃	Concerning the works of men, by the word of thy lips I have kept me from the paths of the destroyer.	ὅπως ἂν μὴ λαλήσῃ τὸ στόμα μου τὰ ἔργα τῶν ἀνθρώπων, διὰ τοὺς λόγους τῶν χειλέων σου ἐγὼ ἐφύλαξα ὁδοὺς σκληράς.
5	תָּמֹ֣ךְ אֲ֭שֻׁרַי בְּמַעְגְּלוֹתֶ֑יךָ בַּל־נָמ֥וֹטּוּ פְעָמָֽי׃	Hold up my goings in thy paths, that my footsteps slip not.	κατάρτισαι τὰ διαβήματά μου ἐν ταῖς τρίβοις σου, ἵνα μὴ σαλευθῶσι τὰ διαβήματά μου.
6	אֲנִֽי־קְרָאתִ֣יךָ כִֽי־תַעֲנֵ֣נִי אֵ֑ל הַֽט־אׇזְנְךָ֥ לִ֝֗י שְׁמַ֣ע אִמְרָתִֽי׃	I have called upon thee, for thou wilt hear me, O God: incline thine ear unto me, and hear my speech.	ἐγὼ ἐκέκραξα, ὅτι ἐπήκουσάς μου, ὁ Θεός· κλῖνον τὸ οὖς σου ἐμοὶ καὶ εἰσάκουσον τῶν ῥημάτων μου.
7	הַפְלֵ֣ה חֲ֭סָדֶיךָ מוֹשִׁ֣יעַ חוֹסִ֑ים מִ֝מִּתְקוֹמְמִ֗ים בִּֽימִינֶֽךָ׃	Shew thy marvellous lovingkindness, O thou that savest by thy right hand them which put their trust in thee from those that rise up against them.	θαυμάστωσον τὰ ἐλέη σου, ὁ σῴζων τοὺς ἐλπίζοντας ἐπὶ σὲ ἐκ τῶν ἀνθεστηκότων τῇ δεξιᾷ σου.
8	שׇׁ֭מְרֵנִי כְּאִישׁ֣וֹן בַּת־עָ֑יִן בְּצֵ֥ל כְּ֝נָפֶ֗יךָ תַּסְתִּירֵֽנִי׃	Keep me as the apple of the eye, hide me under the shadow of thy wings,	φύλαξόν με ὡς κόρην ὀφθαλμοῦ· ἐν σκέπῃ τῶν πτερύγων σου σκεπάσεις με
9	מִפְּנֵ֣י רְ֭שָׁעִים ז֣וּ שַׁדּ֑וּנִי אֹיְבַ֥י בְּ֝נֶ֗פֶשׁ יַקִּ֥יפוּ עָלָֽי׃	From the wicked that oppress me, from my deadly enemies, who compass me about.	ἀπὸ προσώπου ἀσεβῶν τῶν ταλαιπωρησάντων με. οἱ ἐχθροί μου τὴν ψυχήν μου περιέσχον·
10	חֶלְבָּ֥מוֹ סָּגְר֑וּ פִּ֝֗ימוֹ דִּבְּר֥וּ בְגֵאֽוּת׃	They are inclosed in their own fat: with their mouth they speak proudly.	τὸ στέαρ αὐτῶν συνέκλεισαν, τὸ στόμα αὐτῶν ἐλάλησεν ὑπερηφανίαν.
11	אַ֭שֻּׁרֵינוּ עַתָּ֣ה (סבבוני) [סְבָב֑וּנוּ] עֵינֵיהֶ֥ם יָ֝שִׁ֗יתוּ לִנְט֥וֹת בָּאָֽרֶץ׃	They have now compassed us in our steps: they have set their eyes bowing down to the earth;	ἐκβαλόντες με νυνὶ περιεκύκλωσάν με, τοὺς ὀφθαλμοὺς αὐτῶν ἔθεντο ἐκκλῖναι ἐν τῇ γῇ.
12	דִּמְיֹנ֗וֹ כְּ֭אַרְיֵה יִכְס֣וֹף לִטְרֹ֑ף וְ֝כִכְפִ֗יר יֹשֵׁ֥ב בְּמִסְתָּרִֽים׃	Like as a lion that is greedy of his prey, and as it were a young lion lurking in secret places.	ὑπέλαβόν με ὡσεὶ λέων ἕτοιμος εἰς θήραν καὶ ὡσεὶ σκύμνος οἰκῶν ἐν ἀποκρύφοις.
13	קוּמָ֤ה יְהֹוָ֗ה קַדְּמָ֣ה פָ֭נָיו הַכְרִיעֵ֑הוּ פַּלְּטָ֥ה נַ֝פְשִׁ֗י מֵרָשָׁ֥ע חַרְבֶּֽךָ׃	Arise, O LORD, disappoint him, cast him down: deliver my soul from the wicked, which is thy sword:	ἀνάστηθι, Κύριε, πρόφθασον αὐτοὺς καὶ ὑποσκέλισον αὐτούς, ῥῦσαι τὴν ψυχήν μου ἀπὸ ἀσεβοῦς, ρομφαίαν σου ἀπὸ ἐχθρῶν τῆς χειρός σου.
14	מִ֥מְתִֽים־יָדְךָ֨ ׀ יְהֹוָ֡ה מִֽמְתִ֬ים מֵחֶ֗לֶד חֶלְקָ֥ם בַּֽחַיִּים֮ (וצפינך) [וּֽצְפוּנְךָ֮] תְּמַלֵּ֢א בִ֫טְנָ֥ם יִשְׂבְּע֥וּ בָנִ֑ים וְהִנִּ֥יחוּ יִ֝ת תְרָ֗ם לְעוֹלְלֵיהֶֽם׃	From men which are thy hand, O LORD, from men of the world, which have their portion in this life, and whose belly thou fillest with thy hid treasure: they are full of children, and leave the rest of their substance to their babes.	Κύριε, ἀπὸ ὀλίγων ἀπὸ γῆς διαμέρισον αὐτοὺς ἐν τῇ ζωῇ αὐτῶν, καὶ τῶν κεκρυμμένων σου ἐπλήσθη ἡ γαστὴρ αὐτῶν, ἐχορτάσθησαν υἱῶν, καὶ ἀφῆκαν τὰ κατάλοιπα τοῖς νηπίοις αὐτῶν.
15	אֲנִ֗י בְּ֭צֶדֶק אֶחֱזֶ֣ה פָנֶ֑יךָ אֶשְׂבְּעָ֥ה בְ֝הָקִ֗יץ תְּמוּנָתֶֽךָ׃	As for me, I will behold thy face in righteousness: I shall be satisfied, when I awake, with thy likeness.	ἐγὼ δὲ ἐν δικαιοσύνῃ ὀφθήσομαι τῷ προσώπῳ σου, χορτασθήσομαι ἐν τῷ ὀφθῆναί μοι τὴν δόξαν σου.

Commentator C. S. Rodd notes that the text is uncertain in a number of places, making the exact meaning doubtful, for example in verses 3, 4 and 14.

== Uses ==
=== Judaism ===
- Verse 2 is found in the repetition of the Amidah during Rosh Hashanah.
- Verse 8 is part of the prayers of the Bedtime Shema.

=== Christianity ===
- Verse 8, Keep me as the apple of the eye, hide me under the shadow of thy wings, is used in the office of Compline.
- In the Church of England's Book of Common Prayer, Psalm 17 is appointed to be read on the morning of the third day of the month.
- Psalm 16 is included in the Third Hour service in the Eastern Orthodox Church.

== Musical settings ==
Heinrich Schütz set Psalm 17 in a metred version in German, "Herr Gott, erhör die Grechtigkeit", SWV 113, as part of the Becker Psalter. Willy Burkhard composed in 1937 a setting for unison voices and organ, as his opus 49.The Irish hymn "mo ghrá Thu" is based on Psalm 17 [11]

== Sources ==
- Coogan, Michael David (2007). Coogan, Michael David; Brettler, Marc Zvi; Newsom, Carol Ann; Perkins, Pheme (eds.). The New Oxford Annotated Bible with the Apocryphal/Deuterocanonical Books: New Revised Standard Version, Issue 48 (Augmented 3rd ed.). Oxford University Press. ISBN 9780195288810.
