= Ein Keloheinu =

Jewish hymn

Ein Keloheinu (Hebrew: אֵין כֵּאלֹהֵינוּ, lit. 'there is none like our God') is a well-known hymn used in Jewish religious services. (Note: Orthodox Jews pronounce it as Ein Kelokeinu when used in contexts other than formal prayer to avoid unnecessarily using a name of God or diminishing the reverence due to God.) Ein Keloheinu is sometimes chanted at the end of the Jewish morning service (i.e., Shacharit). In Ashkenazi tradition in the Jewish diaspora, it is recited at the end of Shabbat and Jewish holidays services, just before a Talmudic lesson on Temple incense. However, in the vast majority of Ashkenazic communities in the Land of Israel, as well as in all Sephardic and Hasidic weekday morning prayer services, it is said daily. In some other regional traditions, it is used elsewhere in the liturgy, but it seems to be known worldwide. In many synagogues it is sung; in some Orthodox synagogues it is only said quietly by every person for themselves and is not regarded as a critical part of the prayer service.

One explanation for the prayer is that its 20 sentences each count as a blessing. Jews are exhorted to make at least 100 blessings daily. On weekdays, the Shemoneh Esrei (or Amidah) prayer contains 19 blessings and is said three times, totaling 57 blessings, and the remaining 43 are said during other parts of daily services as well as during other events throughout the day. On Shabbat and festivals, however, the Amidah consists of only seven blessings. Ein Keloheinu was designed to ensure that everybody would say at least 100 blessings a day, even on those days when the Amidah is shorter.

Four different names are used to refer to God in this prayer:

1. Elohim (אלהים) – God
2. Adon (אדון) – Lord or Master
3. Melekh (מלך) – King
4. Moshia` (מושיע) – Savior

These names of God are in the same sequence in which they appear in the Torah. The kabbalists saw, in the use of four names for God, references to four different Divine qualities.

== Text ==
=== The original version ===
Hebrew original
Transliteration
English translation

אין כאלהינו, אין כאדונינו
אין כמלכנו, אין כמושיענו.
מי כאלהינו, מי כאדונינו,
מי כמלכנו, מי כמושיענו.
נודה לאלהינו, נודה לאדונינו,
נודה למלכנו, נודה למושיענו.
ברוך אלהינו, ברוך אדונינו,
ברוך מלכנו, ברוך מושיענו.
אתה הוא אלהינו, אתה הוא אדונינו,
אתה הוא מלכנו,
אתה הוא מושיענו.

Ein kelohenu, ein kadonenu,
ein kemalkenu, ein kemoshi'enu.
Mi chelohenu, mi chadonenu,
mi chemalkenu, mi chemoshi'enu.
Node lelohenu, node ladonenu,
node lemalkenu, node lemoshi'enu,
Baruch Elohenu, baruch Adonenu,
baruch Malkenu, baruch Moshi'enu.
Atah hu Elohenu, atah hu Adonenu,
atah hu Malkenu,
atah hu Moshi'enu.

There is none like our God, There is none like our Lord,
There is none like our King, There is none like our Savior.
Who is like our God? Who is like our Lord?
Who is like our King? Who is like our Savior?
Let us thank our God, Let us thank our Lord,
Let us thank our King, Let us thank our Savior.
Blessed be our God, Blessed be our Lord,
Blessed be our King, Blessed be our Savior.
You are our God, You are our Lord,
You are our King,
You are our Savior.

° אתה הוא שהקטירו אבותינו לפניך
את קטרת הסמים.
°° אתה תושיענו.
אתה תקום תרחם ציון,
כי עת לחננה כי בא מועד.

° Atah hu shehiqtiru abotenu, lefanecha,
eth qetoreth hasamim.
°° Ata toshi'enu.
Ata taqum terachem tziyon, ki
'et lechen'nah, ki ba mo'ed.

° You are the one before whom
our fathers burned the incense of spice.
°° You will save us.
You will arise and show mercy to Zion, for it will
be the time to favor her, for the proper time
will have arrived.

The Hebrew text is as it appears in all siddurim, both Ashkenazic and Sephardic.
° The last line of the piyut itself is "You are our Savior."
The Ashkenazic liturgy follows this immediately (as part of the chanting) with "You are the one before whom ...." followed by a Talmudic description of the mixing of the incense spices for the Temple. This text is typically omitted in Reform liturgy.
°° The Sephard, and the Sephardic/Mizrahi liturgies follow the last line of the piyut with the words, "You will save us," followed by the quotation of Psalm 102:14, "You will arise ...."

Among Ashkenazim, the additional line and the Talmudic lesson on the making of incense which follows it is considered optional and so that line and lesson might be omitted.

This prayer appears in the liturgy as early as the Siddur Rav Amram (ca 875) – where the first verse is "Who is like ..." and the second verse is "There is none like ...", but the present sequence appears in the Mahzor Vitry and in Rashi (both late 11th century) and a century later in Maimonides. The present sequence is viewed as, first, a declaration against all other religions, then a challenge to all other religions, and thereafter as worship. Additionally, Abudraham (ca. 1340) pointed that the initial "א" from the first verse, the "מ" from the second, and the "נ" from the third formed Amen, and taking the Barukh from the fourth verse and the Atah from the final verse, together produce "Amen. Blessed are Thou" – as if the end of one prayer and the beginning of another, and this serves as a suitable mnemonic to keep the verses in proper sequence.

== Ladino version ==
In many Sephardic congregations, Ein Keiloheinu is often sung in Ladino (also known as Judaeo-Spanish) or alternating Hebrew and Ladino, but it retains its Hebrew name.

=== Ladino lyrics ===
Ladino lyrics

נון קומו מואישטרו דיו, נון קומו מואישטרו שינייור,
נון קומו מואישטרו ריאי, נון קומו מואישטרו שלבֿדור.
קיין קומו מואישטרו דיו, קיין קומו מואישטרו שינייור,
קיין קומו מואישטרו ריאי, קיין קומו מואישטרו שלבֿדור.
לוארימוס אה מואישטרו דיו, לוארימוס אה מואישטרו שינייור,
לוארימוס אה מואישטרו ריאי, לוארימוס אה מואישטרו שלבֿדור.
בנדיגֿו מואישטרו דיו, בנדיגֿו מואישטרו שינייור,
בנדיגֿו מואישטרו ריאי, בנדיגֿו מואישטרו שלבֿדור.
טו סוס מואישטרו דיו, טו סוס מואישטרו שינייור,
טו סוס מואישטרו ריאי, טו סוס מואישטרו שלבֿדור.

Latin-script transcription

Non komo muestro Dyo, non komo muestro Senyor,
Non komo muestro Rey, non komo muestro Salvador.
Kien komo muestro Dyo, kien komo muestro Senyor,
Kien komo muestro Rey, kien komo muestro Salvador.
Loaremos a muestro Dyo, Loaremos a muestro Senyor,
Loaremos a muestro Rey, Loaremos a muestro Salvador.
Bendicho muestro Dyo, Bendicho muestro Senyor,
Bendicho muestro Rey, Bendicho muestro Salvador.
Tu sos muestro Dyo, Tu sos muestro Senyor.
Tu sos muestro Rey, Tu sos muestro Salvador.

== Yiddish version ==
In some Germanic congregations, Ein Keiloheinu is sometimes sung, alternating Yiddish (also known as Judaeo-German) and Hebrew.

=== Yiddish lyrics ===
Yiddish lyrics

עס גיבט קײַן גאָט וויא אונזער גאָט - אֵין כֵּאלֹהֵינוּ, עס גיבט קײַן הער וויא אונזער הער - אֵין כַּאדוֹנֵינוּ,
עס גיבט קײַן קעניג וויא אונזער קעניג - אֵין כְּמַלְכֵּינוּ, עס גיבט קײַן העלפֿער וויא אונזער העלפֿער - אֵין כְּמוֹשִׁיעֵנוּ.
ווער איזט דער גאָט וויא אונזער גאָט - מִי כֵאלֹהֵינוּ, ווער איזט דער הער וויא אונזער הער - מִי כַאדוֹנֵינוּ,
ווער איזט דער קעניג וויא אונזער קעניג - מִי כְמַלְכֵּינוּ, ווער איזט דער העלפֿער וויא אונזער העלפֿער - מִי כְמוֹשִׁיעֵינוּ.
וויר דאַנקען דען גאָט אונזער גאָט - נוֹדֶה לֵאלֹהֵינוּ, וויר דאַנקען דען הער אונזער הער - נוֹדֶה לַאדוֹנֵינוּ,
וויר דאַנקען דען קעניג אונזער קעניג - נוֹדֶה לְמַלְכֵּינוּ, וויר דאַנקען דען העלפֿער אונזער העלפֿער - נוֹדֶה לְמוֹשִׁיעֵינוּ.
געלאָבט איזט דער גאָט אונזער גאָט - בָּרוּךְ אֱלֹהֵינוּ, געלאָבט איזט דער הער אונזער הער - בָּרוּךְ אֲדוֹנֵינוּ,
געלאָבט איזט דער קעניג אונזער קעניג - בָּרוּךְ מַלְכֵּינוּ, געלאָבט איזט דער העלפֿער אונזער העלפֿער - בָּרוּךְ אֲדוֹנֵינוּ.
דו ביזט דער גאָט אונזער גאָט - אַתָּה הוּא אֱלֹהֵינוּ, דו ביזט דער הער אונזער הער - אַתָּה הוּא אֲדוֹנֵינוּ
דו ביזט דער קעניג אונזער קעניג - אַתָּה הוּא מַלְכֵּינוּ, דו ביזט דער העלפֿער אונזער העלפֿער - אַתָּה הוּא מוֹשִיעֵינוּ.

Latin-script transcription

Es gibt kayn Got vi unzer Got - ein Keiloheinu, es gibt kayn Her vi unzer Her - ein Kadoneinu,
Es gibt kayn Kenig vi unzer Kenig - ein Kemalkeinu, es gibt kayn Helfer vi unzer Helfer - ein Kemoshi'einu.
Ver izt der Got vi unzer Got - mi Cheiloheinu, ver izt der Her vi unzer Her - mi Chadoneinu,
Ver izt der Kenig vi unzer Kenig - mi Chemalkeinu, ver izt der Helfer vi unzer Helfer - mi Chemoshi'einu.
Vir danken den Got unzer Got - nodeh Leiloheinu, vir danken den Her unzer Her - nodeh Ladoneinu,
Vir danken den Kenig unzer Kenig - nodeh Lemalkeinu, vir danken den Helfer unzer Helfer - nodeh Lemoshi'einu.
Gelobt izt der Got unzer Got - boruch Elokeinu, gelobt izt der Her unzer Her - boruch Adoneinu,
Gelobt izt der Kenig unzer Kenig - boruch Malkeinu, gelobt izt der Helfer unzer Helfer - boruch Moshi'einu.
Du bizt der Got unzer Got - Ato Hu Eloheinu, Du bizt der Her unzer Her - Ato Hu Adoneinu,
Du bizt der Kenig unzer Kenig - Ato Hu Malkeinu, Du bizt der Helfer unzer Helfer - Ato Hu Moshi'einu.

== In popular culture ==
Philadelphia based post-hardcore band mewithoutYou incorporated words from the Ein Keloheinu hymn into the song "Four Fires," a B-side track from their fifth full-length studio album, Ten Stories.

== See also ==
- Jewish services
- List of Jewish prayers and blessings
- Names of God in Judaism
