= 2 Samuel 22 =

Second Book of Samuel chapter

- ← chapter 21 chapter 23 →
- The complete Hebrew text of the Books of Samuel (1 and 2 Samuel) in the Leningrad Codex (1008)
- Book: Books of Samuel
- Hebrew Bible part: Nevi'im
- Order in the Hebrew part: 3
- Category: Former Prophets
- Christian Bible part: Old Testament
- Order in the Christian part: 10

2 Samuel 22 is the twenty-second chapter in the second parts of the Books of Samuel in the Hebrew Bible (or the 22nd chapter of the "Second Book of Samuel" in the Old Testament of the Christian Bible). According to Jewish tradition the book was attributed to the prophet Samuel, with additions by the prophets Gad and Nathan, but modern scholars view it as a composition of a number of independent texts of various ages from c. 630–540 BCE. This chapter contains a Song of Thanksgiving attributed to King David which corresponds to Psalm 18. It is within a section comprising 2 Samuel 21–24 containing the appendices to the Books of Samuel.

== Text ==
The original text of this chapter was written in the Hebrew language. This chapter is divided into 51 verses.

=== Textual versions ===
Some ancient witnesses for the text of this chapter in Hebrew are of the Masoretic Text, which includes the Codex Cairensis (895), Aleppo Codex (10th century), Codex Leningradensis (1008). Fragments containing parts of this chapter in Hebrew were found among the Dead Sea Scrolls including 4Q51 (4QSam^{a}; 100–50 BCE) with extant verses 17, 19, 21, 24, 26–28, 30–31, 33–51.

There is also a translation into Koine Greek known as the Septuagint, made in the last few centuries BC. Extant ancient manuscripts of the Septuagint version include Codex Vaticanus (B; $\mathfrak{G}$^{B}; 4th century) and Codex Alexandrinus (A; $\mathfrak{G}$^{A}; 5th century). (Note: The whole book of 1 Samuel is missing from the extant Codex Sinaiticus.)

== Analysis ==
The song celebrates King David's achievements as God's marvellous works, which is very similar to Psalm 18, with only minor differences, attributed to possible scribal errors or to the transmission process. According to Charles and Emilie Briggs in the International Critical Commentary series, Psalm 18 borrowed material from 2 Samuel 22, which may have been written by David himself, with later additions in the psalm by multiple editors adapting it for use in public worship. The Pulpit Commentary suggests that "the introduction – David spoke to the Lord the words of this song on the day when the Lord delivered him from the hand of all his enemies, and from the hand of Saul – "was probably written by the prophet who compiled the Books of Samuel. The scribe who collected the Book of Psalms would be a priest, and he has repeated it with one or two additions". It is generally recognized that the language of the poem is archaic, with earlier attempts to date it to the Macabean period (second century BCE) 'have been abandoned in favor of the tenth century BCE'. The analysis finds two ancient poems from the monarchic period: (1) verse 2–20 and (2) verses 29–31, 35–51), which were linked with the addition of verses 21–28, verse 1 and verse 51a. The combined songs celebrates two aspects in the life of David: the deliverance from his enemies and his military conquests.

This chapter has the following structure:

The incipit: God delivered David (22:1)

A. Introduction: David invokes God, his savior (22:2–4)

B. David recalls that God heard his cry (22:5–7)

C. Weather theophanies: God won David's battles (22:8–16)

D. David sings of his deliverance by God (22:17–20)

E. David's legacy: his righteousness (22:21–25)
E'. God delivers all the righteous (22:26–28)

D'. David sings of the victories God gave him (22:29–31)

C'. David was victorious with God's help (22:32–43)

B'. What God did for David (22:44–46)

A. Conclusion: David praises God for his steadfast love (22:47–51)

The inclusion to this song or "psalm" (A/A' sections) is marked by the appellation for God such as "my rock" (22:3 and 22:47). The next bracket, B/B' sections, balances David's plea with God's response: David called out (22:7) and God rescued (22:44). The C/C' sections contain divine theophanies (22:11: "he was seen upon the wings of the wind") and what David accomplished with that divine support (22:38: "I pursued my enemies and I destroyed them"). The D/D' sections parallel how God rescued David (22:18: "He delivered me from my strong enemy") with how God prepared David as his warrior (22:35: "he trains my hands for war"). The center of this song (E/E sections) contains the main themes that define David for future generations.

== Incipit (22:1) ==
Then David spoke to the Lord the words of this song, on the day when the Lord had delivered him from the hand of all his enemies, and from the hand of Saul.

This verse contains the song title which generally relates to the protection of David from Saul and his enemies, not focusing on any particular event.

== Verses 2–20 ==
The prominent theme of first poem, comprising verses 2–20, is the rescue of David from his enemies, with the help of God, in the imagery of a rock as a place of refuge (verses 2–4), and as a theophany (verses 8–20) that God responded to his cry of help (verse 7) when he was in distress at the hands of the enemies (verses 5–6).

== Verses 21–28 ==
The transitional verses 21–28 contain traces of Deuteronomistic language, the most obvious clichés being: 'the ways of the LORD' (cf. Deuteronomy 8:6; 10:11, etc.), 'judgements and statutes' (Deuteronomy 4:5; 5:1, etc.). Verses 21–25 proclaim David's innocence, pointing (according to biblical commentator Alexander Kirkpatrick) "to the earlier years of David's reign rather than the later, overclouded as these were by the fatal consequences of his sin" (his adultery with Bathsheba), with its fateful consequences which hung over David for the remainder of his life. Kirkpatrick associates this song with the period of peace described in 2 Samuel 7:1, but after the visit of Nathan when he proclaims God's covenant with David "and his descendants for ever". Verses 26-27 assert again the theme of 'Yahweh's help to the blameless and pure' in a fourfold statement, which 'have been described as an ancient quatrain'

== Verses 29–51 ==
The second poetic section (verses 29–51) focuses more on 'David's victories over his enemies', so this part has been called a 'royal victory song'. The mention of David and his descendants only in the last phrase of the song is a 'feature paralleled in other victory songs', so it is to be regarded not as an addition, but as original.

=== Verse 50 ===
Therefore I will give thanks to You, O Lord, among the Gentiles,
And sing praises to Your name.

- Cited in Romans 15:9

=== Verse 51 ===
"He is the tower of salvation to His king,
And shows mercy to His anointed,
To David and his descendants forevermore."

- "Tower": from Biblical Hebrew: מגדיל; written: migdil; read: migdol.
- "Mercy" (Hebrew: חסד; khesed): "steadfast love" (NRSV) or "loyalty".
- "Anointed" (from Hebrew word: מָשִׁיחַ; mashiach): "Messiah".
- "His descendants": supporting a forward-looking statement that God would also keep the covenant with David's descendants.

== See also ==
- Cherub
- Heaven
- Hell
- Messiah
- Most High
- Paganism
- Praise
- Psalms
- Righteousness
- Related Bible parts: Exodus 15, 1 Samuel 23, 1 Samuel 24, 25, 1 Samuel 26, 1 Samuel 27, Psalm 18, Habakkuk 3.

== Sources ==
- Coogan, Michael David (2007). Coogan, Michael David; Brettler, Marc Zvi; Newsom, Carol Ann; Perkins, Pheme (eds.). The New Oxford Annotated Bible with the Apocryphal/Deuterocanonical Books: New Revised Standard Version, Issue 48 (Augmented 3rd ed.). Oxford University Press. ISBN 978-0195288810.
- Fitzmyer, Joseph A. (2008). A Guide to the Dead Sea Scrolls and Related Literature. Grand Rapids, MI: William B. Eerdmans Publishing Company. ISBN 9780802862419.
- Jones, Gwilym H. (2007). "12. 1 and 2 Samuel". In Barton, John; Muddiman, John (eds.). The Oxford Bible Commentary (first (paperback) ed.). Oxford University Press. pp. 196–232. ISBN 978-0199277186.
- Knight, Douglas A (1995). "Chapter 4 Deuteronomy and the Deuteronomists". In James Luther Mays, David L. Petersen and Kent Harold Richards (ed.). Old Testament Interpretation. T&T Clark. ISBN 9780567292896.
- Morrison, Craig E. (2013). Berit Olam: 2 Samuel. Liturgical Press. ISBN 978-0814682913.
- Payne, D. F. (1994). "1 and 2 Samuel". In Carson, D. A.; France, R. T.; Motyer, J. A.; Wenham, G. J. (eds.). New Bible Commentary: 21st Century Edition (4, illustrated, reprint, revised ed.). Inter-Varsity Press. pp. 296–333. ISBN 9780851106489.
- Ulrich, Eugene, ed. (2010). The Biblical Qumran Scrolls: Transcriptions and Textual Variants. Brill.
- Würthwein, Ernst (1995). The Text of the Old Testament. Translated by Rhodes, Erroll F. Grand Rapids, MI: Wm. B. Eerdmans. ISBN 0-8028-0788-7.
