= Matthew 22 =

- ← chapter 21 chapter 23 →
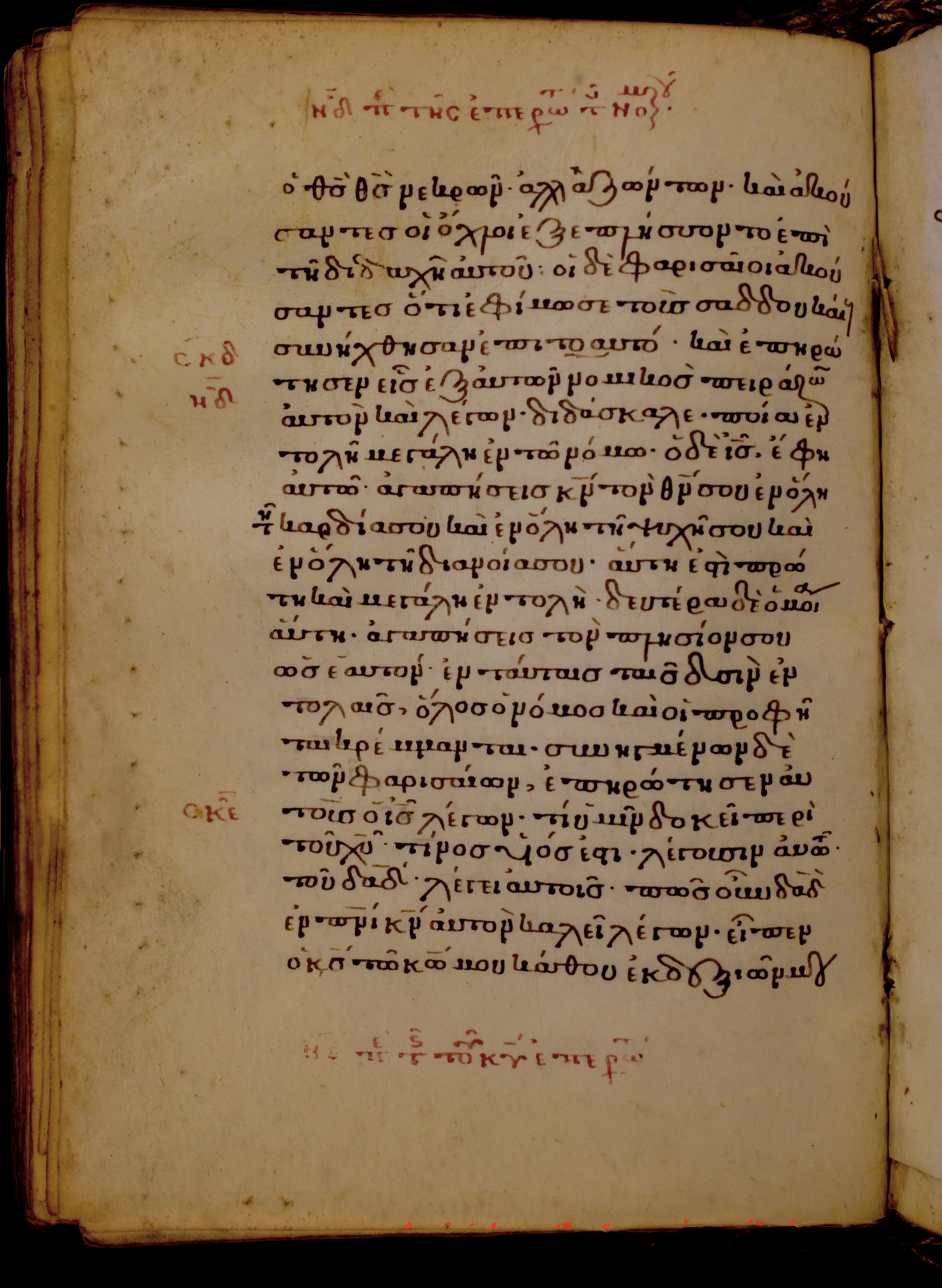
- Gospel of Matthew 22:32–44 on Minuscule 544, from 13th century
- Book: Gospel of Matthew
- Category: Gospel
- Christian Bible part: New Testament
- Order in the Christian part: 1

Matthew 22 is the twenty-second chapter in the Gospel of Matthew in the New Testament section of the Christian Bible. Jesus continues his final ministry in Jerusalem before his Passion. Teaching in the Temple, Jesus enters into debate successively with the Pharisees, allied with the Herodians, the Sadducees, and a lawyer, ultimately silencing them all.

== Text ==
The original text was written in Koine Greek. This chapter is divided into 46 verses.

The narrative can be divided into the following subsections:

- Parable of the Great Banquet (22:1–14)
- Render unto Caesar... (22:15–22)
- Marriage at the Resurrection (22:23–33)
- Great Commandment (22:34–40)
- "Is the Messiah the son of David?" (22:41–46)

=== Textual witnesses ===
Some early manuscripts containing the text of this chapter are:

- Codex Vaticanus (AD 325–350)
- Codex Sinaiticus (330–360)
- Codex Bezae (c. 400)
- Codex Washingtonianus (c. 400)
- Codex Ephraemi Rescriptus (c. 450)
- Codex Purpureus Rossanensis (6th century)
- Codex Sinopensis (6th century; extant verses 1–7, 13–14, 32–34)

=== Old Testament references ===
- Matthew 22:32: Exodus 3:6
- Matthew 22:37: Deuteronomy 6:5
- Matthew 22:39: Leviticus 19:18
- Matthew 22:44: Psalm 110:1

== The wedding feast (22:1–14) ==
Dale Allison notes that the passage consists of an introduction (verse 1), the parable itself (verses 2–13b) and a commentary (verses 13c and 14: there will be weeping and gnashing of teeth, for many are called, but few are chosen). Protestant biblical commentator Heinrich Meyer creates a similar break in verse 13, with the final words of the king in the story being "take him away, and cast him into outer darkness" and Jesus adding the remark there will be weeping and gnashing of teeth. Although the topic concerns a wedding feast, the dominant idea here concerns the guests who have been invited to attend.

R. T. France suggests that the theological theme of replacement is very strong in this parable, when those who had been invited but refused the repeated invitations, and even murdered the messengers, were substituted by the new people from unlikely groups, from the street corners, including both good and bad, as the guests.

=== Verse 1 ===
And Jesus answered and spoke to them again by parables and said:

Meyer suggests that Jesus' reply, "by way of rejoinder", was his answer to the chief priests' and scribes' desire to arrest him in the previous verse (Matthew 21:46). A number of modern English translations lack wording corresponding to the Greek: Καὶ ἀποκριθεὶς, kai apokritheis: for example, the Jerusalem Bible reads: Jesus began to speak to them in parables once again and the New International Version reads Jesus spoke to them again in parables, saying: ... The Revised Geneva Translation (2019) maintains the wording Then Jesus answered, and spoke to them again in parables, saying...

=== Verse 5 ===
But they made light of it and went their ways, one to his own farm, another to his business.

Those invited to the wedding feast declined to attend. Meyer suggests that those who left "having paid no attention" formed the majority, while "the rest", in verse 6, formed a smaller "remainder" of the invitees.

=== Verse 13 ===
Then the king said to the servants, 'Bind him hand and foot, [take him away, and] cast him into outer darkness; there will be weeping and gnashing of teeth'.

The words "take him away, and" (ἄρατε αὐτὸν καὶ) are missing from the critical Novum Testamentum Graece. Meyer argues that "the word ἄρατε, not being needed to complete the picture, was struck out. The reading of the Received text [which includes these words] ought to be maintained".

== Roman taxation (22:15–22) ==
A trap was laid for Jesus by the Pharisees and the Herodians concerning the Roman poll-tax, which was fiercely opposed by patriotic Jews, but Jesus exposed those who asked the question as hypocrites. France notes that they carried the denarius: the coin bears Caesar's idolatrous portrait with the inscription "Son of God".

=== Verse 19 ===
[Jesus said,] "Show Me the tax money".
So they brought Him a denarius.

The "tax money" was τὸ νόμισμα τοῦ κήνσου (to nomisma tou kēnsou), associated with the Roman census (Luke 2:1–5, Acts 5:37).

== The Resurrection (22:23–33) ==
The Sadducees held no belief in afterlife, because they maintained that it was not taught in any of Moses' five books, the only authoritative Scriptures they accepted. Jesus pointed out that the basis of the belief in resurrection can be found within the books of Moses, specifically citing Exodus 3:6.

== The Greatest Commandment (22:34–40) ==
A question is asked by a lawyer, one of the Pharisees:

Teacher, which is the great commandment in the law?

France describes the combination of Deuteronomy 6:5 and Leviticus 19:18 as a brilliantly creative idea, as it brings the focus on the two halves of the Ten Commandments as a foundation of life, and sums up that duty as love, that is, a God-like attitude beyond the specific requirements of the Law. The Jerusalem Bible suggests that the reference to a lawyer is not original but borrowed from Luke 10:25, There was a lawyer who, to disconcert [Jesus] ...

== 'Son of David?' (22:41–46) ==
While the Pharisees were gathered together, Jesus asked them,

Jesus now asks a question of the Pharisees. Johann Bengel suggests that this was not merely the Pharisees gathering together as a group, but gathering "solemnly", having assembled in verse 34 as a result of them hearing that the Sadducees had been "put to silence".

In his answer, France suggests that Jesus was warning the people against judging his ministry in traditional terms, because far from being enthroned in Jerusalem as a king like David, he would soon be put to death on the cross, where he would be known at last not as a Son of David (a title that ceases to exist), but as 'Son of God' (Matthew 27:54). Similarly, Wilhelm de Wette suggests that Jesus' object was "to awaken a higher idea of His (non-political) mission", but according to Meyer, in opposition to de Wette, this view "is not favoured by the context, which represents Jesus as victor over His impudent and crafty foes, who are silenced and then subjected to the castigation" which is described next, in chapter 23.

=== Verse 46 ===
And no one was able to answer Him a word, nor from that day on did anyone dare question Him anymore.

This verse ends the "Son of David" dialogue; the Jerusalem Bible states that no-one in the gathering "could think of anything to say in reply". It also closes off the whole narrative from Matthew 21:23 onwards, where Jesus has been addressed with "question after question".

== See also ==
- David
- Parables of Jesus
- Other related Bible parts: Exodus 3, Joshua 10, Psalm 110, Mark 12, Luke 10, Luke 14, Luke 20; Acts 2, 5; Romans 8; Hebrews 1, 5, 6, 7, 10, 12

== Sources ==
- Coogan, Michael David (2007). Coogan, Michael David; Brettler, Marc Zvi; Newsom, Carol Ann; Perkins, Pheme (eds.). The New Oxford Annotated Bible with the Apocryphal/Deuterocanonical Books: New Revised Standard Version, Issue 48 (Augmented 3rd ed.). Oxford University Press. ISBN 9780195288810.
- France, R. T. (1994). "Matthew". In Carson, D. A.; France, R. T.; Motyer, J. A.; Wenham, G. J. (eds.). New Bible Commentary: 21st Century Edition (4, illustrated, reprint, revised ed.). Inter-Varsity Press. pp. 904–945. ISBN 9780851106489.
