= Luke 20 =

- ← chapter 19 chapter 21 →
- Facsimile from 1861 of Luke 20:9 in Codex Cyprius (9th–10th century)
- Book: Gospel of Luke
- Category: Gospel
- Christian Bible part: New Testament
- Order in the Christian part: 3

Luke 20 is the twentieth chapter of the Gospel of Luke in the New Testament of the Christian Bible. It records the teaching of Jesus Christ in the temple in Jerusalem, especially his responses to questions raised by the Pharisees and Sadducees. Early Christian tradition uniformly affirmed that Luke the Evangelist composed this Gospel as well as the Acts of the Apostles. Critical opinion on the tradition was evenly divided at the end of the 20th century.

== Text ==
The original text was written in Koine Greek. This chapter is divided into 47 verses. Some early manuscripts containing the text of this chapter are:

- Papyrus 75 (written about AD 175–225)
- Codex Vaticanus (325–350)
- Codex Sinaiticus (330–360)
- Codex Bezae (c. 400)
- Codex Washingtonianus (c. 400)
- Codex Alexandrinus (400–440)
- Codex Ephraemi Rescriptus (c. 450; extant verses 1–27).

=== Old Testament references ===
- Luke 20:17: Psalm 118:22
- Luke 20:27–33: Deuteronomy 25:5–6: the Levirate law
- Luke 20:37: Exodus 3:6,15: the passage about the burning bush
- Luke 20:42,43: Psalm 110:1.

== Jesus' authority questioned (verses 1–8) ==
Luke follows Mark 11:27–33 with some abbreviation, and with some material peculiar to himself.

One day, as he was teaching the people in the temple and telling the good news, the chief priests and the scribes came with the elders ...

The New King James Version reads "on one of those days", reflecting the additional word εκεινων (ekeinōn), inserted into the Textus Receptus. This word, added "for greater precision", is missing "from the authorities of greatest importance, condemned by Johann Jakob Griesbach, and deleted by Karl Lachmann and Constantin von Tischendorf".

Luke presents Jesus continuing to teach 'the people' in the Temple, who are "presented as favourably disposed to him", but when the chief priests, scribes and elders question him about his authority, Jesus raises a question in return about the origin of John's baptism.

=== Verses 5-6 ===
And they discussed it with one another, saying, "If we say, 'From heaven', he will say, 'Why did you not believe him?' ^{6} But if we say, 'From man', all the people will stone us to death, for they are convinced that John was a prophet."

In the popular mind, John was a prophet, but the temple leaders had "refused to believe him" (verse 5). In Luke 7:30, the Pharisees and the lawyers had declined John's baptism. Matthew and Mark both refer generally to the leaders' fear of the people, but do not suggest that the people would stone their leaders. William Robertson Nicoll argues that the suggestion that they would actually carry this out should be taken "cum grano" ("with a pinch of salt").

So those who have questioned Jesus decline to answer, stating that they "did not know where it came from". F. W. Farrar notes that there is a Hebrew proverb, Learn to say I do not know, which it is wise to use in a case of "real uncertainty", but wrong when, as in this case, they did hold an opinion on the matter and "it was their plain duty [in this case] to have arrived at a judgment".

== Parable of the Wicked Vinedressers (verses 9–19) ==
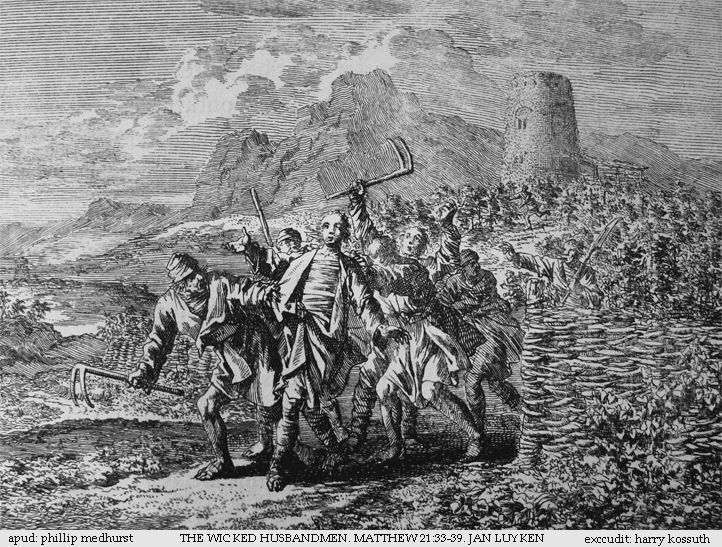
The Wicked Husbandmen, from the Bowyer Bible, 19th century

This parable of Jesus, also known as the Parable of the Wicked Husbandmen, is found in three of the four canonical gospels (Luke 20:9–19, Mark 12:1–12, and Matthew 21:33–46), and also in the non-canonical Gospel of Thomas. For Rudolf Bultmann, the passage is not a "parable" but an "allegory", and "intelligible only on that basis". It describes a householder planting a vineyard and letting it out to husbandmen, who failed in their duty. The owner sent various servants successively to collect a share of the proceeds of the harvest, but each time the husbandmen rejected them. Unlike the texts in Matthew and Mark, Luke states that "perhaps" (Greek: ἴσως, isōs, "probably" in the NKJV and in Marvin Vincent's interpretation) they will respect the owner's son. The word ἴσως is not used elsewhere in the New Testament. It appears once in the Septuagint version of the Hebrew Bible, at 1 Samuel 25:21, where the Greek is translated as "perhaps", but as "surely" in many English translations based on the Hebrew text. As the parable continues, the wicked husbandmen conspire to kill the son, in the expectation that the vineyard would pass to them. Finally, the owner comes and "destroys" those husbandmen and gives the vineyard to others.

=== Verse 16 ===
He will come and destroy those vinedressers and give the vineyard to others.
And when they heard it they said, 'Certainly not!'

In the climax of the story it is announced that the owner will come, to "destroy" those husbandmen and gives the vineyard to others. In Matthew's version, the proposal is put forward by those listening to the parable. "Certainly not!", or "No - never!", (Greek: μὴ γένοιτο, mē genoito), is a characteristically Pauline phrase only used here within the Gospels, but frequently in Paul’s Epistles: see Romans 6#The Bearing of Justification by Grace upon a Holy Life.

=== Verses 17–18 ===
^{17}Then He looked at them and said, "What then is this that is written:
The stone which the builders rejected
Has become the chief cornerstone?
^{18}Whoever falls on that stone will be broken; but on whomever it falls, it will grind him to powder.

These words, alluding to Isaiah 8:14–15, are tied to verse 16 as a response to μὴ γένοιτο. "What then ..." or "Why then ...", Greek: Τί οὖν, ti oun, infers the negation of μὴ γένοιτο: "How then, supposing your wish to be fulfilled, could this which is written come to pass?"

This parable concerned the chief priests and Pharisees and was given to the people present in the Temple during the final week before the death of Jesus.

== The Pharisees' question: Is it lawful to pay taxes to Caesar? (verses 20–26) ==
A question about the tribute money:

And they asked him, saying, Master, we know that thou sayest and teachest rightly, neither acceptest thou the person of any, but teachest the way of God truly.

Farrar's opinion is that "There is something in this fawning malice, and treacherous flattery, almost as repulsive as the kiss of Judas."

=== Verse 20 ===
So they watched Him, and sent spies who pretended to be righteous, that they might seize on His words, in order to deliver Him to the power and the authority of the governor.

These tactics are slightly different from the way they are presented by Matthew (Matthew 22:15) and Mark (Mark 12:13): they sent some Pharisees and some Herodians to trap him .... Luke is "on the one hand, less definite as to the parties to the conspiracy than the other Gospels, and on the other hand more explicit as to its aim". In this verse, Luke anticipates the events of Jesus' trial, when having questioned him before the Sanhedrin, they "arose and led Him to Pilate".

== The Sadducees' question: What about the resurrection? (verses 27–40) ==
Then some of the Sadducees, who deny that there is a resurrection, came to Him and asked ...

Using the example of a woman who has successively married seven brothers in accordance with the Mosaic rule of levirate marriage prescribed by Deuteronomy 25:5, the Sadducees put "something of a trick question" to Jesus, exploring "the sense in which life after death can be meaningful". Farrar notes that verses 27–39 relate the discomfiture of the Sadducees.

Verse 30 is the shortest verse in the New Testament in the original Greek:

καὶ ὁ δεύτερος — and the second

=== No further questions (verse 40) ===
Luke 20:40, and similarly Matthew 22:46, record that after this series of partisan questions, the scribes concluded that they were not able to outwit Jesus and "after that they dared not question Him anymore".

American theologian Albert Barnes suggests that "never was wisdom more clear, never more triumphant"; Farrar, in the Cambridge Bible for Schools and Colleges, reflects that at this point events became more perilous for Jesus as his opponents recognised that they would be unable "to pose themselves as superiors to [him] in wisdom and knowledge", and contempt was therefore "deepened into real hatred".

== Beware of the scribes (verses 41–47) ==
Verse 46 ("Beware of the scribes, who desire to go around in long robes, love greetings in the marketplaces, the best seats in the synagogues, and the best places at feasts ...") recalls the second of Luke's woes to the Pharisees:

Woe to you Pharisees! For you love the best seats in the synagogues and greetings in the marketplaces.

== See also ==
- Burning bush
- David
- Jerusalem
- John the Baptist
- Ministry of Jesus
- Moses
- Parables of Jesus
- Other related Bible parts: Exodus 3, Joshua 10, Psalm 110, Psalm 118, Matthew 21, Matthew 22, Matthew 23, Matthew 25, Mark 11, Mark 12, Acts 2, Acts 5; Romans 8; Hebrews 1, Hebrews 5, Hebrews 6, Hebrews 7, Hebrews 10, Hebrews 12

Preceded by Luke 19	Chapters of the Bible; Gospel of Luke	Succeeded by Luke 21
