= Hebrews 5 =

- ← chapter 4 chapter 6 →
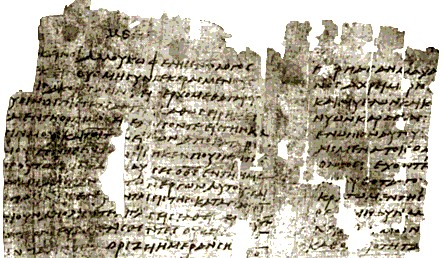
- Epistle to the Hebrews 2:14-5:5; 10:8-22; 10:29-11:13; 11:28-12:17 in Papyrus 13 (AD. 225-250).
- Book: Epistle to the Hebrews
- Category: General epistles
- Christian Bible part: New Testament
- Order in the Christian part: 19

Hebrews 5 is the fifth chapter of the Epistle to the Hebrews in the New Testament of the Christian Bible. The author is anonymous, although the internal reference to "our brother Timothy" (Hebrews 13:23) causes a traditional attribution to Paul, but this attribution has been disputed since the second century and there is no decisive evidence for the authorship. This chapter contains the exposition about the merciful Christ and the High Priests, followed by an exhortation to challenge the readers beyond the elementary catechism.

== Text ==
The original text was written in Koine Greek. This chapter is divided into 14 verses.

=== Textual witnesses ===
Some early manuscripts containing the text of this chapter are:

- Papyrus 46 (175–225; complete)
- Papyrus 13 (225-250; extant verse 1–5)
- Codex Vaticanus (325-350)
- Codex Sinaiticus (330-360)
- Codex Alexandrinus (400-440)
- Codex Ephraemi Rescriptus (~450; complete)
- Codex Freerianus (~450; extant verses 5–7)
- Codex Claromontanus (~550)

=== Old Testament references ===
- Hebrews 5:5: Psalm 2:7
- Hebrews 5:6: Psalm 110:4

=== New Testament references ===
- Hebrews 5:5: Acts 13:33; Hebrews 1:5

== The Merciful Christ and the High Priests (5:1–10) ==
The verses 1–4 highlight certain qualifications for high-priesthood under the old covenant, as a basis for applying it to Jesus to be the high priest for the new covenant (verses 5–6), who can 'sympathise with our weaknesses' without ever having sinned (verses 7–8; Hebrews 4:15), and was 'made completely adequate' as the savior of his people (verses 9–10).

=== Verse 1 ===
For every high priest taken from among men is appointed for men in things pertaining to God, that he may offer both gifts and sacrifices for sins.

This is a general definition of the high priest role in the Old Testament.

=== Verse 4 ===
And no man takes this honor to himself, but he who is called by God, just as Aaron was.

One must be called by God to the office of high-priesthood, because the honor of that office is given by God alone (cf. Exodus 28:1; Leviticus 8:1; Numbers 16-18).

=== Verse 5 ===
So also Christ did not glorify Himself to become High Priest, but it was He who said to Him:

"You are My Son,
Today I have begotten You."

Citing Psalm 2:7, which is also quoted in Acts 13:33 and used for exposition in Hebrews 5:5.

=== Verse 6 ===
As He also says in another place:

"You are a priest forever
According to the order of Melchizedek"

Citing Psalm 110:4.

== Admonition on Spiritual Immaturity (5:11–14) ==
This part gives warnings to the readers in preparation for the serious arguments in chapters 7–10, because the subsequent teaching about the high-priestly work of Christ will not be comprehended or applied by those who are slow to learn or continue to avoid solid food, unwilling to study the deeper faith implications, and if so, they can never be mature Christians.

=== Verse 11 ===
There is much more I would like to say along these lines, but you don’t seem to listen, so it’s hard to make you understand.

=== Verse 12 ===
For though by this time you ought to be teachers, you need someone to teach you again the first principles of the oracles of God; and you have come to need milk and not solid food.

- One sign of the slackness in the faith development is the unwillingness (or inability) to be teachers, that is, to explain the faith they learned to other people (cf. Hebrews 3:13; 10:24–25; 1 Thessalonians 5:11; 1 Peter 3:15).
- "Milk": the appropriate food for an infant, but mature people need solid food. Here, "milk" is equated with "the first principles of the oracles of God" (Greek: ta stoicheia tēs archēs tōn logiōn tou Theou), which could mean 'the guidelines' for interpreting the sayings of God (from a Christian point-of-view).

== See also ==
- Aaron
- High priest
- Jesus Christ
- Melchizedek
- Related Bible parts: Genesis 14, Leviticus 4, Leviticus 8, Numbers 15, Psalm 2, Psalm 110, Isaiah 50, Acts 13, Philippians 2, Hebrews 1, Hebrews 6, Hebrews 7

== Sources ==
- Attridge, Harold W. (2007). "75. Hebrews". In Barton, John; Muddiman, John (eds.). The Oxford Bible Commentary (first (paperback) ed.). Oxford University Press. pp. 1236–1254. ISBN 978-0199277186.
- Bruce, F. F. (1990). The Epistle to the Hebrews. New International Commentary on the New Testament (revised ed.). Wm. B. Eerdmans Publishing. ISBN 9780802825148.
- deSilva, David A. (2005). "Hebrews". In Evans, Craig A. (ed.). Bible Knowledge Background Commentary: John's Gospel, Hebrews-Revelation. The Bible Knowledge Series (illustrated ed.). Colorado Springs, Colo.: Victor. pp. 199–256. ISBN 9780781442282.
- Kirkpatrick, A. F. (1901). The Book of Psalms: with Introduction and Notes. The Cambridge Bible for Schools and Colleges. Vol. Book IV and V: Psalms XC-CL. Cambridge: At the University Press.
- Peterson, David (1994). "Hebrews". In Carson, D. A.; France, R. T.; Motyer, J. A.; Wenham, G. J. (eds.). New Bible Commentary: 21st Century Edition (4, illustrated, reprint, revised ed.). Inter-Varsity Press. pp. 1321–1353. ISBN 9780851106489.
