= Hebrews 11 =

- ← chapter 10 chapter 12 →
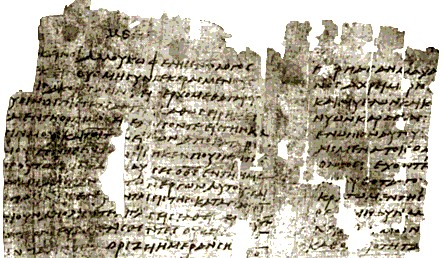
- Epistle to the Hebrews 2:14–5:5; 10:8–22; 10:29–11:13; 11:28–12:17 in Papyrus 13 (AD. 225–250).
- Book: Epistle to the Hebrews
- Category: General epistles
- Christian Bible part: New Testament
- Order in the Christian part: 19

Hebrews 11 is the eleventh chapter of the Epistle to the Hebrews in the New Testament of the Christian Bible. The author is anonymous, although the internal reference to "our brother Timothy" (Hebrews 13:23) causes a traditional attribution to Paul, but this attribution has been disputed since the second century and there is no decisive evidence for the authorship. This chapter contains the exposition about the examples of faith's effective expression.

== Text ==
The original text was written in Koine Greek. This chapter is divided into 40 verses.

=== Textual witnesses ===
Some early manuscripts containing the text of this chapter are:

- Papyrus 46 (175–225; complete)
- Papyrus 13 (225–50; extant verses 1–13, 28–40)
- Codex Vaticanus (325–50)
- Codex Sinaiticus (330–60)
- Codex Alexandrinus (400–40)
- Codex Freerianus (~450; extant verses 6–7, 12–15, 22–24, 31–33, 38–40)
- Codex Claromontanus (~550).

=== Old Testament references ===
- Hebrews 11:5: Genesis 5:24
- Hebrews 11:16: Jeremiah 31:33
- Hebrews 11:18: Genesis 21:12
- Hebrews 11:30: Deuteronomy 32:35

=== New Testament references ===
- Hebrews 11:30: Romans 12:19

== Introductory remarks on faith (verses 1–3) ==
The chapter opens with three allusive verses to describe the complexity of faith.

=== Verse 1 ===
Now faith is the substance of things hoped for, the evidence of things not seen.

Formal definition of faith is in the style of Plato's definition of medicine (Symposium 186c) or Plutarch's definition of curiosity (On Curiosity, 6.518c).

=== Verse 2 ===
For by it the elders obtained a good testimony.

The accounts of exemplary people were often used to motivate people, either to imitate noble attitudes or to avoid the pattern of ignoble behaviors, such as Ben Sira (teacher of wisdom form Jerusalem in 2nd century BC) uses a long hymn to praise notable Jewish ancestors (Sirach 44–51), or the author of 4 Macabee in 4 Macabee 16:16-23, and Seneca with similar list as in Hebrews 11 (Ben. 3.36.2–3.38.2; 5.16.1–5.17–3).

=== Verse 3 ===
By faith we understand that the worlds were framed by the word of God, so that the things which are seen were not made of things which are visible.

The list of examples starts appropriately with the creation, indicating that "faith" produces "understanding". The first manifestation of "trust" is connected to how a person of "faith" understands the visible creation as 'strictly secondary' to "things unseen".

== The primordial heroes (verses 4–7) ==
The first character, Abel, performed an 'acceptable sacrifice' (Genesis 4:4), and died as a martyr (Genesis 4:8). Abel's choice of superior quality of offering compared to Cain's second rate one (Philo, Sacr. AC 52, 57, 88) is related to the presence of "faith", which attests Abel to be "righteous" or "just" (Matthew 23:35; 1 John 3:12; Josephus, Antiq. 1.2.1 §53). Enoch 'pleased God' (Genesis 5:21–24 Septuagint (LXX) version, or Masoretic text text: 'walked with God') and was 'translated to heaven' according to Jewish tradition (such as Sirach 44:16; Philo, Mutat. 38; Josephus, Antiq. 1.85; 1 Enoch; 2 Enoch; 3 Enoch), indicating that having faith in God leads to the transcendence of death (cf. verses 4-6, 11-12, 17-19, 35). Noah believed in the 'unseen' event of divine judgment, and 'condemned' the world that didn't believe his preaching of repentance. The LXX version of Genesis 6:9 introduces Noah both as "righteous" and "pleasing to God", and thus connects naturally with "righteous" Abel and Enoch, who "pleased God".

=== Verse 6 ===
But without faith it is impossible to please Him, for he who comes to God must believe that He is, and that He is a rewarder of those who diligently seek Him.

This is one of the four things to be 'impossible' according to this epistle (Hebrews 6:4; 6:18; 10:4; 11:6).

- "Must believe that He is": The Arabic version renders "He is" as "He exists".

=== Verse 7 ===
By faith Noah, being warned by God concerning events as yet unseen, in reverent fear constructed an ark for the saving of his household. By this he condemned the world and became an heir of the righteousness that comes by faith.

Alexander Maclaren recalls that Noah was granted notice of the "coming catastrophe, with its certainties [both] of destruction and of deliverance". He adds

There was only one reason why he knew anything about that, and there was only one reason why he knew or believed anything about it, and that was because he believed Him who had told him.

== The faith of the patriarchs (verses 8–22) ==
Abraham is a foremost example of faith in Jewish and early Christian literature (cf. Sirach 44:19–21; 1 Maccabees 2:52; 4 Maccabees 16:20; Wisdom 10:5; Acts 7:2–8; Romans 4; Galatians 3:6–9). Sarah's faith is related to the conception and birth of Isaac (Genesis 17:15–18:15; 21:1–7), Isaac's to the blessings on Jacob and Esau (Genesis 27:27–40), Jacob's to the blessings on Ephraim and Manasseh (Genesis 48:8–22), and Joseph's to the prophecy concerning the transfer of his bones (Genesis 50:24–25) to hint a hope for the future of the family.

== The faith of Moses (verses 23–28) ==
Moses is known as a faithful servant of God in both Jewish and Christian writings (cf. Sirach 45:1–5; Philo, Vit. Mos. 1:10–11; Josephus, Antiq. 2.218; Acts 7:20–34; Hebrews 3:1–6).

== The faith of prophets and martyrs (verses 29–40) ==
A group of biblical characters is listed with shorter accounts, including Gideon, Barak, Samson, Jephthah, David and Samuel.

=== Verse 35 ===
Women received their dead by resurrection. Others were tortured, refusing to accept release, in order to obtain a better resurrection.

- Cross reference: 2 Maccabees 7

There is hope of eternal life after torture in this world.

== See also ==
- Abraham
- Barak
- Daniel
- David
- Gideon
- High priest
- Jephthah
- Jesus Christ
- Joseph
- Moses
- Noah
- Rahab
- Samson
- Samuel
- Tabernacle
- Related Bible parts: Genesis 4, Genesis 5, Genesis 6, Genesis 12, Genesis 21, Genesis 22, Genesis 27, Genesis 50, Exodus 2, Exodus 13, Exodus 14, Joshua 2, Joshua 6, Joshua 24, Judges 4, Judges 6, Judges 11, Judges 13, 1 Samuel 1, 1 Samuel 3, 1 Samuel 17, Daniel 6, Matthew 1, Hebrews 1, James 2, 2 Peter 3

== Bibliography ==
- Attridge, Harold W. (2007). "75. Hebrews". In Barton, John; Muddiman, John (eds.). The Oxford Bible Commentary (1st paperback ed.). Oxford University Press. pp. 1236–54. ISBN 978-0-19927718-6.
- deSilva, David A. (2005). "Hebrews". In Evans, Craig A. (ed.). Bible Knowledge Background Commentary: John's Gospel, Hebrews-Revelation. The Bible Knowledge Series (illustrated ed.). Colorado Springs, CO: Victor. pp. 199–256. ISBN 978-0-78144228-2.
