= Hebrews 1 =

- ← Philemon chapter 2 →
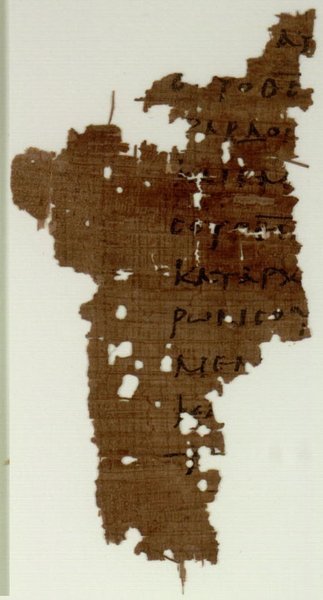
- Epistle to the Hebrews 1:7-12 in Papyrus 114, from ca. AD 250.
- Book: Epistle to the Hebrews
- Category: General epistles
- Christian Bible part: New Testament
- Order in the Christian part: 19

Hebrews 1 is the first chapter of the Epistle to the Hebrews in the New Testament of the Christian Bible. The author is anonymous, although the internal reference to "our brother Timothy" (Hebrews 13:23) causes a traditional attribution to Paul, but this attribution has been disputed since the second century and there is no decisive evidence for the authorship. This chapter contains the introduction ('exordium') about God's final revelation ('word') through his son and how the son is superior to angels.

== Text ==
The original text was written in Koine Greek. This chapter is divided into 14 verses.

=== Textual witnesses ===
Some early manuscripts containing the text of this chapter in Greek are:

- Papyrus 46 (175–225; complete)
- Papyrus 114 (~250)
- Papyrus 12 (~285; extant verse 1)
- Codex Vaticanus (325–50)
- Codex Sinaiticus (330–60)
- Codex Alexandrinus (400–40)
- Codex Freerianus (~450; extant verses 1–3, 9–12)
- Codex Claromontanus (~550)
- Codex Coislinianus (~550; extant verses 3–8)
- Uncial 0121b (10th century)

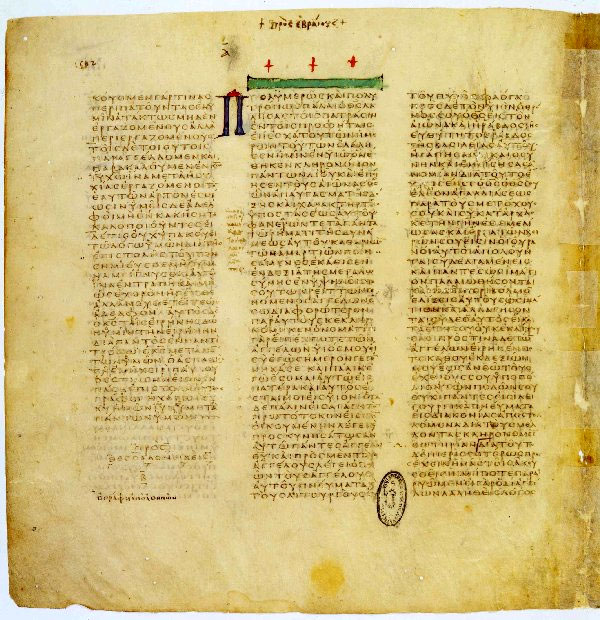
Pages containing 2 Thessalonians 3:11–8 and Hebrews 1:1–2:2 in Codex Vaticanus (AD. 325–50).

=== Old Testament references ===
- Hebrews 1:3: Book of Wisdom 7:16
- Hebrews 1:5: Psalm 2:7; 2 Samuel 7:14
- Hebrews 1:6: Deuteronomy 32:43 (Septuagint, Dead Sea Scrolls); Psalm 97:7
- Hebrews 1:7: Psalm 104:4
- Hebrews 1:8–9: Psalm 45:6–7
- Hebrews 1:10: Psalms 102:2 and Isaiah 34:4
- Hebrews 1:12: Psalm 102:25–27
- Hebrews 1:13: Psalm 110:1

=== New Testament references ===
- Hebrews 1:5: Acts 13:33; Hebrews 5:5
- Hebrews 1:13: Matthew 22:44

== Exordium: God's Final Word through His Son (1:1–4) ==
The Epistle to the Hebrews attests that God spoke decisively to Israel through the prophets and that he finally and fully revealed his character and will by his son, with the greatness and absolute superiority over the angels, the supernatural beings considered by Israel to be closest to God.

=== Verses 1–2 ===
^{1}God, who at various times and in various ways spoke in time past to the fathers by the prophets, ^{2}has in these last days spoken to us by His Son, whom He has appointed heir of all things, through whom also He made the worlds; (Note: The Greek texts of RP Byzantine Majority Text 2005 and of the Greek Orthodox Church start verse 2 at "whom He has appointed...", while incorporating all previous words in verse 1 of their numbering system)

While the Old Testament revelation (Note: Ancient Greek: ὁ Θεὸς λαλήσας τοῖς πατράσιν ἐν τοῖς προφήταις, ho Theos lalēsas tois patrasin en tois prophētais, "the God having-spoken to_the fathers in the prophets") in time past (Note: Greek: πάλαι, palai, "long ago") came at many times (Note: "At sundry times" (KJV); Greek: πολυμερῶς, polymerōs, "in many portions", "at various times", "in many parts" (one at one time, another at another, and so on) It is the first word in the Greek text of this verse) throughout the history of Israel and in various ways (Note: "In divers manners" (KJV); Greek: πολυτρόπως, polytropōs, "in many ways") such as 'dreams, visions and angelic messages', the ultimate revelation in these last days (Note: Greek: ἐπ’ ἐσχάτου τῶν ἡμερῶν τούτων, ep’ eschatou tōn hēmerōn toutōn, "in last of_the days these") of human history came through Jesus Christ as the Son of God, (Note: Greek: ἐν Υἱῷ, en Huiō, "in [His] Son") who was with God from the beginning and through whom God made the universe (Note: Greek: αἰῶνας, aiōnas, "ages" or "worlds") (basically 'the whole universe of space and time'; cf. Hebrews 11:3); the Son is also appointed as the heir of all things (Note: Greek: ὃν ἔθηκεν κληρονόμον πάντων, hon ethēken klēronomon pantōn, "whom [He] appointed heir of_all [things]") (cf. Psalm 2:7–8) to possess and rule over 'all that was created through him'.

=== Verses 3–4 ===
^{3}who being the brightness of His glory and the express image of His person, and upholding all things by the word of His power, when He had by Himself purged our sins, sat down at the right hand of the Majesty on high, ^{4}having become so much better than the angels, as He has by inheritance obtained a more excellent name than they.

- "The brightness of his glory and the express image of His person": or "the radiance of God's glory and the exact representation of his being" are revealed by the Son in his person to be what God is really like.
- "Sat down at the right hand of the Majesty on high" (cf. Psalm 110:1) is the heavenly enthronement of the Son of God which is the sequel of his atoning work.

== The Son's Superiority to Angels (1:5–14) ==
The reference to the heavenly enthronement of the Son in the previous part is followed by the explanation of his position to the angel world, using Psalm 110:1 as the framework to understand various other Old Testament texts.

=== Verse 5 ===
For to which of the angels did He ever say:

"You are My Son,
Today I have begotten You"?

And again:

"I will be to Him a Father,
And He shall be to Me a Son"?

Psalm 2:7 is cited because of the prophecy pertaining to the Messiah as Son of David, whereas 2 Samuel 7:14 is quoted as the theological basis from God's special promise to David and his dynasty. Psalm 2:7 is also quoted in Acts 13:33 and used for exposition in Hebrews 5:5.

=== Verse 6 ===
And again, when He brings the firstborn into the world, He says:

"Let all the angels of God worship Him."

Citing Psalm 97:7.

=== Verse 7 ===
And of the angels He says:

"Who makes His angels spirits
And His ministers a flame of fire."

Citing Psalm 104:4.

=== Verses 8–9 ===
^{8}But to the Son He says:

"Your throne, O God, lasts forever and ever;

a scepter of righteousness is the scepter of Your kingdom.

^{9}You have loved righteousness and hated wickedness;

therefore God, Your God, has anointed You
with the oil of gladness more than Your companions.

- Cross references: Hebrews 1:8: Psalm 45:6; Hebrews 1:9: Psalm 45:7; Isaiah 61:1 The citation from Psalm 45:6–7 (44:7–8 LXX) is the fifth explicit quotation in the catena of Hebrews 1:5–14, and unlike that of the Masoretic Text nor the Septuagint (LXX). Other than Psalm 45:1–2, which is quoted and given comments in 4Q171 (4QpPs^{a}), no verses of Psalm 45 explicitly quoted by any of the Judaism nor New Testament writers, except here. In the early Christian literature (after the publication of the Epistle to the Hebrews), the same quotation from Psalm 45:6-7 are quoted and interpreted christologically by some of the Church Fathers, such as Justin Martyr (Dial. 38.4; 56.14; 63.4), Origen (Cont. Cels. 1,56), Athanasius (Orat. Arian 26; Ep. Serap 26; Ep. Mar; Exp. Pss; Hom. sem.), Eusebius (Hist. Eccl. I 3, 14; Dem. Ev. IV 15, 15.49.57.58; IV 16, 47; V 1, 28; Eccl. Theol. I 20, 84; Generalis elementaria; Comm. Pss 23) and Gregory of Nyssa (Ant. Apoll. 3,1; Contr. Eun. 3,2; Test. Jud. 46).

=== Verses 10–12 ===
^{10}And,

"You, Lord, laid the foundation of the earth in the beginning,

and the heavens are the works of Your hands.

^{11}They will perish, but You remain;

and they all will wear out like a garment;

^{12}as a cloak You will fold them up,

and they will be changed.
But You are the same,
and Your years will not end."

=== Verse 13 ===
But to which of the angels has He ever said:

"Sit at My right hand,

Till I make Your enemies Your footstool"?

The cited words from Psalm 110:1 were quoted by Jesus (Matthew 22:44) and applied to Messiah, which must be greater than angels, because 'the angels do not exercise the authority and rule of the Son'. The image of enemies becoming a "footstool" (v 13) echoes Ancient Near-Eastern victory iconography—in royal reliefs a seated monarch literally rests his feet on captive rulers, signalling absolute domination. Early Christian writers such as John Chrysostom likewise contrasted the standing ministry of angels with the seated kingship of the Son.

== Uses ==
=== Music ===
The King James Version of verses 5–6 from this chapter is cited as texts in the English-language oratorio "Messiah" by George Frideric Handel (HWV 56).

== See also ==
- Angel
- Jesus Christ
- Related Bible parts: Numbers 12, Deuteronomy 4, Deuteronomy 32, 2 Samuel 7, Psalm 2, Psalm 45, Psalm 102, Psalm 104, Psalm 110, Psalm 148, Matthew 3, Matthew 11, Matthew 28, Luke 1, John 1, John 9, Acts 2, 13, Hebrews 2, 3, 4, 5, 7, 9, 11, 12; 1 Peter 1

== Sources ==
- Attridge, Harold W. (2007). "75. Hebrews". In Barton, John; Muddiman, John (eds.). The Oxford Bible Commentary (paperback) (1st ed.). Oxford University Press. pp. 1236–54. ISBN 978-0-19927718-6.
- deSilva, David A. (2005). "Hebrews". In Evans, Craig A. (ed.). Bible Knowledge Background Commentary: John's Gospel, Hebrews–Revelation. The Bible Knowledge Series (ill. ed.). Colorado Springs, CO: Victor. pp. 199–256. ISBN 978-0-78144228-2.
- Kirkpatrick, A. F. (1901). The Book of Psalms: with Introduction and Notes. The Cambridge Bible for Schools and Colleges. Vol. IV & V: Psalms XC–CL. Cambridge: At the University Press.
- Peterson, David (1994). "Hebrews". In Carson, D. A.; France, R. T.; Motyer, J. A.; Wenham, G. J. (eds.). New Bible Commentary: 21st Century Edition (4, illustr., repr., rev. ed.). Inter-Varsity Press. pp. 1321–53. ISBN 978-0-85110648-9.
