= Hebrews 6 =

- ← chapter 5 chapter 7 →
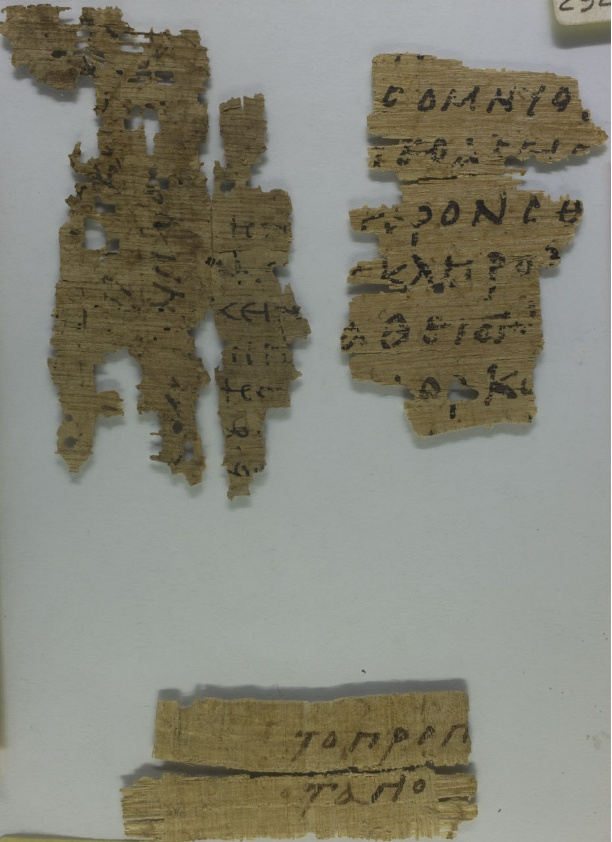
- Epistle to the Hebrews 6:7–9, 15–17 on the recto side of Papyrus 89 (4th century).
- Book: Epistle to the Hebrews
- Category: General epistles
- Christian Bible part: New Testament
- Order in the Christian part: 19

Hebrews 6 is the sixth chapter of the Epistle to the Hebrews in the New Testament of the Christian Bible. The author is anonymous, although the internal reference to "our brother Timothy" (Hebrews 13:23) causes a traditional attribution to Paul, but this attribution has been disputed since the second century and there is no decisive evidence for the authorship. This chapter contains the writer's admonition that believers must progress and persist in their faithfulness.

== Text ==
The original text was written in Koine Greek. This chapter is divided into 20 verses.

=== Textual witnesses ===
Some early manuscripts containing the text of this chapter are:

- Papyrus 46 (175–225; complete)
- Codex Vaticanus (325-350)
- Codex Sinaiticus (330-360)
- Papyrus 89 (4th century; extant verses 7–9, 15–17)
- Codex Alexandrinus (400-440)
- Codex Ephraemi Rescriptus (~450; complete)
- Codex Freerianus (~450; extant verses 1–3, 10–13, 20)
- Codex Claromontanus (~550)

=== Old Testament references ===
- Hebrews 6:14: Genesis 22:17
- Hebrews 6:20: Psalm 110:4

== Admonition (verses 1–8) ==
=== Verses 4–6 ===
^{4}For it is impossible for those who were once enlightened, who have tasted the heavenly gift, who shared in the Holy Spirit, ^{5}and have tasted the good word of God and the powers of the age to come, ^{6}if they fall away, to be renewed once more to repentance, since they again crucify to themselves the Son of God and subject Him to public shame.

According to this epistle, there are four things to be 'impossible' (Hebrews 6:4; 6:18; 10:4; 11:6); the first one is about the impossibility to restore apostates, resembling other early Christian expressions regarding what is termed the 'unforgivable sin' (Matthew 12:32; Mark 3:29; Luke 12:10) or the 'sin unto death' (also called the 'mortal sin'), which is also discussed in 1 John 5:16. In rejecting the one whose death brings salvation (verse 6), the apostates join those who disgracefully executed Jesus, whose solemn designation as 'Son of God' reinforces 'the heinousness of apostasy'. On the idea of crucifying Christ "again", Pope Pius XI observes that every sin, "in its own way, is held to renew the passion of Our Lord".

== Encouragement to persevere (verses 9–12) ==
=== Verse 10 ===
For God is not unjust to forget your work and labor of love which you have shown toward His name, in that you have ministered to the saints, and do minister.

According to David Peterson, to be aware that "God is not unjust to forget" is not to focus on the reward for services, but to appreciate that God knows the real situation of each peeson's spiritual life and he can motivate the expressions of 'genuine Christianity' anytime, just like in the past, also again in the future. The "work" and the "love" are those done literally 'for his name', involving the ministering of God's people (Greek: tois hagiois; "to the saints"), for example in Hebrews 10:32–34.

== The steadfastness of God's promise (verses 13–20) ==
=== Verse 13 ===
For when God made a promise to Abraham, because He could swear by no one greater, He swore by Himself,

Christian hope is based not on wishful thinking but on the 'solemn promise of God', that the foundation of God's saving activity in the world was the particular promise made to Abraham in Genesis 12:1–3 and repeated at different times and forms to the forefathers of Israel (cf. Genesis 15:1–21; 26:2–4; 28:13–15; Exodus 3:6–10).

=== Verse 14 ===
saying, “I will surely bless you and give you many descendants.”

=== Verse 18 ===
So that by two immutable things, in which it was impossible for God to lie, we who have fled for refuge might have strong encouragement to hold fast to the hope set before us.

This verse contains one of the four things said to be 'impossible' in this epistle (Hebrews 6:4; 6:18; 10:4; 11:6).

- "Immutable": or "unchangeable". The 'two unchangeable things' are apparently "the word of God" and "the confirming oath".

=== Verse 19 ===
This hope we have as an anchor of the soul, both sure and steadfast, and which enters the Presence behind the veil,

This verse and the next should be read in the light of Hebrews 7:20–22, that because Jesus is the promised high priest in the order of Melchizedek (Psalm 110:4 with an oath similar to the one in Genesis 22:16), he has become 'the guarantee' of the blessings of the new covenant (Hebrews 7:22), so those who rely on Jesus 'can actually enter the inner sanctuary behind the curtain ("the Presence behind the veil"), where 'he has gone before them and has entered on their behalf' ("the forerunner has entered for us", Hebrews 6:20).

- "Anchor of the soul": John Gill cites Pythagoras, who spoke about the anchor of soul as follows: "riches (he says) are a weak anchor, glory: is yet weaker; the body likewise; principalities, honours, all these are weak and without strength; what then are strong anchors? prudence, magnanimity, fortitude; these no tempest shakes" (Apud Stobaeum, Serm. I.).
- "Behind the veil": One Jewish text (Zohar in Gen. fol. 73. 3.) speaks of "a veil in the world to come, which some are worthy to enter into".

== See also ==
- Abraham
- High priest
- Jesus Christ
- Melchizedek
- Related Bible parts: Genesis 14, Genesis 21, Genesis 22, Leviticus 16, Numbers 23, Psalm 110, Isaiah 55

== Sources ==
- Attridge, Harold W. (2007). "75. Hebrews". In Barton, John; Muddiman, John (eds.). The Oxford Bible Commentary (first (paperback) ed.). Oxford University Press. pp. 1236–1254. ISBN 978-0199277186.
- Bruce, F. F. (1990). The Epistle to the Hebrews. New International Commentary on the New Testament (revised ed.). Wm. B. Eerdmans Publishing. ISBN 9780802825148.
- deSilva, David A. (2005). "Hebrews". In Evans, Craig A. (ed.). Bible Knowledge Background Commentary: John's Gospel, Hebrews-Revelation. The Bible Knowledge Series (illustrated ed.). Colorado Springs, Colo.: Victor. pp. 199–256. ISBN 9780781442282.
- Peterson, David (1994). "Hebrews". In Carson, D. A.; France, R. T.; Motyer, J. A.; Wenham, G. J. (eds.). New Bible Commentary: 21st Century Edition (4, illustrated, reprint, revised ed.). Inter-Varsity Press. pp. 1321–1353. ISBN 9780851106489.
