= Hebrews 9 =

- ← chapter 8 chapter 10 →
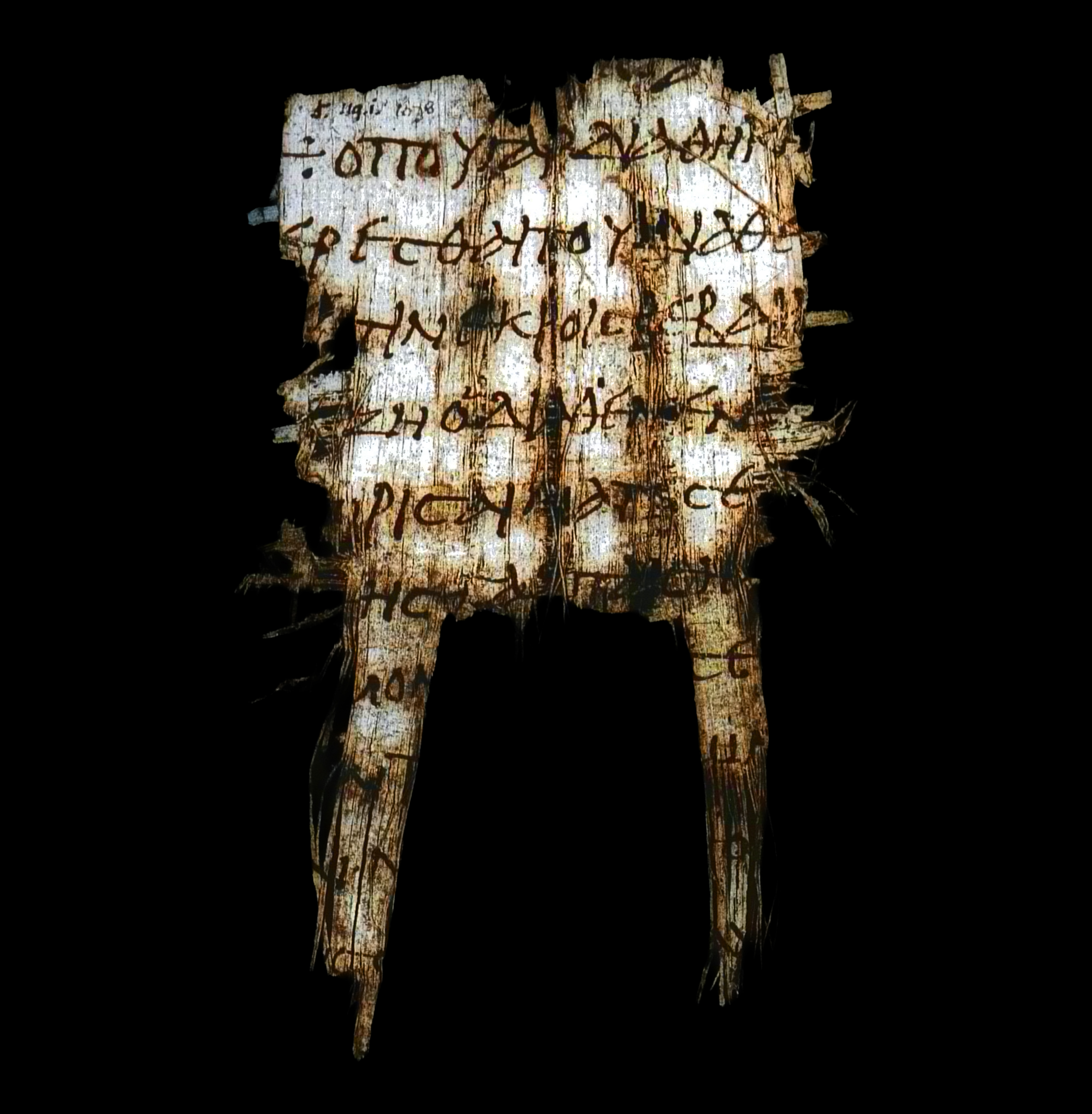
- Epistle to the Hebrews Hebrews 9:15–19 in Papyrus 17 (4th century).
- Book: Epistle to the Hebrews
- Category: General epistles
- Christian Bible part: New Testament
- Order in the Christian part: 19

Hebrews 9 is the ninth chapter of the Epistle to the Hebrews in the New Testament of the Christian Bible. The author is anonymous, although the internal reference to "our brother Timothy" (Hebrews 13:23) causes a traditional attribution to Paul, but this attribution has been disputed since the second century and there is no decisive evidence for the authorship. This chapter contains the exposition about the ministry of the first covenant and Christ's effective sacrifice.

== Text ==
The original text was written in Koine Greek. This chapter is divided into 28 verses.

=== Textual witnesses ===
Some early manuscripts containing the text of this chapter are:

- Papyrus 46 (175–225; only missing verse 17)
- Papyrus 17 (late 3rd century; extant verse 12–19)
- Codex Vaticanus (325–350)
- Codex Sinaiticus (330–360)
- Codex Alexandrinus (400–440)
- Codex Ephraemi Rescriptus (~450; extant verses 16–28)
- Codex Freerianus (~450; extant verses 1–4, 9–11, 16–19, 25–27)
- Codex Claromontanus (~550)

=== Old Testament references ===
- Hebrews 9:20: Exodus 24:8

== The Earthly Sanctuary (9:1–10) ==
The chapter opens with a contrast between 'the old and new covenants by reviewing the structure and rituals of the tabernacle'.

=== Verse 1 ===
Then indeed, even the first covenant had ordinances of divine service and the earthly sanctuary.

=== Verse 2 ===
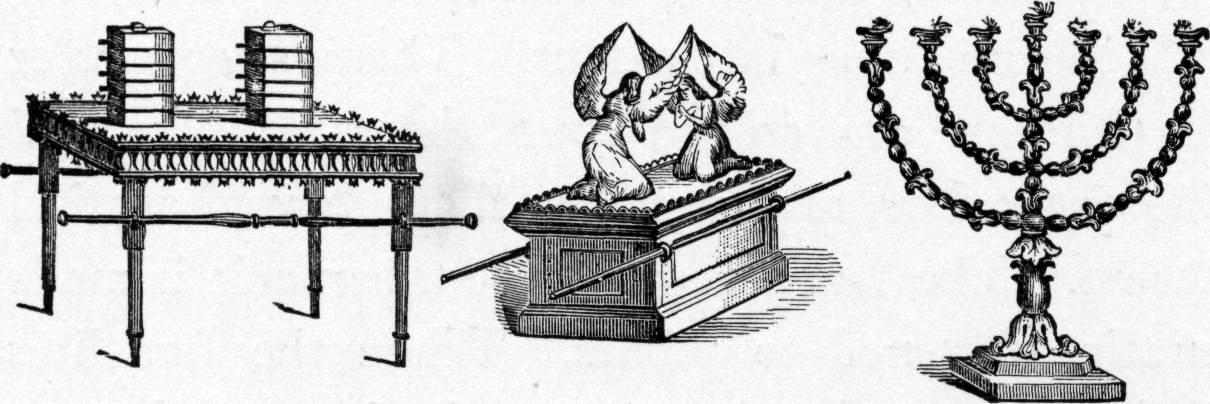
From left: The Table of Show-Bread, Ark of the Covenant, and Lampstand (Golden Candlestick) of the Biblical Tabernacle.

For a tabernacle was prepared: the first part, in which was the lampstand, the table, and the showbread, which is called the sanctuary;

=== Verse 3 ===
and behind the second veil, the part of the tabernacle which is called the Holiest of All,

=== Verse 4 ===
which had the golden censer and the ark of the covenant overlaid on all sides with gold, in which were the golden pot that had the manna, Aaron’s rod that budded, and the tablets of the covenant;

=== Verse 5 ===
and above it were the cherubim of glory overshadowing the mercy seat. Of these things we cannot now speak in detail.

- "Mercy seat" is translated from the Greek word hilasterion, which specifically means the lid of the Ark of the Covenant. The only other occurrence of hilasterion in the New Testament is in Romans 3:25, where the KJV translates it as "propitiation".

== The Ritual of the Heavenly Sanctuary (9:11-14) ==
The defining moment in current situation is when 'Christ came' as High Priest to fulfill the symbolized act of yearly ritual.

== The New Covenant (9:15-22) ==
The Greek word diathēkē has a range of meaning from 'contract' or 'treaty' to 'will' or 'testament', which is elaborated in legal language in this section.

=== Verse 15 ===
And for this reason He is the Mediator of the new covenant, by means of death, for the redemption of the transgressions under the first covenant, that those who are called may receive the promise of the eternal inheritance.

Cross reference for Jesus Christ as 'mediator' is Hebrews 8:6, and the designation of Christians as 'called' is Romans 1:6; 1 Corinthians 1:2; Jude 1; Revelation 17:14, and the phrase 'partners in a heavenly calling' is stated in 3:1. The promise of an 'inheritance' (1:14; 6:17) in 'ordinary legal usage' implies 'the death of a testator', who in this case then 'redeems' "the heirs from their transgressions" (cf. verse 12).

=== Verse 22 ===
And according to the law almost all things are purified with blood, and without shedding of blood there is no remission.

- "Almost all things": rendered in Arabic version as "all except a few things", interpreted by John Gill that "some things were cleansed by water, and others purged by fire" (cf. Numbers 31:23).
- "Without shedding of blood there is no remission": also found in Jewish literature as "there is no atonement but by blood"

== The New Heavenly Sacrifice (9:23-28) ==
The new description of Christ's 'heavenly' action in this part is balanced by the incorporation of the 'image of ritual purification' from the previous verses (9:11-14).

=== Verses 27-28 ===
^{27}And as it is appointed for men to die once, but after this the judgment, ^{28}so Christ was offered once to bear the sins of many.
To those who eagerly wait for Him He will appear a second time, apart from sin, for salvation.

Verse 27 is traditionally interpreted as the impossibility of reincarnation in Christian religions, that concerns both:

1. Jesus Christ God, after His Ascension to Heaven at the right hand of God the Father almighty;
2. any human being after his death, immediately undergone by the particular judgment.

== See also ==
- High priest
- Jesus Christ
- Moses
- Tabernacle
- Related Bible parts: Exodus 25, Exodus 26, Leviticus 16, Numbers 19, 2 Chronicles 26, Ezekiel 8, Hebrews 4

== Bibliography ==
- Attridge, Harold W. (2007). "75. Hebrews". In Barton, John; Muddiman, John (eds.). The Oxford Bible Commentary (first (paperback) ed.). Oxford University Press. pp. 1236–1254. ISBN 978-0199277186.
- deSilva, David A. (2005). "Hebrews". In Evans, Craig A. (ed.). Bible Knowledge Background Commentary: John's Gospel, Hebrews-Revelation. The Bible Knowledge Series (illustrated ed.). Colorado Springs, Colo.: Victor. pp. 199–256. ISBN 9780781442282.
