= P89 =

P89 may refer to:

- DLR P89 stock, a passenger train on the Docklands Light Railway in London, UK
- HMAS Assail (P 89), a patrol boat of the Royal Australian Navy
- Northrop XP-89, an American prototype fighter aircraft
- Papyrus 89, a biblical manuscript
- Ruger P89, a pistol
- P89, a state regional road in Latvia
