= Hebrews 10 =

- ← chapter 9 chapter 11 →
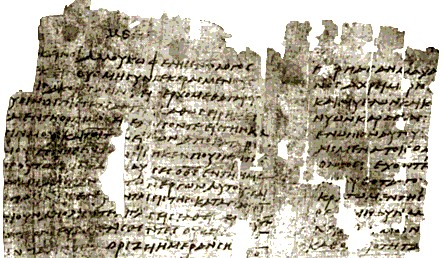
- Epistle to the Hebrews 2:14-5:5; 10:8-22; 10:29-11:13; 11:28-12:17 in Papyrus 13 (AD. 225-250).
- Book: Epistle to the Hebrews
- Category: General epistles
- Christian Bible part: New Testament
- Order in the Christian part: 19

Hebrews 10 is the tenth chapter of the Epistle to the Hebrews in the New Testament of the Christian Bible. The author is anonymous, although the internal reference to "our brother Timothy" (Hebrews 13:23) causes a traditional attribution to Paul, but this attribution has been disputed since the second century and there is no decisive evidence for the authorship. This chapter contains the exposition about Christ's effective sacrifice and the exhortation to continue in faithfulness and expectancy.

== Text ==
The original text was written in Koine Greek. This chapter is divided into 39 verses.

=== Textual witnesses ===
Some early manuscripts containing the text of this chapter are:

- Papyrus 46 (175–225; only missing verses 21 & 31)
- Papyrus 13 (225-250; extant verses 8-22, 29-39)
- Codex Vaticanus (325-350)
- Codex Sinaiticus (330-360)
- Codex Alexandrinus (400-440)
- Codex Ephraemi Rescriptus (~450; extant verses 1-23)
- Codex Freerianus (~450; extant verses 5-8,16-18,26-29,35-38)
- Codex Claromontanus (~550)
- Codex Coislinianus (~550; extant verses 1–7, 32–38)
- Papyrus 79 (7th century; extant verses 10-12, 28-30)

=== Old Testament references ===
- Hebrews 10:5–7: Psalm 40:6–8
- Hebrews 10:16: Jeremiah 31:33
- Hebrews 10:17: Jeremiah 31:34
- Hebrews 10:30: Deuteronomy 32:35–36; Psalm 135:14a
- Hebrews 10:38: Habakkuk 2:3, 4

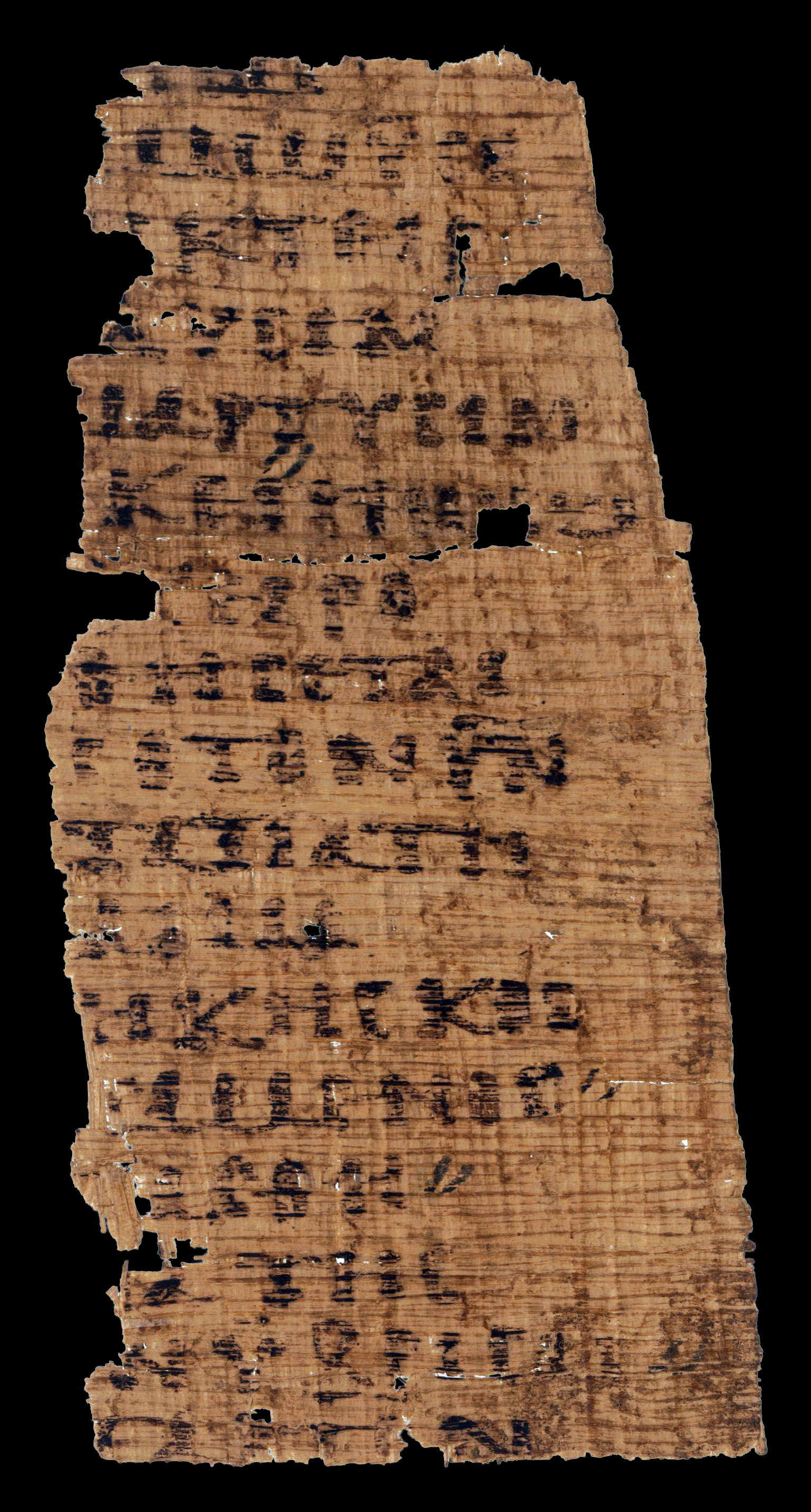
Epistle to the Hebrews 10:10-12 on the recto side of Papyrus 79 (7th century).

=== New Testament references ===
- Hebrews 10:30: Romans 12:19

== The True Sacrifice (10:1–10) ==
Attridge sees the final stage of Jeremiah 31 exposition to indicate that "Christ inaugurated the new and interior covenant by an act of conformity to God's will".

=== Verse 4 ===
For it is not possible for the blood of bulls and goats to take away sins.

This is one of the four things to be 'impossible' according to this epistle (Hebrews 6:4; 6:18; 10:4; 11:6).

=== Verse 5 ===
That is why, when Christ[a] came into the world, he said to God,

You did not want animal sacrifices or sin offerings. But you have given me a body to offer

=== Verse 10 ===
By that will we have been sanctified through the offering of the body of Jesus Christ once for all.

It is the will of God that the believers be sanctified (cf. 1 Thessalonians 4:3) and Christ's act of obedience made God's will his own, because Christ's death conformed to God's will (Galatians 1:4; Ephesians 1:5–11; 1 Peter 3:17) and Christ's obedience—attested in the Gethsemane story (Matthew 26:42; Luke 22:42) and the fourth gospel (John 4:34; 5:30; 6:38–40; 19:30—is decisive for establishing the new covenant.

It is the first time in the epistle that the composite name 'Jesus Christ' appears (cf. Hebrews 13:8).

== Summation (10:11–18) ==
This section weaves together the themes of the previous few chapters.

=== Verse 14 ===
For by one offering He has perfected forever those who are being sanctified.

- "By one offering": By his one sacrifice Jesus Christ did what the law of Moses, and all its sacrifices, could not do (Hebrews 10:1).
- "Those who are being sanctified" by God the Father (Jude 1:1) and set apart by him in internal election.

== Hold Fast to Faith (10:19–24) ==
This part contains an exhortation to live as members of the "new covenant" which stresses faith (verse 22), hope (verse 23) and love (verse 24), a traditional triad also seen in 1 Corinthians 13:13.

== Warning and Encouragement (10:24–39) ==
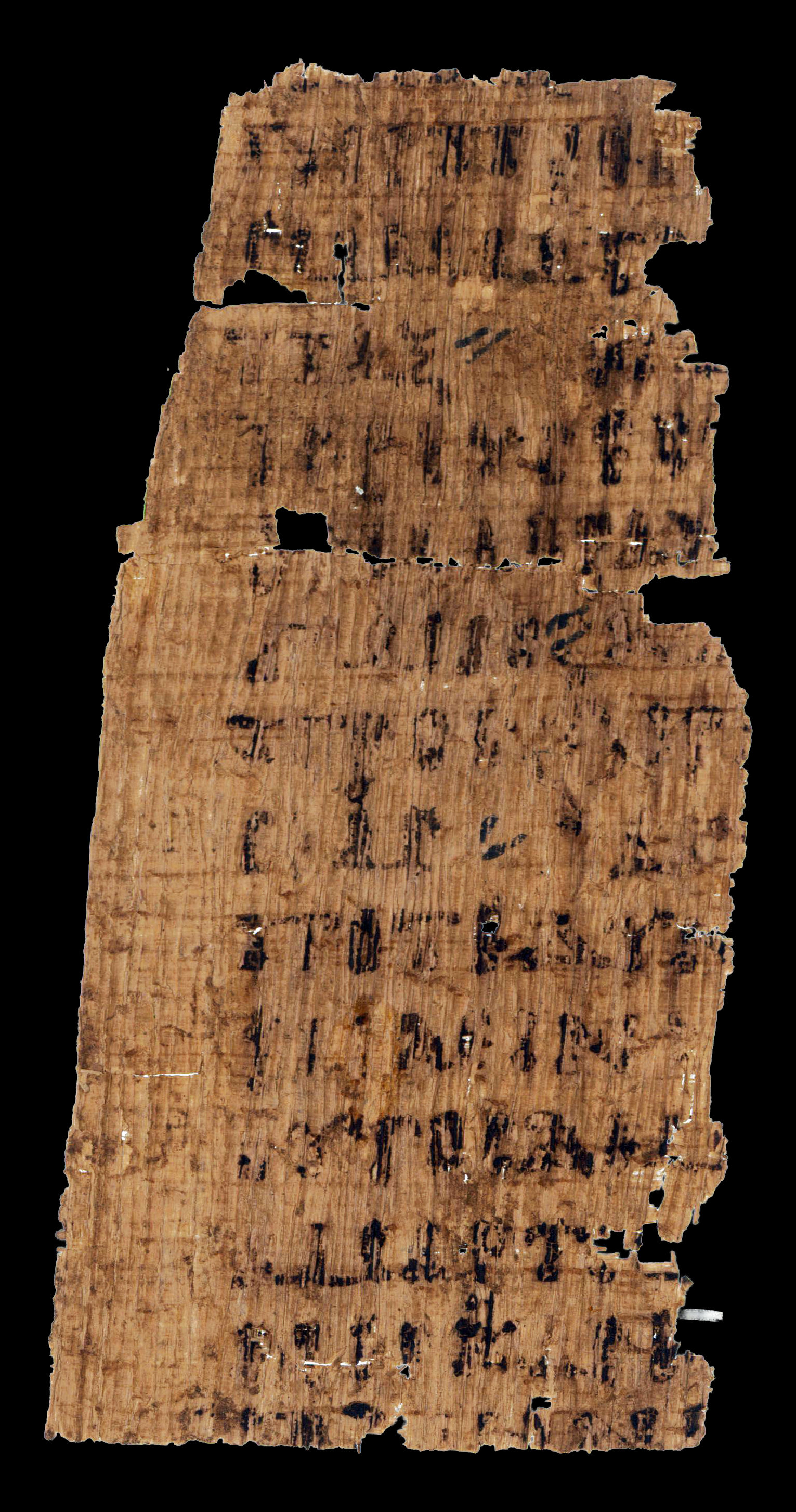
Epistle to the Hebrews 10:28-30 on the verso side of Papyrus 79 (7th century).

Verses 26-31 reference the unforgivable sin according to theologians, such as John Wesley. The encouragement in verse 32-29 balances the threat or warning in verses 24-31.

=== Verse 37 ===
"For yet a little while,
And He who is coming will come and will not tarry."

This verse combines the quote 'a little while' from Isaiah 26:20 with the quote 'will not tarry' from Habakkuk 2:3 in its Greek form, rendering it as a prediction of one 'who is coming' that points to the imminence of Christ's second coming.

- "Tarry": Delay.

=== Verse 38 ===
"Now the just shall live by faith;
But if anyone draws back, My soul has no pleasure in him."

Cited from the LXX version of Habakkuk 2:4 which reads:

If he shrinks back, my soul has no pleasure in him, but the righteous one will live by faith.

Here "he shrinks back" is not applied to the "coming one" but to "those who await God's deliverance."

Paul also cites Habakkuk 2:4 in Galatians 3:11 and Romans 1:17 to contrast "faith" and "works of the law".

=== Verse 39 ===
But we are not of those who draw back to perdition, but of those who believe to the saving of the soul.

- Cross reference: Luke 17:33
- "Perdition": or "destruction".

This verse contrasts the result of two opposite lines of action: εἰς ἀπώλειαν, eis apōleian ("to perdition/destruction") or εἰς περιποίησιν ψυχῆς, eis peripoiēsin psychēs, ("to the gaining of the soul"; cf. 1 Thessalonians 5:9: εἰς περιποίησιν σωτηρίας, eis peripoiēsin sōtērias, "to obtain salvation").

== See also ==
- High priest
- Jesus Christ
- Moses
- Tabernacle
- Related Bible parts: Exodus 25, Deuteronomy 32, Joshua 10, Psalm 40, Psalm 110, Jeremiah 31; Habakkuk 2, Acts 2, Acts 5; Romans 1, Romans 8; Hebrews 1

== Bibliography ==
- Attridge, Harold W. (2007). "75. Hebrews". In Barton, John; Muddiman, John (eds.). The Oxford Bible Commentary (first (paperback) ed.). Oxford University Press. pp. 1236–1254. ISBN 978-0199277186.
- deSilva, David A. (2005). "Hebrews". In Evans, Craig A. (ed.). Bible Knowledge Background Commentary: John's Gospel, Hebrews-Revelation. The Bible Knowledge Series (illustrated ed.). Colorado Springs, Colo.: Victor. pp. 199–256. ISBN 9780781442282.
- Kirkpatrick, A. F. (1901). The Book of Psalms: with Introduction and Notes. The Cambridge Bible for Schools and Colleges. Vol. Book IV and V: Psalms XC-CL. Cambridge: At the University Press.
