= Tripartite Tractate =

Christian Gnostic text

The Tripartite Tractate is a Valentinian Gnostic work. The date is estimated to the second half of the third century or the fourth century but is "most likely based on an earlier Greek version." It is the second-longest text in the Nag Hammadi library. It is the fifth tractate of the first codex, known as the Jung Codex. It is untitled, and instead it gets its name "from the fact that the ancient copyist divided the text with decorative markings in two places, thus separating the tractate into three parts." The first part describes the relationship between the Father, the Logos, the Church, and the aeons. The second part contains the Gnostic creation narrative, in which man is created by the Demiurge and is a mixture of both spiritual and material substances. The third part explains the Savior's role in salvation.

== Summary ==
=== Part I ===
The Father is the root of the Totality and the source of grace. He is seen as single, unbegotten, and immutable, existing before anything else came into being. The Father is considered unattainable and beyond human comprehension, filled with all his offspring, every virtue, and everything of value. The Father, Son, and Church have always existed, with the Son seen as the firstborn and only Son who reveals the Father's power, while the Church is described as the multitude of men that existed before the aeons and is called "the aeons of the aeons." The Church subsists in the procreations of innumerable aeons and is seen as existing in the dispositions and properties of the Father and the Son. The Father brought forth the Son, who is full, complete, and faultless, and raised him as a light for those who came from himself. The Son is described as incomparable and reveals the greatness of the Father's loftiness, even though he is ineffable, hidden, and invisible.

The text describes Gnostic cosmology and the relationship between the Father, the aeons, and the Logos. The aeons are seen as emanations and offspring of the Father's procreative nature and they glorify the Father, who gave root impulses to them and granted them faith, hope, love, understanding, and wisdom. The Father is known through the spirit that breathes in the Totalities and gives them the idea of seeking the unknown one. The Logos brought forth a perfect aeon but became weak through self-exaltation, causing division and self-doubt. However, he eventually raised himself back up to the aeons. The entire system of the aeons has a love and longing for the perfect discovery of the Father.

Initially, the Logos is in a state of confusion and creates beings that are divided and troubled. Through its conversion towards the good, it raises itself and helps others to do the same. The Logos prays to the one in the Pleroma and is remembered, leading to its return and creating greater powers. The beings created by the Logos are divided into forgetful, troubled dreams and light-filled beings with a pre-disposition to seek and pray to the pre-existent one. However, the order of the likeness creates empty matters and powers through envy, wrath, and ignorance. The Logos separated from the shadow beings and remained content with the beings of thought. The harmony of the aeons brought forth the beloved Son, who brought perfection to the defective one and confirmation to the perfect ones. The Father revealed the Totalities within him and directed the organization of the universe, giving the Logos power to reveal itself to those who came into being because of it. However, they fell down because they could not bear the appearance of the light.

The text describes the journey of the Logos, who was originally defective but later became illuminated. The Logos is referred to as the "Aeon" and "Place" of all those he brought forth and is also called the "Synagogue of Salvation," "Storehouse," "Bride," "Kingdom," and "Joy of the Lord." He performed this activity to bring stability to those he brought forth, and the aeon in which he set himself is a form of matter and an image of the Pleroma. He established the spiritual places and powers in the Pleroma and gave each of the beings of thought a name and placed them in different orders. The Logos kept the aeon of the images pure and set the word of beauty over those who belong to the likeness and the powers of lust for power as rulers over them to preserve the order. He granted the desire of the two orders and gave each one an appropriate rank and place to rule over.

=== Part II ===
This part describes the creation of man and the role of various powers in that creation. The matter that flows through its form is described as a cause of invisibility, and the power between those on the right and left is seen as a power of begetting. Man is seen as a shadow of the spiritual Logos and is created by the Demiurge and his servants. The Logos who was defective brought forth creation ignorantly and defectively, but the spiritual Logos gave the first form through the Demiurge to help him learn about the elevated one. The soul of the first human being is from the spiritual Logos, but the creator believes it to be his own. The creator and those of the left also brought forth their own men.

The spiritual substance is one and single, while the determination of the psychic substance is double, and the material substance is in many forms. The first human being is a mixture of both spiritual and material substances and is subject to both good and evil influences. He was created in a paradise, but due to the influence of the evil power (the serpent), he transgressed the divine command and was expelled from the paradise and subjected to death. This expulsion was a work of providence, so that man would experience the great evil of death and ignorance, but ultimately receive the greatest good of life eternal and firm knowledge of the Totalities. The death of humans is caused by the transgression of the first man, and death rules through its domination as a result of the Father's will.

=== Part III ===
The text discusses the beliefs of different peoples and cultures about the existence of things. "The Greeks and the barbarians" (who are also paired in The Thunder, Perfect Mind) have relied on imagination and vain thought to explain the world around them, leading to conflicting opinions and theories. On the other hand, the Hebrews have used the confused powers within them to attain the truth and reach the order of the unmixed ones. The righteous and prophetic figures among the Hebrews spoke based on what they saw and heard, not from imagination or likeness, but by the power that was at work in them. They all had a unified harmony and preserved the confession and testimony of the one greater than them, who is the illuminating word consisting of the thought and his offspring. Their vision and words did not differ, and those who listened to them did not reject any of it but interpreted the scriptures in different ways, leading to the formation of many heresies among the Jews. Some believe in a single God who made a proclamation in ancient scriptures, others in many gods, and others in a simple God who is linked to the establishment of good and evil.

The Savior became manifest through an involuntary suffering and took upon himself the death of those he sought to save. He was born without sin and was begotten in life, making him the image of the unitary one who is the Totality in bodily form. The others are images of each thing that became manifest and assume division from the pattern. The Savior was appointed to give life and all the rest need salvation, which began to receive grace through the promise of Jesus Christ. The release from captivity and the acceptance of freedom is the redemption, which is the knowledge of the truth that existed before the ignorance and slavery of the servile nature. Those brought forth in vanity through the lust for power have received the possession of freedom from the grace of the children. The Logos separated the evil things from himself, but allowed them to exist because they were useful for the things that were ordained.

The tripartition was the creation of three essential types of humanity: the spiritual, the psychic, and the material. Each type is known by its fruit and the coming of the Savior revealed their nature. The spiritual race is close to the Savior, the material race resists and will face destruction, while the psychic race is in the middle, having the potential for both good and evil. The spiritual race will be saved completely, the psychic race may escape to those who are good, and the material race will face destruction. Those from the order of the left, who denied the Lord, plotted evil against him and the church, will face condemnation. Those who confess the Lord, serve the church, and share in her sufferings and hope will have a share in her hope.

The conclusion explores the idea of redemption, which applies to humans, angels, images, and Pleromas of the aeons. The Father has foreknowledge of the redeemer, who is the Son, and gives him grace. The Father has a hidden and incomprehensible wisdom that is revealed to those who are worthy. Those who attain knowledge and good things were planned by the Father's wisdom. The text discusses election and the calling of those deemed worthy, with the cause of their existence being either the judgment of evil, the wrath of the exalted ones, the prayer of pre-existing beings, or the hope and faith of good works. The text mentions that even those brought forth from the desire of lust for power will receive a reward if they abandon their ambitions and keep the commandment of the Lord of glory. The conclusion praises the love of the Savior, who appeared in flesh and is believed to be the Son of the unknown God.

== Commentary ==
The work is introduced by Harold W. Attridge and Elaine H. Pagels in the James M. Robinson version of the Nag Hammadi Library. They state that the Tractate is "an elaborate, but untitled, Valentinian theological treatise which gives an account of devolution from and reintegration into the primordial godhead. The text is divided by scribal decoration into three segments which contain the major acts of the cosmic drama; hence its modern title." It represents a previously unknown revision of Valentinian theology in the above-mentioned scholars' opinions. They even posit that the text may be "a response to the criticism of orthodox theologians such as Irenaeus of Lyons or Hippolytus." They also notice that the text "displays some affinities with Origen's doctrines".

Furthermore, "The first part describes emanation of all supernatural entities from their primal source. It begins with the Father, described primarily as through a via negativa as an utterly transcendent entity. What can be affirmed is that he is unique and monadic. The insistence on the unitary character of the Father distinguishes the text from most other Valentinians who posit a primal masculine feminine dyad, although some members of the school, such as those mentioned by Hippolytus, also hold to a monadic first principle." The godhead is thus less complex. The Son and the Church (Ekklesia) then emanate from the Father. Rather than an ogdoad, a trinity is affirmed. While Eusebius of Caesarea mentions that Valentinus taught a trinity in his work 'on the three natures', this was likely a trinity of natures in one godhead rather than three persons.

Paul Linjamaa argues that ethically, the Tripartite Tractate is "an example of early Christian determinism." Although the Valentinians rejected free will, they did not "disregard ethics as irrelevant," as their opponents claimed.
