= Papyrus 114 =

- New Testament manuscript
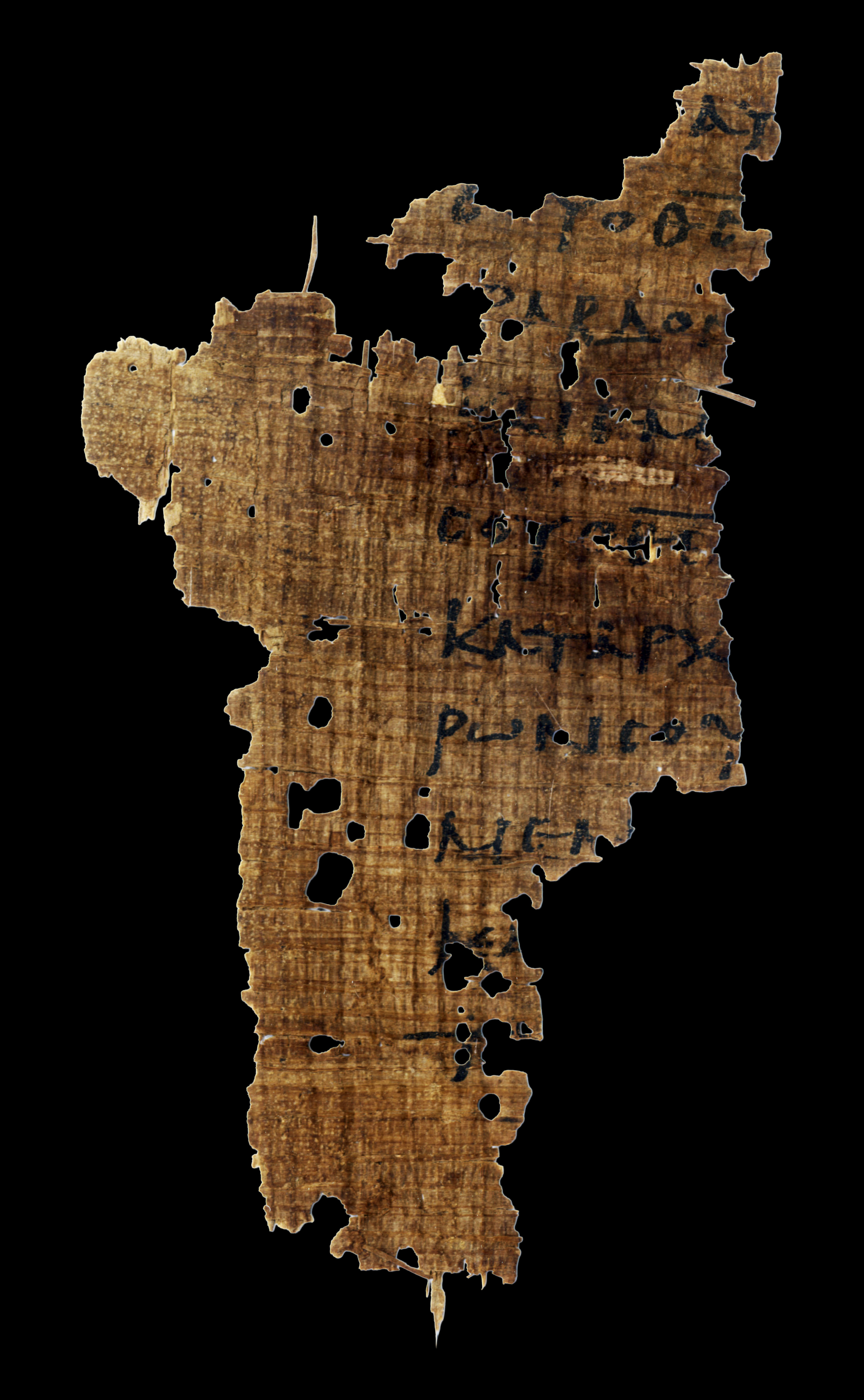
- Recto, Hebrews 1:7-12
- Name: P. Oxy. 4498
- Sign: 𝔓^{114}
- Text: Epistle to the Hebrews 1:7-12
- Date: 3rd century
- Script: Greek
- Found: Oxyrhynchus, Egypt
- Now at: Sackler Library
- Cite: W. E. H. Cockle, OP LXVI (1999), pp. 9-10
- Size: [15] x [25] cm
- Type: Alexandrian text-type (?)
- Category: none
- Note: unique reading in Heb 1:9

Papyrus 114 is a papyrus manuscript of the Letter to the Hebrews from the New Testament in Greek, containing verses 1:7-12 in a fragmentary condition. It is designated by the siglum 𝔓^{114} in the Gregory–Aland numbering of New Testament manuscripts.

Using the study of comparative writing styles (palaeography), the manuscript has been dated by the INTF to the 3rd century CE. Papyrologist Philip Comfort dates the manuscript to Middle-Late 3rd century CE. The manuscript is currently housed in the Papyrology Rooms (P. Oxy. 4498) of the Sackler Library at Oxford, United Kingdom.

== Description ==
The original manuscript would have been around 15cm x 25cm, with 27 lines per page. There is no extant writing on the opposite side, and so was either blank or contained the title.

The Greek text of this codex is too small to determine its textual character; the handwriting script is representative of the Reformed Documentary style.

== Textual variants ==
1:9

[ο Θ̅Σ̅] σου ο Θ̅Σ̅ (God, your God) : 𝔓^{114}
ο Θ̅Σ̅ ο Θ̅Σ̅ σου (God, your God) : 𝔓^{46} א A B Majority of manuscripts

1:12

ως ιματιον

incl. : 𝔓^{114} 𝔓^{46} א A B 1739 vg^{mss}
omit. : D^{1} Ψ 0243 0278 33 1881 K L P Majority of manuscripts lat sy sa^{ms} bo; Ath.

== See also ==
- List of New Testament papyri
- Oxyrhynchus Papyri
