= Hebrews 7 =

- ← chapter 6 chapter 8 →
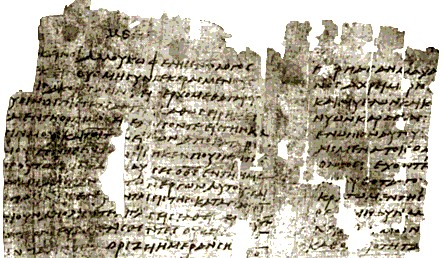
- Epistle to the Hebrews 2:14-5:5; 10:8-22; 10:29-11:13; 11:28-12:17 in Papyrus 13 (AD 225-250)
- Book: Epistle to the Hebrews
- Category: General epistles
- Christian Bible part: New Testament
- Order in the Christian part: 19

Hebrews 7 is the seventh chapter of the Epistle to the Hebrews in the New Testament of the Christian Bible. The author is anonymous, although the internal reference to "our brother Timothy" (Hebrews 13:23) causes a traditional attribution to Paul, but this attribution has been disputed since the second century and there is no decisive evidence for the authorship. This chapter contains an exposition about the superiority of Christ's priesthood using material from Melchizedek to the Levitical Priesthood.

== Text ==
The original text was written in Koine Greek. This chapter is divided into 28 verses.

=== Textual witnesses ===
Some early manuscripts containing the text of this chapter are:

- Papyrus 46 (175–225; complete)
- Codex Vaticanus (325-350)
- Codex Sinaiticus (330-360)
- Codex Alexandrinus (400-440)
- Codex Ephraemi Rescriptus (~450; extant verses 1-25)
- Codex Freerianus (~450; extant verses 1-2, 7-11, 18-20, 27-28)
- Codex Claromontanus (~550)

=== Old Testament references ===
- Melchizedek: Genesis 14
- Hebrews 7:17: Psalm 110:4
- Hebrews 7:21: Psalm 110:4

== Melchizedek the Priest-King (verses 1–3) ==
=== Verse 1 ===
For this Melchizedek, king of Salem, priest of the Most High God, who met Abraham returning from the slaughter of the kings and blessed him,

Melchizedek appears once only in the Old Testament, in Genesis 14. The "slaughter of the kings" took place at the Battle of Siddim.

=== Verse 2 ===
to whom also Abraham gave a tenth part of all, first being translated "king of righteousness”, and then also king of Salem, meaning “king of peace".

=== Verse 3 ===
[For this Melchizedek] without father, without mother, without genealogy, having neither beginning of days nor end of life, but made like the Son of God, remains a priest continually.

== The greatness of Melchizedek (verses 4–10) ==
=== Verse 4 ===
Now consider how great this man was, to whom even the patriarch Abraham gave a tenth of the spoils.

=== Verse 9 ===
Even Levi, who receives tithes, paid tithes through Abraham, so to speak,

== Imperfection of the Aaronic Priesthood (verses 11–14) ==
=== Verse 14 ===
For it is evident that our Lord arose from Judah, of which tribe Moses spoke nothing concerning priesthood.

== Superior Because of the Divine Oath (verses 20–22) ==
=== Verse 22 ===
by so much more Jesus has become a surety of a better covenant.

The further aspect of Jesus' priesthood is introduced here and will be explored in the next chapters, that is, Jesus' role as a "guarantor" ("surety"; Greek: ἔγγυος, engyos) of a better covenant, (Note: Ancient Greek: κρείττονος διαθήκης, kreittonos diathēkēs) superior to the old covenant as much as his priesthood is superior to that of Aaron. The author emphasizes the superior dignity of Jesus by arranging the weight of argument to fall on the word "Jesus" as the last word of this verse in the original Greek text.

- "Covenant" (Greek: diathēkēs): or "testament" (KJV), for the Greek word may signify both; a testament, because it is established in the good will of God, and includes an inheritance bequeathed by God the Father to his children, confirmed and given to them by the death of Christ the testator; and a covenant, because it is a compact or agreement made by the Father with Christ, as the representative of all the elect; is called in Scripture a "covenant of life and peace", and is also commonly called the "covenant of grace", because it springs from the grace of God, and the end of it is the glory of God's grace.

== Superior Because of Its Permanence (verses23–25) ==
=== Verse 24 ===
But He, because He continues forever, has an unchangeable priesthood.

=== Verse 25 ===
Therefore He is also able to save to the uttermost those who come to God through Him, since He always lives to make intercession for them.

== Superior Because of the Character of Jesus (verses 26–28) ==
=== Verses 26–27 ===
^{26}For such a High Priest was fitting for us, who is holy, harmless, undefiled, separate from sinners, and has become higher than the heavens; ^{27}who does not need daily, as those high priests, to offer up sacrifices, first for His own sins and then for the people’s, for this He did once for all when He offered up Himself.

There is no explicit ordinance for a high priest to offer daily sacrifices for his own sins, but 'inadvertent sinning' (such as described in Leviticus 4:1ff) could be a 'daily hazard' and, in his position, if not taken care of, it could bring guilt on the people. Therefore, it becomes a custom for the high priest to first offer sacrifices on his own account, before performing his task for the people, as also attested by the first-century Jewish writer, Philo.

=== Verse 28 ===
For the law appoints as high priests men who have weakness, but the word of the oath, which came after the law, appoints the Son who has been perfected forever.

The 'new and perpetual priesthood after Melchizedek's order', given under oath by the Divine acclamation, was designed to supersede the previous priesthood under the ancient law, which was beset by frailty and required sin offerings for the high priest as well as the people. The supersession became effective once the Messiah ("the Son") 'vindicated his high-priestly title on the basis of a perfect sacrifice', so his 'high-priesthood is absolutely efficacious and eternally suited to meet the need of his people'.

== See also ==
- Abraham
- High priest
- Jesus Christ
- Judah (biblical person)
- Levi
- Melchizedek
- Moses
- Related Bible parts: Genesis 14, Genesis 21, Genesis 22, Leviticus 16, Numbers 23, Psalm 110, Isaiah 55

== Sources ==
- Attridge, Harold W. (2007). "75. Hebrews". In Barton, John; Muddiman, John (eds.). The Oxford Bible Commentary (first (paperback) ed.). Oxford University Press. pp. 1236–1254. ISBN 978-0199277186.
- Bruce, F. F. (1990). The Epistle to the Hebrews. New International Commentary on the New Testament (revised ed.). Wm. B. Eerdmans Publishing. ISBN 9780802825148.
- deSilva, David A. (2005). "Hebrews". In Evans, Craig A. (ed.). Bible Knowledge Background Commentary: John's Gospel, Hebrews-Revelation. The Bible Knowledge Series (illustrated ed.). Colorado Springs, Colo.: Victor. pp. 199–256. ISBN 9780781442282.
- Kirkpatrick, A. F. (1901). The Book of Psalms: with Introduction and Notes. The Cambridge Bible for Schools and Colleges. Vol. Book IV and V: Psalms XC-CL. Cambridge: At the University Press.
