= Hebrews 12 =

- ← chapter 11 chapter 13 →
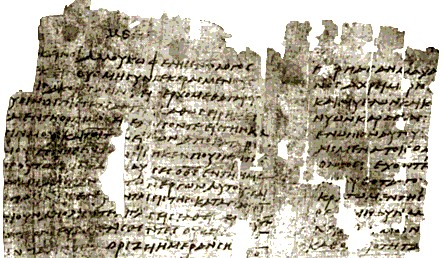
- Epistle to the Hebrews 2:14-5:5; 10:8-22; 10:29-11:13; 11:28-12:17 in Papyrus 13 (AD. 225-250).
- Book: Epistle to the Hebrews
- Category: General epistles
- Christian Bible part: New Testament
- Order in the Christian part: 19

Hebrews 12 is the twelfth chapter of the Epistle to the Hebrews in the New Testament of the Christian Bible. The author is anonymous; however, an internal reference to "our brother Timothy" (Hebrews 13:23) has traditionally led to the text's attribution to Paul the Apostle. The traditional Pauline authorship has been debated since the second century CE, and there is no conclusive evidence for its authorship. Chapter 12 contains the call to respond gratefully and nobly to God's invitation.

== Text ==
The original text was written in Koine Greek. This chapter is divided into 29 verses.

=== Textual witnesses ===
Some early manuscripts containing the text of this chapter are:

- Papyrus 46 (175–225; complete)
- Papyrus 13 (AD 225-250; extant verses 1-17)
- Codex Vaticanus (325-350)
- Codex Sinaiticus (330-360)
- Codex Alexandrinus (400-440)
- Codex Ephraemi Rescriptus (ca. 450; extant verses 16-29)
- Codex Freerianus (~450; extant verses 1,7-9,16-18,25-27)
- Codex Claromontanus (~550)
- Codex Coislinianus (ca. 550; extant verses 10–15)

=== Old Testament references ===
- Hebrews 12:6: Proverbs 3:11, 12
- Hebrews 12:20: Exodus 19:12, 13
- Hebrews 12:21: Deuteronomy 9:19
- Hebrews 12:26: Haggai 2:6

== Jesus, the Pioneer and Perfecter of Faith (12:1–3) ==
=== Verses 1–2 ===
Therefore we also, since we are surrounded by so great a cloud of witnesses, let us lay aside every weight, and the sin which so easily ensnares us, and let us run with endurance the race that is set before us, ^{2}looking unto Jesus, the author and finisher of our faith, who for the joy that was set before Him endured the cross, despising the shame, and has sat down at the right hand of the throne of God.

== Pay Heed to the Voice of God! (12:25–29) ==
=== Verse 28 ===
Therefore, since we are receiving a kingdom which cannot be shaken, let us have grace, by which we may[j] serve God acceptably with reverence and godly fear.

== Uses ==
=== Music ===
Bobby McFerrin based the lyrics of the song "Discipline" from his 1990 album Medicine Music on several verses in this chapter.

== See also ==
- Abel
- Esau
- High priest
- Jesus Christ
- Moses
- Mount Zion
- Tabernacle
- Related Bible parts: Genesis 4, Genesis 27, Exodus 19, Deuteronomy 9, Proverbs 3, Haggai 2

== Bibliography ==
- Attridge, Harold W. (2007). "75. Hebrews". In Barton, John; Muddiman, John (eds.). The Oxford Bible Commentary (first (paperback) ed.). Oxford University Press. pp. 1236–1254. ISBN 978-0199277186.
- deSilva, David A. (2005). "Hebrews". In Evans, Craig A. (ed.). Bible Knowledge Background Commentary: John's Gospel, Hebrews-Revelation. The Bible Knowledge Series (illustrated ed.). Colorado Springs, Colo.: Victor. pp. 199–256. ISBN 9780781442282.
