= Papyrus 89 =

Papyrus 𝔓^{89}
- New Testament manuscript
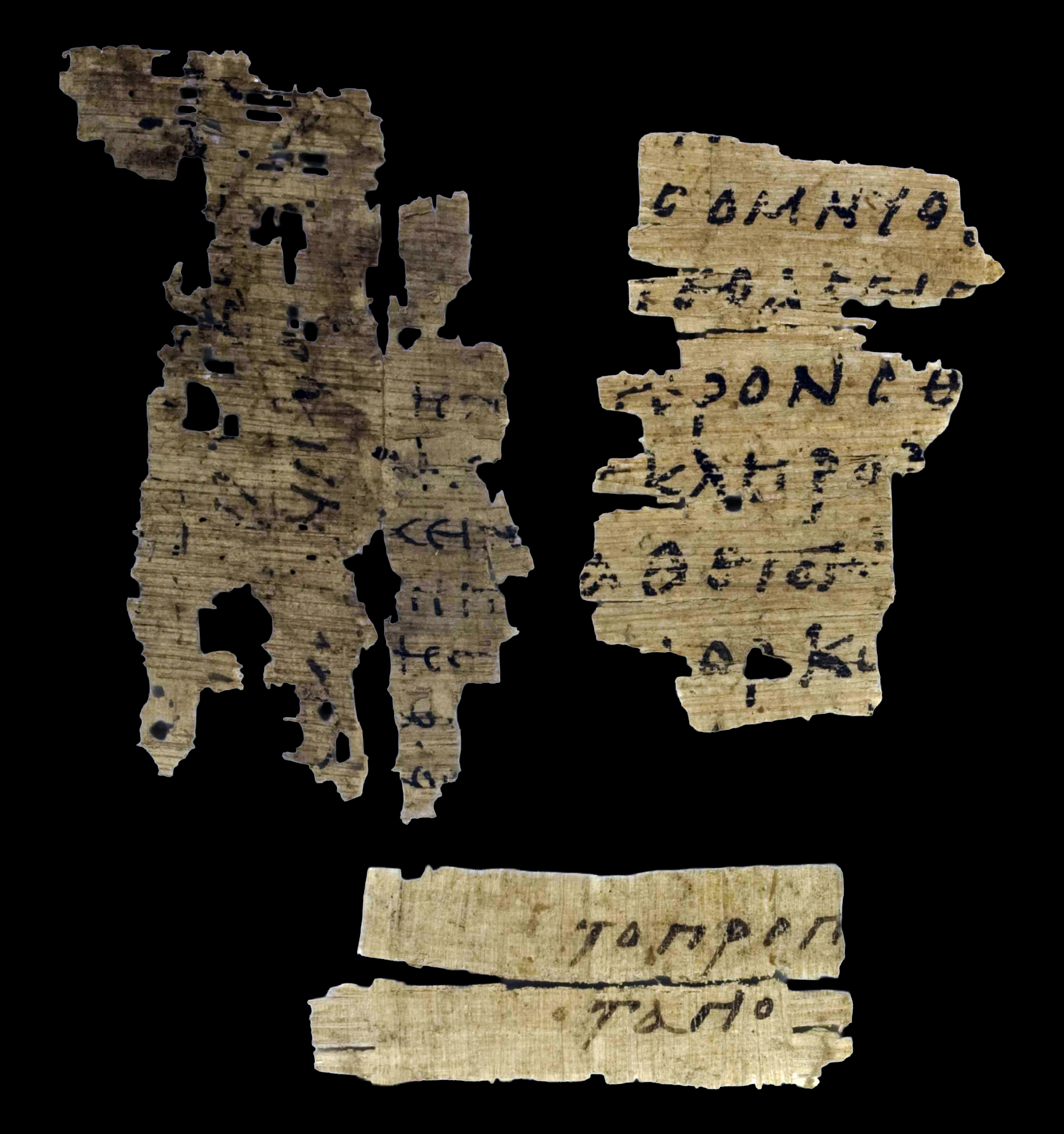
- Recto, Hebrews 6:16–17
- Text: Epistle to the Hebrews 6 †
- Date: 4th century
- Script: Greek
- Found: Egypt
- Now at: Laurentian Library
- Cite: R. Pintaudi, N.T. Ad Hebraeos VI, 7–9; 15–17, ZPE 42 (1981), pp. 42–44.
- Type: unknown
- Category: none

Papyrus 89 (in the Gregory-Aland numbering), designated by 𝔓^{89}, is an early copy of the New Testament in Greek. It is a papyrus manuscript of the Epistle to the Hebrews. The surviving texts of Hebrews are verses 6:7–9,15–17.

The manuscript palaeographically has been assigned to the 4th century.

== Text ==
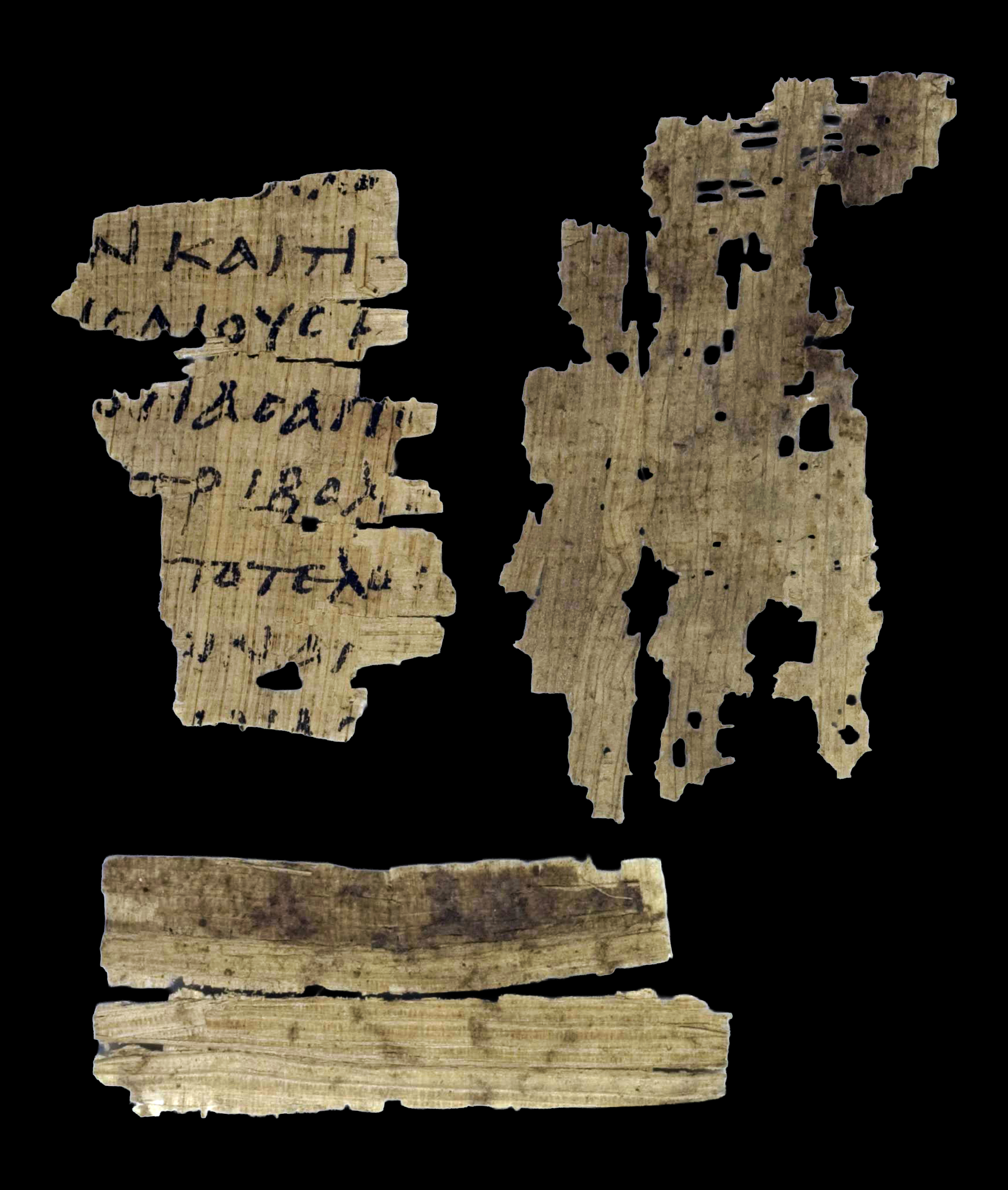
Verso, Hebrews 6:7-9

The Greek text of this codex is too brief for classification. Aland did not place it in any Category of New Testament manuscripts.

== Location ==
It is currently housed at the Biblioteca Medicea Laurenziana (PL III/292) in Florence.

== See also ==
- List of New Testament papyri
