= David G. Peterson =

- Born: 28 October 1944 (age 81)
- Occupations: Biblical academic and commentator
- Spouse: Lesley

Academic background
- Education: University of London, University of Sydney
- Alma mater: University of Manchester (PhD)
- Thesis: The Concept of Perfection in the 'Letter to the Hebrews’ (1978)
- Doctoral advisor: F. F. Bruce

Academic work
- Discipline: Biblical studies
- Sub-discipline: New Testament & Pauline studies
- Institutions: Oak Hill Theological College; Moore Theological College
- Notable works: The Acts of the Apostles (PNTC)

David G. Peterson, (born 28 October 1944) is a scholar of the New Testament. He was senior research fellow and lecturer in New Testament at Moore Theological College in Sydney and is an ordained minister of the Anglican Church of Australia. He now lectures at the college part-time.

Peterson was educated at North Sydney Boys High School, followed by a B.D. from the University of London, an M.A. from the University of Sydney, and finally a PhD from the University of Manchester. His thesis was titled "The Concept of Perfection in the 'Letter to the Hebrews'".

Peterson was between 1996 and 2007 the Principal of Oak Hill Theological College, London lecturing in Biblical Studies and Worship. During this period he also became a visiting professor at Middlesex University. He now lectures on a part-time basis at Moore Theological College in Sydney, writing new books, and leading an introductory course on preaching called Cornhill Sydney.

He is married to Lesley and they have three sons.

== Selected works ==
=== Books ===
- Peterson, David G. (1982). Hebrews and Perfection. SNTS Monograph Series. Vol. 47. Cambridge: Cambridge University Press. ISBN 978-0-5212-4408-4.
- ———; O'Brien, Peter T., eds. (1986). God who is Rich in Mercy. Essays presented to D. B. Knox. Homebush West/Grand Rapids: Lancer/Baker. ISBN 978-0-8589-2277-8.
- ———; Pryor, John, eds. (1992). In the Fulness of Time. Biblical Studies in Honour of Archbishop Donald Robinson. Homebush West: Lancer. ISBN 978-0-8589-2516-8.
- ——— (1993). Engaging with God: a Biblical Theology of Worship. Leicester / Grand Rapids, MI: Apollos / Eerdmans. ISBN 978-0-8511-1428-6.
- ——— (1995). Possessed by God: a New Testament Theology of Sanctification and Holiness. New Studies in Biblical Theology. Vol. 1. Leicester / Grand Rapids, MI: Apollos / Eerdmans. ISBN 978-0-8511-1510-8.
- ———; Marshall, I. Howard, eds. (1998). Witness to the Gospel: The Theology of Acts. Grand Rapids, MI: Eerdmans. ISBN 978-0-8028-4435-4.
- ———, ed. (1999). Witness to the World: Papers from the Second Oak Hill College Annual School of Theology. Carlisle: Paternoster. ISBN 978-0-8536-4954-0.
- ———, ed. (2001). "Where Wrath and Mercy Meet". Proclaiming the Atonement Today: Papers from the Fourth Oak Hill College Annual School of Theology. Carlisle: Paternoster. ISBN 978-1-8422-7079-0.
- ———, ed. (2003). "The Word became flesh". Evangelicals and the Incarnation: Papers from the Sixth Oak Hill College Annual School of Theology. Carlisle: Paternoster.
- ——— (2003). Christ and his People. Leicester: IVP. ISBN 978-0-8511-1689-1.
- ———, ed. (2004). "Holiness and Sexuality" Homosexuality in a biblical context: Papers from the Seventh Oak Hill College Annual School of Theology. Carlisle: Paternoster.
- ———, ed. (2004). Holiness and Sexuality: Being Distinctly Christian. Authentic Media. ISBN 978-1-8422-7269-5.
- ——— (2009). The Acts of the Apostles. Pillar New Testament Commentary. Vol. 47. Grand Rapids, MI / Leicester: Eerdmans / Apollos. ISBN 978-1-8447-4386-5.
- ——— (2012). Transformed by God: New Covenant Life and Ministry. Nottingham: IVP. ISBN 978-1844745678.
- ——— (2013). Encountering God Together: Biblical Patterns for Ministry and Worship (1st ed.). Nottingham: IVP. ISBN 978-1-8447-4607-1.
- ——— (2014). Encountering God Together: Leading Worship Services That Honor God, Minister to His People, and Build His Church (US ed.). P & R Publishing. ISBN 978-1-5963-8706-5.
- ——— (2017). Romans (Biblical Theology for Christian Proclamation) (1st ed.). Holman Reference. ISBN 978-0805496222.
- ——— (2020). Hebrews: An Introduction and Commentary (1st ed.). IVP Academic. ISBN 978-0830842995.
- ——— (2021). Romans: Evangelical Biblical Theology Commentary (1st ed.). Lexham Press. ISBN 978-1683594277.

=== Articles and chapters ===
- ——— (1996). "The Situation of the "Hebrews" (5:11-6:12)". Reformed Theological Review. 35 (1).
- ——— (1993). "Worship and Ethics in Romans 12". Tyndale Bulletin. 44 (2): 271–288. doi:10.53751/001c.30460. S2CID 13791365.
- ——— (1994). "Hebrews". In Carson, D. A.; et al. (eds.). The New Bible Commentary (21st Century ed.). Leicester: IVP. ISBN 978-0-8511-0648-9.
