= Papyrus 13 =

3rd century biblical manuscript

Papyrus Papyri 𝔓^{13}
- New Testament manuscript
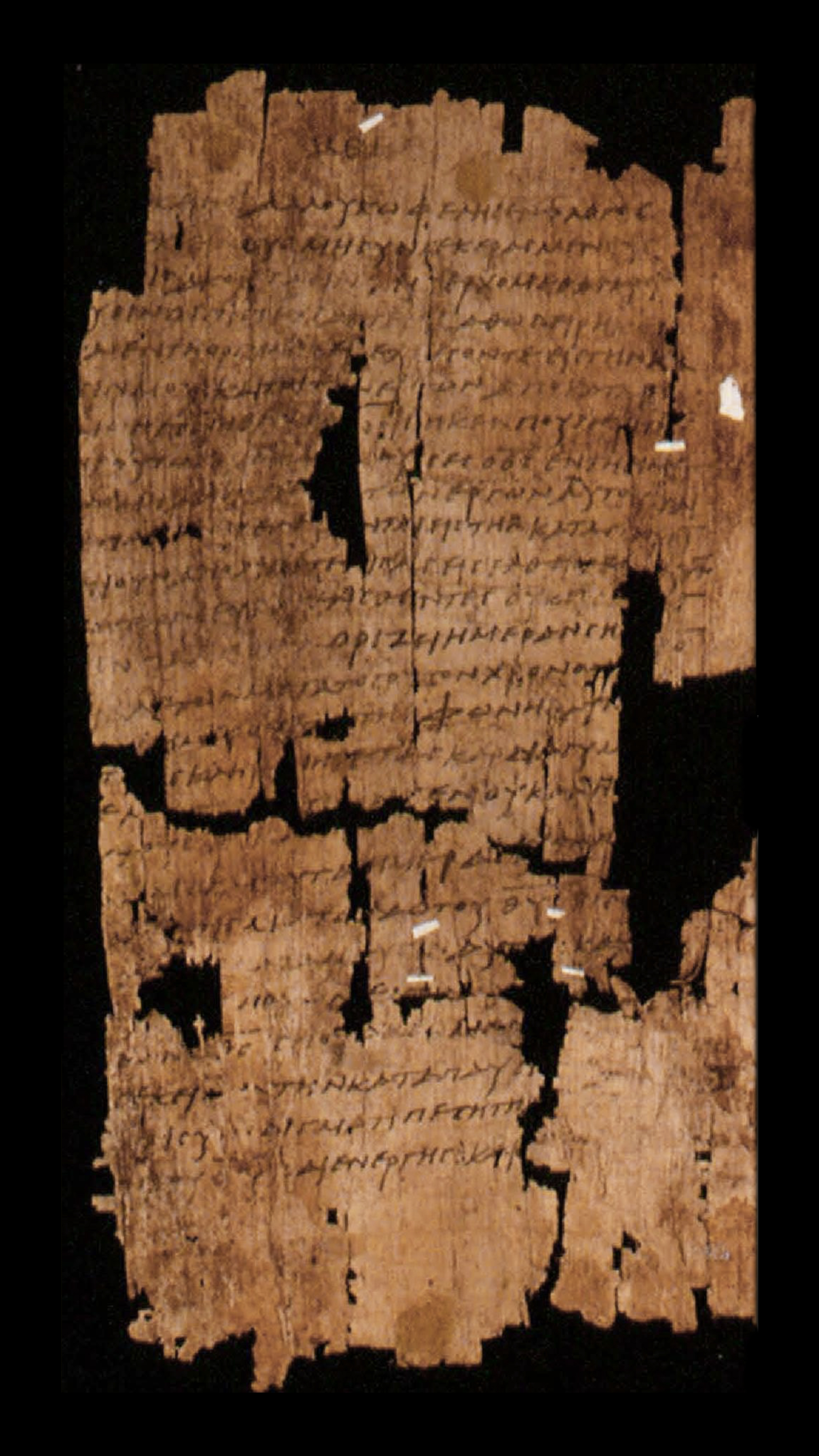
- Portions of two columns of P13, beginning with Hebrews 4:2. Note the surviving numbering at the top of the left column.
- Name: P. Oxyrhynchus 657
- Text: Hebrews 2:14-5:5; 10:8-22; 10:29-11:14; 11:28-12:17
- Date: c. 225-250
- Script: Greek
- Found: Oxyrhynchus, Egypt
- Now at: British Library/Egyptian Museum
- Cite: Grenfell & Hunt, Oxyrynchus Papyri 4:36-48. (#657)
- Size: 12 columns of scroll; 23-27 lines/column; pagination legible: 47-50, 61-65, 67-69.
- Type: Alexandrian, often agrees with Vaticanus; 80% with Papyrus 46
- Category: I
- Note: Written on a Scroll. Largest papyrus other than Chester Beatty collection

Papyrus 13, designated by siglum 𝔓^{13} or P^{13} in the Gregory-Aland numbering, is a fragmentary manuscript of the New Testament in Greek. It was copied on papyrus in the 3rd century at approximately 225-250 CE.

== Description ==
Papyrus 13 was discovered by Bernard Grenfell and Arthur Hunt in Oxyrhynchus, Egypt. It is currently housed at the British Library, Inv. Nr. 1532, and Egyptian Museum, SR 3796 25/1/55/2 (11), or PSI 1292.

The surviving text is twelve columns, of 23 to 27 lines each, from a scroll. This is all from the Epistle to the Hebrews, namely 2:14-5:5; 10:8-22; 10:29-11:14; 11:28-12:17. Its presence of pagination 47-50 means that Hebrews was preceded by only one book in the original scroll, likely the Epistle to the Romans as in Papyrus 46. It is the largest papyrus manuscript of the New Testament outside the Chester Beatty Papyri.

It was written on the back of a papyrus containing the Epitome of Livy and some scholars think the manuscript was possibly brought to Egypt by a Roman official and left behind when he left his post.

It has errors of itacism (ι and ει, ε and αι, υ and οι).

== Text ==
Papyrus 13 is a representative of the Alexandrian text-type. Aland placed it in Category I.

It bears strong textual affinity with Codex Vaticanus, and also has an 80% agreement with Papyrus 46. It has numerous distinctive readings.

Papyrus 13 is written recto-verso, with the verso (back) containing Hebrews and the recto (front) containing part of Livy's History of Rome, dated to around 200 AD.

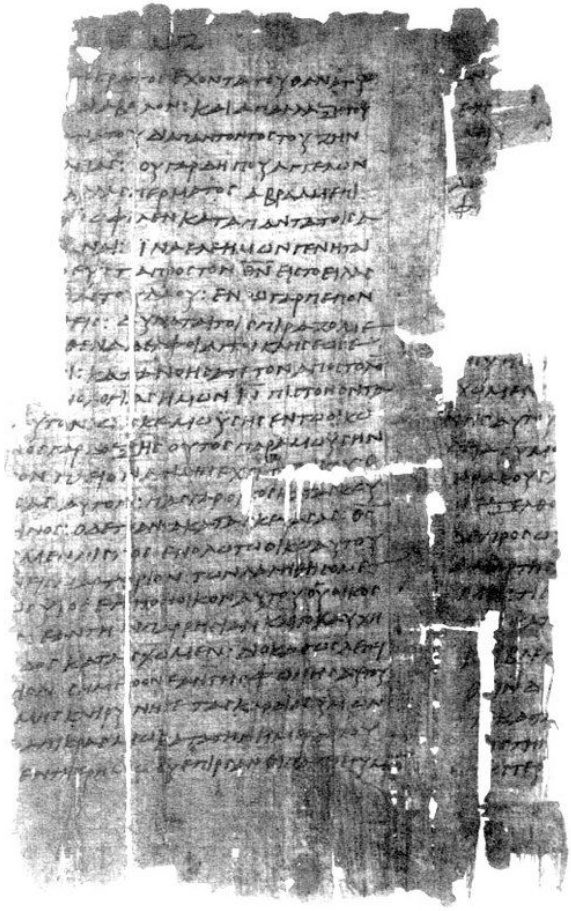
British Library
Papyrus 1532

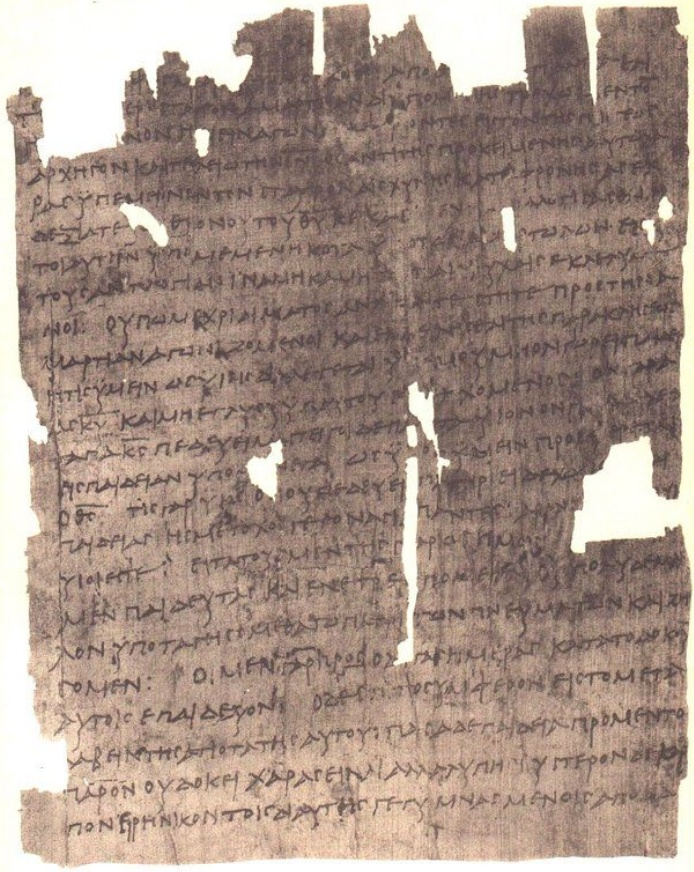
British Library
Papyrus 1532

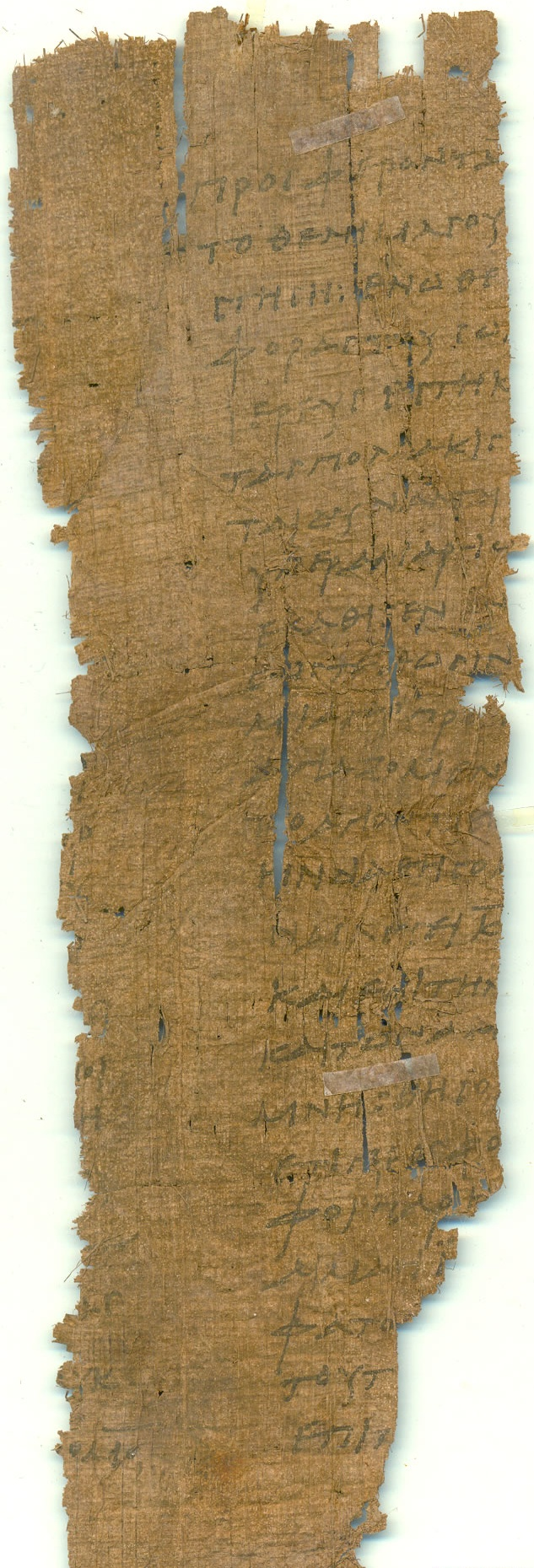
Cairo Egyptian Museum
PSI 1292

== See also ==
- List of New Testament papyri
- Oxyrhynchus papyri
- Papyrus 1
- Papyrus 115
- Papyrus Oxyrhynchus 656
- Papyrus Oxyrhynchus 658
