= Hebrews 13 =

- ← chapter 12 James 1 →
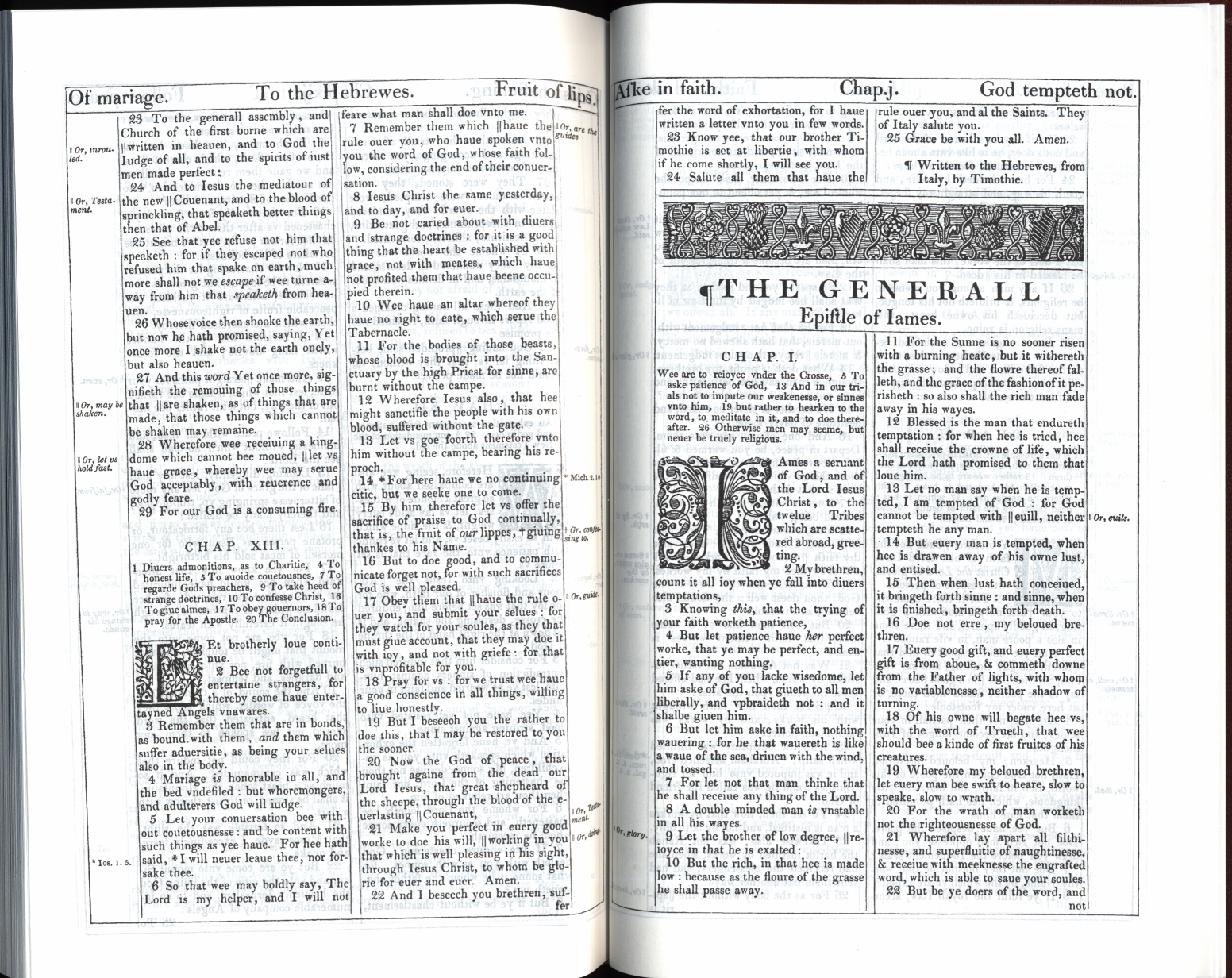
- The end of the Epistle to the Hebrews in the 1611 edition of the King James Bible
- Book: Epistle to the Hebrews
- Category: General epistles
- Christian Bible part: New Testament
- Order in the Christian part: 19

Hebrews 13 is the thirteenth (and the last) chapter of the Epistle to the Hebrews in the New Testament of the Christian Bible. The author is anonymous, although the internal reference to "our brother Timothy" (Hebrews 13:23) caused a traditional attribution to Paul. This attribution has been disputed since the second century, and there is no decisive evidence for the authorship. This closing chapter contains the author's concluding exhortations, final benediction and epistolary postscript.

== Text ==
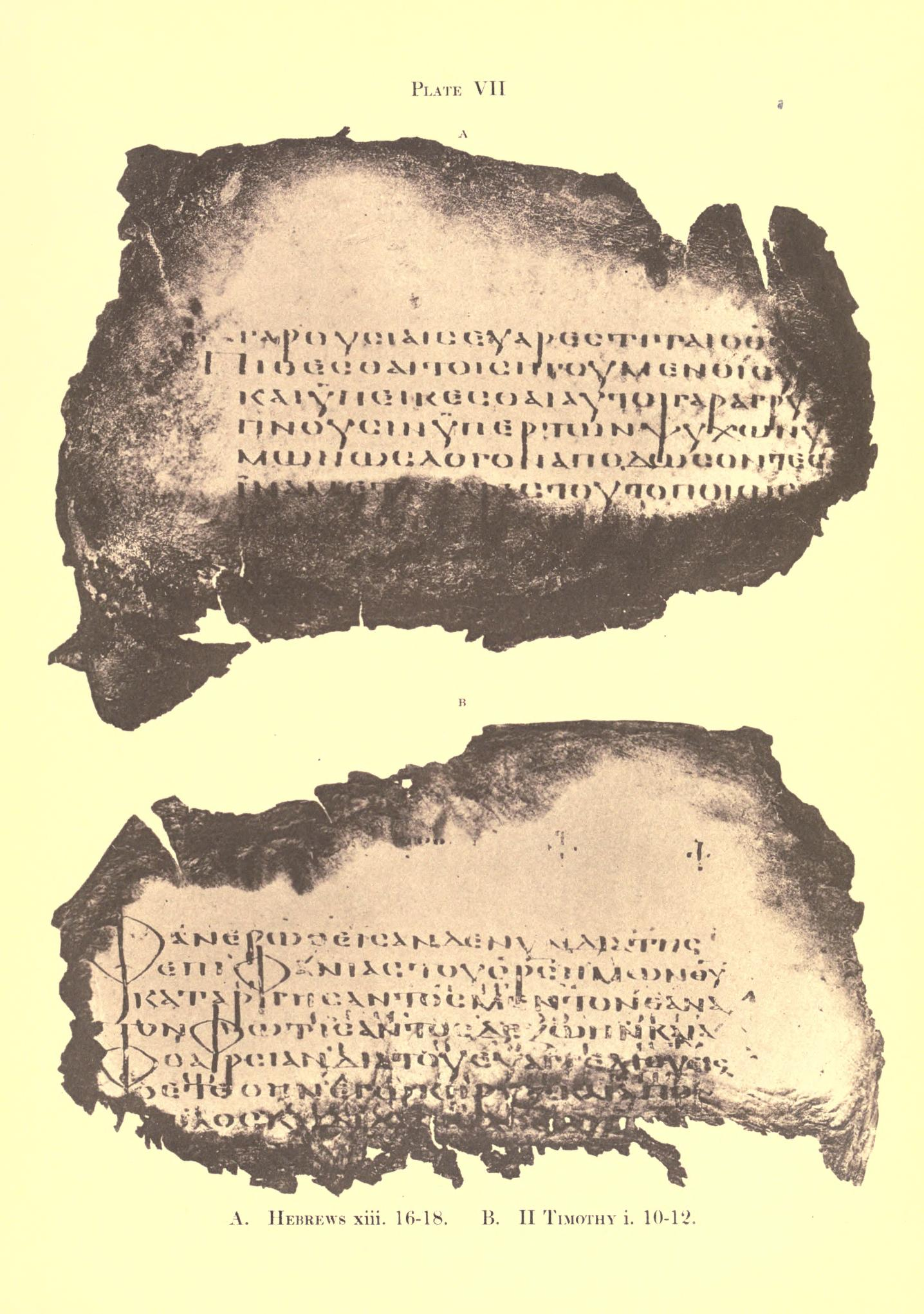
Some fragments of Codex Freerianus (c. AD 450): A. Hebrews 13:16–18; B. 2 Timothy 1:10–12 (AD 450)

The original text was written in Koine Greek. This chapter is divided into 25 verses.

=== Textual witnesses ===
Some early manuscripts containing the text of this chapter are:

- Papyrus 46 (c. 175–225; complete)
- Codex Vaticanus (325-350)
- Codex Sinaiticus (330-360)
- Papyrus 126 (4th century; extant verses 12–13, 19–20)
- Codex Alexandrinus (400-440)
- Codex Ephraemi Rescriptus (c. 450; complete)
- Codex Freerianus (~450; extant verses 7–9, 16–18, 23–25)
- Codex Claromontanus (~550)
- Codex Coislinianus (c. 550; extant verses 24–25)

=== Old Testament references ===
- Hebrews 13:5: Deuteronomy 31:6, 8; Joshua 1:5
- Hebrews 13:6: Psalm 118:6
- Hebrews 13:14: Micah 2:10

== Concluding exhortations (verses 1–17) ==
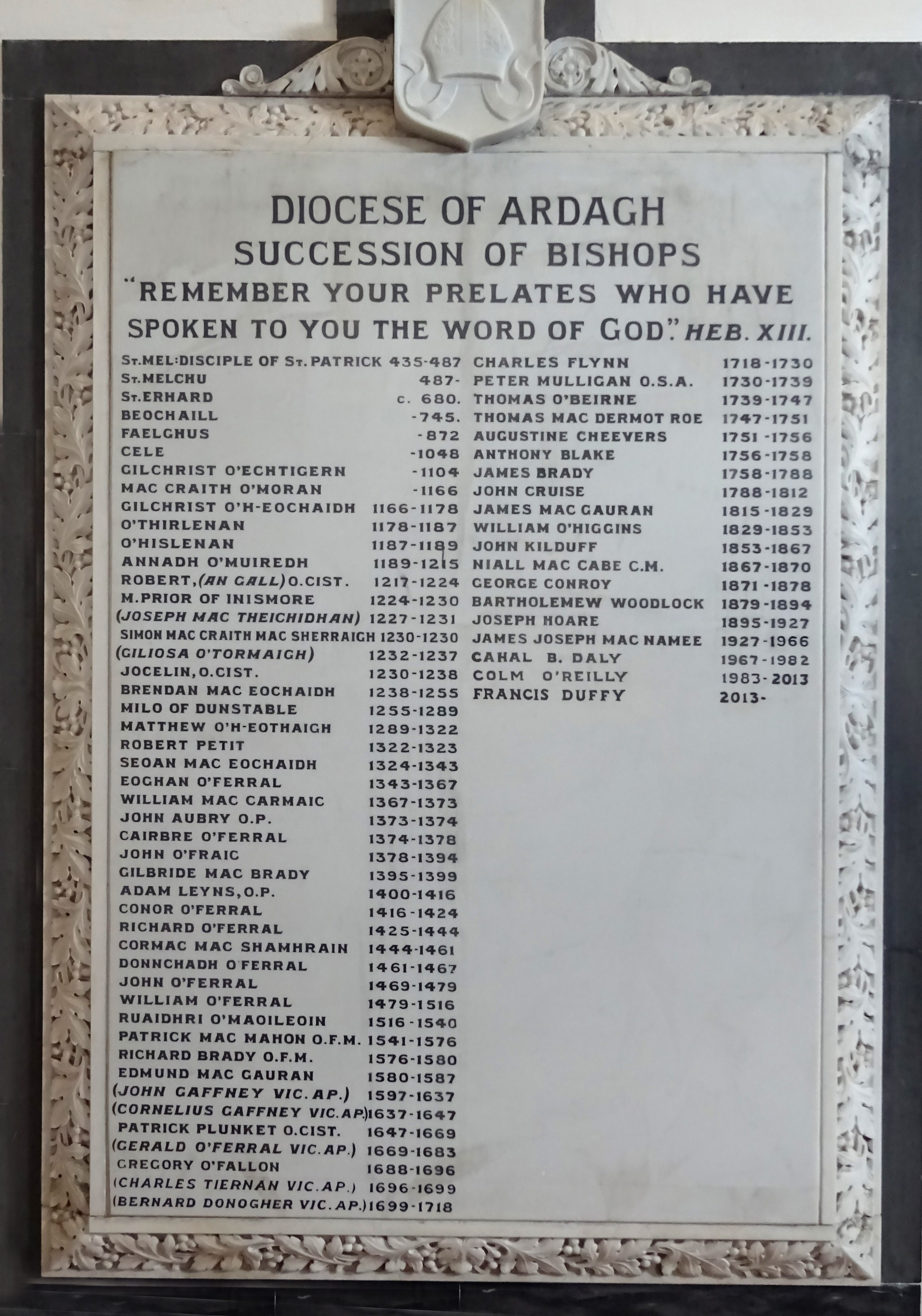
List of the Bishops of Ardagh, St Mel's Cathedral, Ireland. It features a quote from Hebrews 13:7; the Greek ἡγουμένων (hēgoumenōn, "your leaders") is translated as "prelates".

=== Verse 2 ===
Do not neglect to show hospitality to strangers, for thereby some have entertained angels unawares.

These words inspired Timothy Schmalz' sculpture Angels Unawares (2019), located in St. Peter's Square in the Vatican.

== Benediction and epistolary postscript (verses 18–25) ==
=== Verse 23 ===
Know that our brother Timothy has been set free, with whom I shall see you if he comes shortly.

- "Timothy": Paul's companion mentioned several times in the New Testament, such as in Acts 16–17, 1 Timothy, 2 Timothy, and is known by the recipients of this letter.
- "Set free": can also rendered as "set at liberty" or "dismissed" either from his current duty (sent by the apostle Paul), or released from prison.

== See also ==
- Angels Unawares
- Italy
- Jerusalem
- Jesus Christ
- Timothy
- Related Bible parts: Joshua 1, Psalm 102, Psalm 118, John 19

== Bibliography ==
- Attridge, Harold W. (2007). "75. Hebrews". In Barton, John; Muddiman, John (eds.). The Oxford Bible Commentary (first (paperback) ed.). Oxford University Press. pp. 1236–1254. ISBN 978-0199277186.
- deSilva, David A. (2005). "Hebrews". In Evans, Craig A. (ed.). Bible Knowledge Background Commentary: John's Gospel, Hebrews-Revelation. The Bible Knowledge Series (illustrated ed.). Colorado Springs, Colo.: Victor. pp. 199–256. ISBN 9780781442282.
