= Harold W. Attridge =

American New Testament scholar and historian (born 1946)

- Born: Harold William Attridge; November 24, 1946 (age 79)
- Title: Dean of Yale Divinity School (2002–2012)
- Spouse: Jan Farren

Academic background
- Education: Boston College; University of Cambridge; Harvard University
- Thesis: The Presentation of Biblical History in the "Antiquitates Judaicae" of Flavius Josephus (1975)

Academic work
- Discipline: Biblical studies History of Christianity
- Sub-discipline: New Testament studies History of early Christianity
- Institutions: Southern Methodist University; University of Notre Dame; Yale University
- Doctoral students: Andrew McGowan

Harold William Attridge (born November 24, 1946) is an American New Testament scholar and historian of Christianity best known for his work in New Testament exegesis, especially the Epistle to the Hebrews, the study of Hellenistic Judaism, and the history of early Christianity. He is a Sterling Professor of Divinity at Yale University, where he served as Dean of the Divinity School from 2002 to 2012.

== Education and career ==
Attridge received a Bachelor of Arts degree from Boston College (1967), Bachelor of Arts and Master of Arts degrees from the University of Cambridge (1969, 1973), which he attended as a Marshall Scholar, and a Doctor of Philosophy degree from Harvard University (1974). He also studied at Hebrew University of Jerusalem in 1972–73.

After a three-year term in the Harvard Society of Fellows, Attridge taught at Perkins School of Theology at Southern Methodist University (1977–1985) and the University of Notre Dame (1985–1997), where he also served as the Dean of the College of Arts and Letters. In 1997 he moved to Yale Divinity School, where he was named the Lillian Claus Professor of New Testament. He was Dean of the Divinity School from 2002 to 2012, the first Catholic in the role. He later returned to his position as a Sterling Professor.

Attridge was president of the Society of Biblical Literature in 2001 and of the Catholic Biblical Association in 2011–2012. He serves on multiple editorial boards and was a fellow of the Jesus Seminar. In 2015, he was elected to the American Academy of Arts & Sciences. Yale Divinity School has established a named scholarship fund in honor of Attridge and his wife, Janice.

== Selected works ==
=== Books ===
- Attridge, Harold W.; Oden, Robert A. (1976). The Syrian goddess (De Dea Syria) attributed to Lucian. Missoula, MT: Scholars Press. ISBN 9780891300731. OCLC 2005876.
- ——— (1976). The Interpretation of Biblical History in the Antiquitates Judaicae of Flavius Josephus. Harvard dissertations in religion. Vol. 7. Missoula, MT: Scholars Press. ISBN 9780891300816. OCLC 2372776.
- ——— (1976). First-century Cynicism in the Epistles of Heraclitus. Harvard theological studies. Vol. 29. Missoula, MT: Scholars Press. ISBN 9780891301110. OCLC 2318380.
- ———; Oden, Robert A. (1981). Philo of Byblos, The Phoenician History: introduction, critical text, transl., notes. The Catholic biblical quarterly - Monograph series. Washington, DC: Cath. Biblical Assoc. of America. ISBN 9780915170081. OCLC 630951999.
- ——— (1989). Hebrews: A Commentary on the Epistle to the Hebrews. Hermeneia--a critical and historical commentary on the Bible. Philadelphia, PA: Fortress Press. ISBN 9780800660215. OCLC 19612804.
- ——— (2010). The Acts of Thomas. Early Christian Apocrypha. Vol. 3. Salem, OR: Polebridge Press. ISBN 9781598150216. OCLC 613994200.
- ——— (2010). Essays on John and Hebrews. Wissenschaftliche Untersuchungen zum Neuen Testament. Vol. 264. Tübingen: Mohr Siebeck. ISBN 9783161503191. OCLC 897203099.

=== Edited by ===
- ———; Kraft, Robert A., eds. (1974). The Testament of Job: according to the SV text. Missoula, MT: Scholars Press. ISBN 9780884140443. OCLC 715745473.
- ———; Pietersma, Albert; Comstock, Susan Turner, eds. (1981). The Apocalypse of Elijah: Based on P. Chester Beatty 2018. Texts and translations; Pseudigraphia. Atlanta, GA: Scholars Press. ISBN 9780891303718. OCLC 246073902.
- ———, ed. (1985). Nag Hammadi Codex I (The Jung Codex): introductions, texts, translations, indices. Nag Hammadi studies. Vol. 22. Leiden: E. J. Brill. OCLC 715623045.
- ———; Collins, John J.; Tobin, Thomas H., eds. (1990). Of Scribes and Scrolls: Studies on the Hebrew Bible, Intertestamental Judaism, and Christian Origins. Resources in religion. Vol. 5. Lanham, MD: University Press of America. ISBN 9780819179029. OCLC 21975793.
- ———; Hata, Gōhei, eds. (1992). Eusebius, Christianity, and Judaism. Studia post Biblica. Vol. 42. Detroit, IL: Wayne State University Press. ISBN 9780814323618. OCLC 25315540.
- ———; Fassler, Margot Elsbeth, eds. (2003). Psalms in Community: Jewish and Christian Textual, Liturgical, and Artistic Traditions. Society of Biblical Literature - Symposium series. Vol. 25. Atlanta, GA: Society of Biblical Literature. ISBN 9781589830783. OCLC 53097123.
- ———; Meeks, Wayne A., eds. (2006). The HarperCollins Study Bible: New Revised Standard Version, including the Apocryphal/Deuterocanonical books with concordance (Fully revised & updated ed.). San Francisco, CA: HarperSanFrancisco. ISBN 9780060786854. OCLC 70998750.
- ———; Zangenberg, Jurgen; Martin, Dale B., eds. (2007). Religion, Ethnicity, and Identity in Ancient Galilee: A Region in Transition. Wissenschaftliche Untersuchungen zum Neuen Testament. Vol. 210. Tübingen: Mohr Siebeck. ISBN 9783161490446. OCLC 851292686.
- ———; Numbers, Ronald L.; Thomson, Keith Stewart, eds. (2009). The Religion and Science Debate: why does it continue?. Terry lectures. New Haven: Yale University Press. ISBN 9780300165005. OCLC 858861853.

=== Chapters ===
- ———; MacRae, George W. (1985). "Gospel of Truth: introduction and textual notes". In ——— (ed.). Nag Hammadi Codex I (The Jung Codex): introductions, texts, translations, indices. Nag Hammadi studies. Vol. 22. Leiden: E. J. Brill. pp. 55–118. OCLC 715623045.
- ———; Pagels, Elaine (1985). "Tripartite Tractate: introduction and textual notes". In ——— (ed.). Nag Hammadi Codex I (The Jung Codex): introductions, texts, translations, indices. Nag Hammadi studies. Vol. 22. Leiden: E. J. Brill. pp. 159–338. OCLC 715623045.
- ——— (1986). "The Gospel of Truth as an Esoteric Text". In Hedrick, Charles W.; Hodgson, Robert (eds.). Nag Hammadi, Gnosticism & Early Christianity. Peabody, MA: Hendrickson Publishers. pp. 239–56. ISBN 9780913573167. OCLC 19590601.
- ——— (1990). "The Original Language of the Acts of Thomas". In ———; Collins, John J.; Tobin, Thomas H. (eds.). Of Scribes and Scrolls: Studies on the Hebrew Bible, Intertestamental Judaism, and Christian Origins. Resources in religion. Vol. 5. Lanham, MD: University Press of America. pp. 241–50. ISBN 9780819179029. OCLC 21975793.

Academic offices
Preceded by Rebecca Chopp	Dean of Yale Divinity School; 2002–2012	Succeeded by Gregory E. Sterling
Professional and academic associations
Preceded by Adele Berlin	President of the Society of Biblical Literature; 2001	Succeeded by John J. Collins
