= Hand of God =

Hand of God may refer to:

== Arts and entertainment ==
=== Film and television ===
- Hand of God (film), a 2006 American documentary film
- Hand of God (TV series), an American television series
- The Hand of God (film), a 2021 Italian film
- "The Hand of God" (1978 Battlestar Galactica), a television episode
- "The Hand of God" (2004 Battlestar Galactica), a television episode

=== Music ===
- "Hand of God (Outro)", a song by Jon Bellion from the 2016 album The Human Condition
- "Hand of God", a song by Gang of Youths from the 2022 album Angel in Realtime
- "Hand of God", a song by Randy Stonehill from the 1998 album Thirst
- "Hand of God", a song by Soundgarden from the 1987 EP Screaming Life

=== Sports ===
- The hand of God, a controversial goal scored by Diego Maradona in the 1986 Argentina v England FIFA World Cup match
- (Le) Hand of God, a controversial goal in the second 2009 Republic of Ireland v France football match

=== Other uses in arts and entertainment ===
- The Hand of God (book), a 1996 autobiographical book by Bernard N. Nathanson
- The Hand of God (Carl Milles), a 1953 sculpture by Carl Milles located at Frank Murphy Hall of Justice in Detroit, Michigan

== Religion ==
- Hamsa, a palm-shaped protective amulet in Islamic and Jewish mysticism, also known as "(God's) helping hand"
- Hand of God (art), a motif in Jewish and Christian art
- Hands of God, a symbol in Slavic neopaganism

== Other uses ==
- Hand of God (Vindolanda), a bronze hand found at a Roman auxiliary fort
- PSR B1509-58, a pulsar whose surroundings resemble a hand, nicknamed the "Hand of God"

== See also ==
- Right hand of God, a biblical phrase
- Left Hand of God (disambiguation)
- God Hand (disambiguation)
- Finger of God (disambiguation)
