= Right hand of God =

Symbol of omnipotence of God

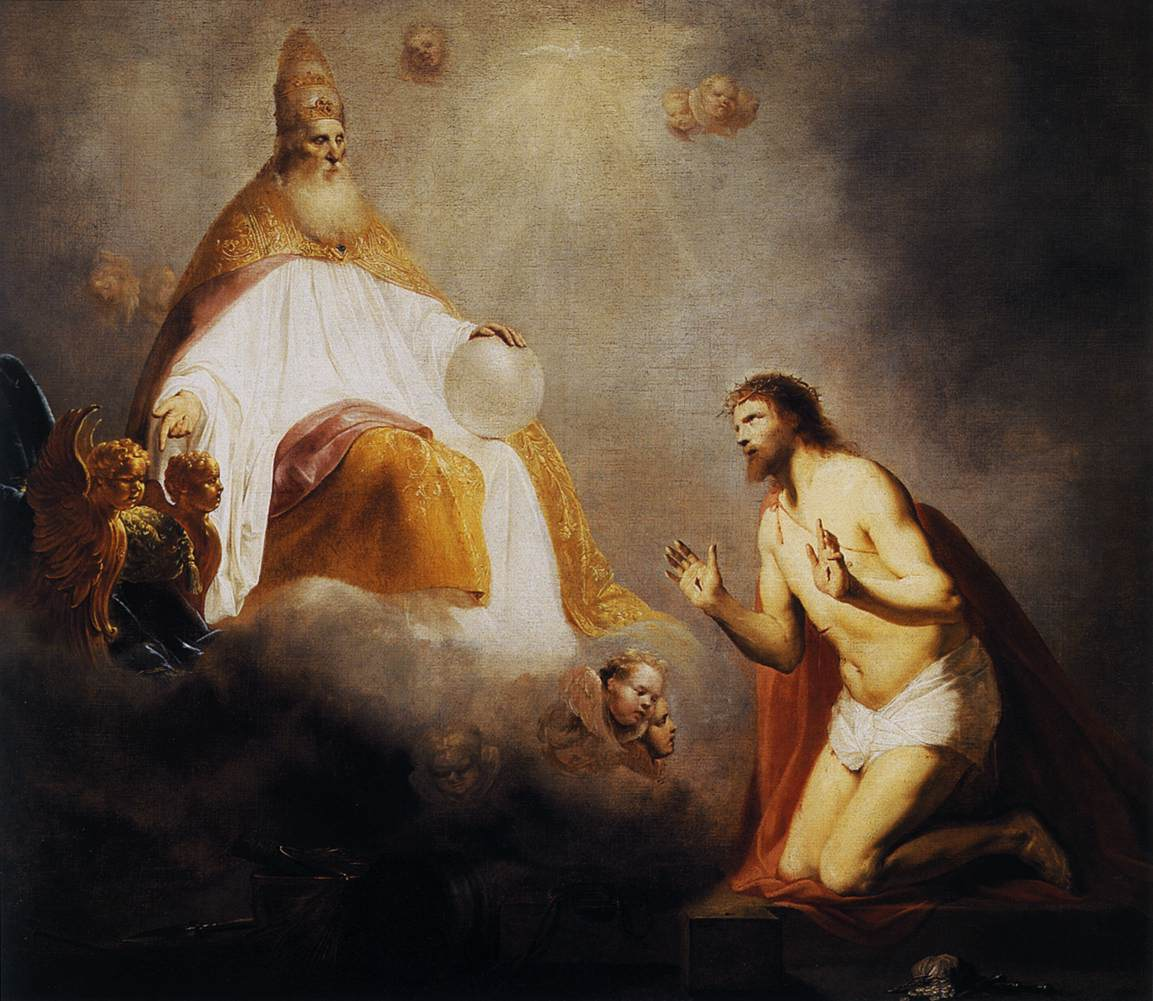
God Inviting Christ to Sit on the Throne at His Right Hand, painting by Pieter de Grebber (1645). The Holy Spirit is visible as a dove at the top of the image.

The right hand of God is a phrase used in the Bible and common speech as a metaphor for the omnipotence of God and as a motif in art. In the Bible, to be at the right side "is to be identified as being in the special place of honor". In "The Sheep and the Goats", one of the parables of Jesus, the sheep and goats are separated with the sheep on the right hand of God and the goats on the left hand.

It is also a placement next to God in Heaven, in the traditional place of honor, mentioned in the New Testament as the place of Christ at Mark 16:19, Luke 22:69, Matthew 22:44 and 26:64, Acts 2:34 and 7:55, 1 Peter 3:22 and elsewhere. These uses reflect use of the phrase in the Old Testament, for example in Psalms 63:8 and 110:1. The implications of this anthropomorphic phrasing have been discussed at length by theologians, including Saint Thomas Aquinas.

In Jewish and Christian iconography, especially of the Late Antique and Early Medieval periods, the "Hand of God" or the "Right Hand of God" is a motif used to indicate the intervention in or approval of affairs on Earth by God. It was used when artistic depictions of the God of Israel or God the Father as a full human figure were considered unacceptable.

== See also ==
- Act of God
- All-Seeing Eye of God
- Apostles' Creed
- Attributes of God in Christianity
- Cataphatic theology
- Divine countenance, the Face of God
- Finger of God (disambiguation)
- Hand of God (disambiguation)
- Left Hand of God (disambiguation)
- Session of Christ
- Throne of God
- Related biblical chapters: Psalm 63, Psalm 110, Isaiah 41, Matthew 22, Matthew 26, Mark 16, Luke 22, Acts 2, Acts 7, 1 Peter 3
