= Finger of God (disambiguation) =

Finger(s) of God or God's Finger may refer to:

- Finger of God, a biblical phrase used to explain the creation of the Ten Commandments

== Astronomy and cosmology ==
- Finger of God (Carina), a nebula
- Fingers of God, a type of effect involving galaxy clusters
- Finger of God (Cygnus), also known as the Witch's Broom Nebula

== Geography and geology ==
- El Dedo de Dios in Spain
- Mukurob in Namibia
- God's Finger Rock at Serra dos Órgãos in Brazil

== Other uses ==
- Yod (astrology), sometimes called the "Finger of God", a astrological aspect said to indicate struggles in a person's life
- A maximum-rated (F5/EF5) tornado on the Enhanced Fujita scale. Popularized by the 1996 film Twister

== See also ==
- Hand of God (disambiguation)
