= Yod =

Yod or YOD may refer to:

== Language ==
- Yod (sound), the /j/ glide - the sound of the letter 'i' in the word view
- Yodh, the tenth letter of many Semitic alphabets

== People ==
- Father Yod (1922–1975), American esoteric spiritual leader and restaurateur
- Leslie Daiken (1912–1964; nicknamed Yod), Irish writer, editor and activist
- Your Old Droog, Ukrainian-born American rapper and producer

== Other uses ==
- Yod (astrology), an aspect formation
- CFB Cold Lake, a Royal Canadian Air Force base in Alberta (IATA code: YOD)
- Year of the Dolphin, a 2007 United Nations Environment Programme observance
- Yods, characters in the 1999 Outcast video game

== See also ==
- Ecstatic Yod, a record label run by music critic Byron Coley
- Yad, the Jewish religious pointing device
- Yod-dropping and yod-coalescence, sound changes in English
