= Left Hand of God =

The Left Hand of God may refer to:

- The Left Hand of God (Lerner book), a 2006 book by Rabbi Michael Lerner
- The Left Hand of God (novel), a 2010 novel by Paul Hoffman
- The Left Hand of God, a 1951 novel by William Edmund Barrett
  - The Left Hand of God, a 1955 film adaptation of the novel
- The Left Hand of God: A Biography of the Holy Spirit, a 1998 book by Adolf Holl
- Gabriel, an archangel standing at the left hand of God
- Attachai Fairtex (born 1980), also known as the "Right Hand from God", Thai Muay Thai practitioner
- Sandy Koufax (born 1935), left-handed pitcher also known as "the Left Arm of God"

== See also ==
- Right hand of God, a metaphor for the omnipotence of God
- Hand of God (disambiguation)
