= God Hand (disambiguation) =

God Hand is a 2006 video game.

God hand or God's hand may also refer to:

- Gods Hand, a 2008 album by Axe Murder Boyz
- CG 4, a star-forming region commonly referred to as "God's Hand"
- God Hand, a character class in Dragon Quest VII
- Ken "Godhand" Mishima, a character in Ehrgeiz
- God's Hand, a 2015 album by Hot Sugar
- The God Hand, characters in Berserk
- God Hand, 2019 studio album by Brand of Sacrifice

== See also ==
- Hand of God (disambiguation)
