= Hand of God (Vindolanda) =

The Hand of God is a bronze hand found at the Roman fort of Vindolanda, thought to be from the third century AD. It is unlikely that it was actually intended to represent the Hand of God motif.

== Archaeology ==
In April 2018, a five-year archaeological research excavation began at the Roman fort Vindolanda in Northern England, south of Hadrian's Wall and near Bardon Mill in Northumberland.

The archaeological team from the Vindolanda Trust, along with volunteers, were exploring the Severan period (circa 208-212 AD) of the area known for rebellion against Roman rule. This period was rife with violence and genocide against the local citizenry.

A few weeks into the excavation, a bronze hand, the size of a child's right hand, was found approximately 1.5 meters under a Severan ditch and several meters behind a temple dedicated to Jupiter Dolichenus. The Roman military particularly loved the god, and the hand would have been deposited in the bog ditch in celebration of the finished nearby temple.

== Description ==
The hand, solid bronze and about 10cm long, is very detailed and looks very lifelike. It originally had something attached to the palm, but it has been lost. The end of the hand is socketed and would have been attached to a pole and used to bless worshippers.

Some believe that the hand would have been holding a small effigy of Jupiter Dolichenus, possibly riding a bull and holding an axe and lightning bolt as the god is known to be depicted. However, this is mere supposition, and it is not definitively known what the hand held in its palm.

The Hand of God, as it became known, is on permanent display at the Vindolanda Museum.

== External Websites ==
- Vindolanda Charitable Trust
- Hadrian's Wall in Vindolanda
- Deo Mercurio
