= Face of God (disambiguation) =

The divine countenance is a concept in the Abrahamic religions.

Face of God or The Face of God may also refer to:

- Face of God, an album by Holiday Sidewinder, 2021
- "Face of God", a song by Billy Ray Cyrus from The Other Side, 2003
- "Face of God", a song by the Drums from Encyclopedia, 2014
- The Face of God, unproduced story from Doctor Who (series 3)
