= Hand of God (film) =

- Directed by: Joe Cultrera
- Edited by: Joe Cultrera
- Release date: 2006
- Country: United States
- Language: English

Hand of God is a 2006 independent documentary that was acquired for national airing in the United States by Frontline. The film was directed and edited by Joe Cultrera and tells the story of how his brother Paul was molested in the 1960s by their parish priest, Father Joseph Birmingham, who allegedly abused nearly 100 other children. Cultrera tells the story of faith betrayed and how his brother Paul and the rest of the Cultrera family fought back against a scandal that continues to afflict churches across the country.

== Background ==
The Cultrera brothers were raised in an Italian-Catholic family in Salem, Massachusetts, and attended Catholic school from kindergarten through high school. From an early age they were immersed in the beliefs and teachings of the Catholic Church.

At 14, Paul, an altar boy at St. James Parish, came under the guidance of Fr. Birmingham. Birmingham was young and friendly, often taking the boys on trips and inviting them to the rectory for Friday and Saturday night pizza parties. It was during confession that Paul's relationship with Birmingham changed. Confessing to masturbation led to private "counseling" sessions at the rectory, where Paul was sexually abused. Birmingham also abused him during nighttime rides in Birmingham's black Ford Galaxie and on trips out of town.

Paul kept this secret for nearly 30 years, until he decided to finally confront the Church and launch his own investigation into whether the Archdiocese of Boston had covered up allegations against Birmingham, moving him from parish to parish and placing more children in danger.

Paul began to place advertisements in the newspapers of the various towns where Birmingham had been posted, asking the simple question, "Do You Remember Father Birmingham?" The responses he received were an indication that he was certainly not Birmingham's only victim.

== See also ==
- Roman Catholic sex abuse cases
- Roman Catholic priests accused of sex offenses
- Crimen sollicitationis
- Pontifical Secret
- Sex Crimes and the Vatican (Panorama Documentary Episode)
- Deliver Us from Evil (2006 film)
- Twist of Faith
- Barbara Blaine
- Survivors Network for those Abused by Priests
