= Hand of God (art) =

Jewish and Christian motif signifying divine intervention

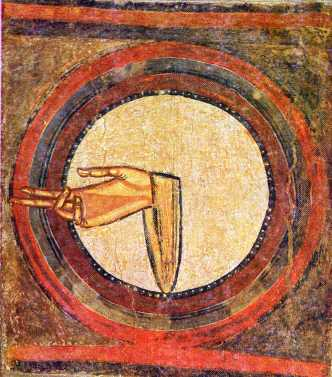
The hand as an isolated motif. Fresco from Sant Climent de Taüll, Catalonia, Spain.

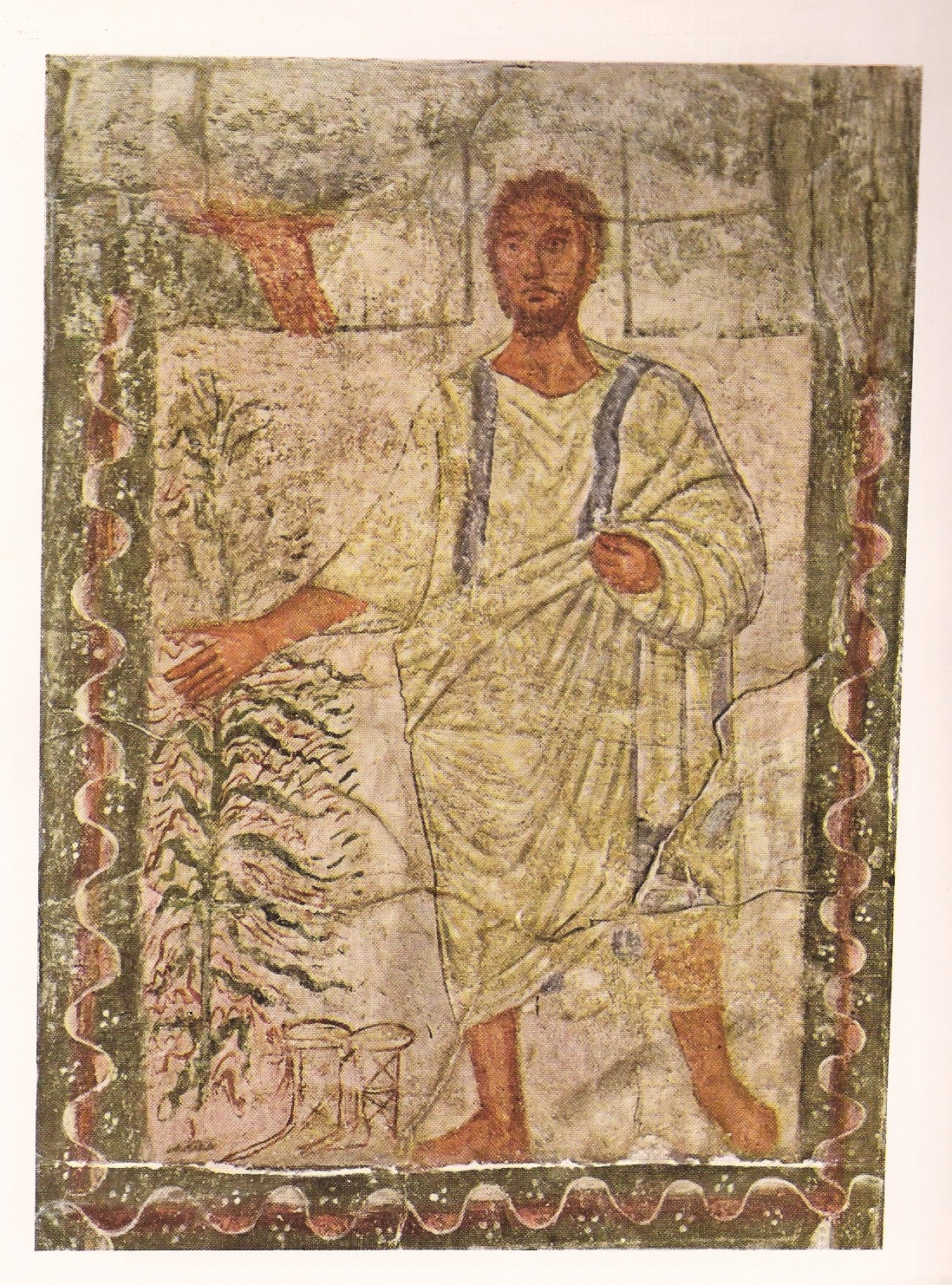
Moses and the Burning Bush wing panel, Dura Europos Synagogue

The Hand of God, or Manus Dei in Latin, also known as Dextera domini/dei (the "right hand of God"), is a motif in Jewish and Christian art, especially of the Late Antique and Early Medieval periods, when depiction of Yahweh or God the Father as a full human figure was considered unacceptable. The hand, sometimes including a portion of an arm, or ending about the wrist, is used to indicate the intervention in or approval of affairs on Earth by God, and sometimes as a subject in itself. It is an artistic metaphor that is generally not intended to indicate that a hand was physically present or seen at any subject depicted. The Hand is seen appearing from above in a fairly restricted number of narrative contexts, often in a blessing gesture (in Christian examples), but sometimes performing an action. In later Christian works it tends to be replaced by a fully realized figure of God the Father, whose depiction had become acceptable in Western Christianity, although not in Eastern Orthodox or Jewish art. Though the hand of God has traditionally been understood as a symbol for God's intervention or approval of human affairs, it is also possible that the hand of God reflects the anthropomorphic conceptions of the deity that may have persisted in late antiquity.

The largest group of Jewish imagery from the ancient world, the 3rd century synagogue at Dura-Europos, has the hand of God in five different scenes, including the Sacrifice of Isaac, and no doubt this was one of the many iconographic features taken over by Christian art from what seems to have been a vigorous tradition of Jewish narrative art. Here and elsewhere it often represents the bath Kol (literally "daughter of a voice") or voice of God, (Note: A matter disputed by some scholars) a use also taken over into Christian art.

The hand may also relate to older traditions in various other religions in the Ancient Near East. In the art of the Amarna period in Egypt under Akhenaten, the rays of the Aten sun-disk end in small hands to suggest the bounty of the supreme deity. Like the hamsa amulet, the hand is sometimes shown alone on buildings, although it does not seem to have existed as a portable amulet-type object in Christian use. It is found from the 4th century on in the Catacombs of Rome, including paintings of Moses receiving the Law and the Sacrifice of Isaac.

There are numerous references to the hand, or arm, of God in the Hebrew Bible, most clearly metaphorical in the way that remains current in modern English, but some capable of a literal interpretation. They are usually distinguished from references to a placement at the right hand of God. Later rabbinic literature also contains a number of references. There are three occasions in the gospels when the voice of God is heard, and the hand often represents this in visual art. Gertrud Schiller distinguishes three functions of the hand in Christian art: as symbol of either God's presence or the voice of God, or signifying God's acceptance of a sacrifice.

== In sacred texts and commentary ==
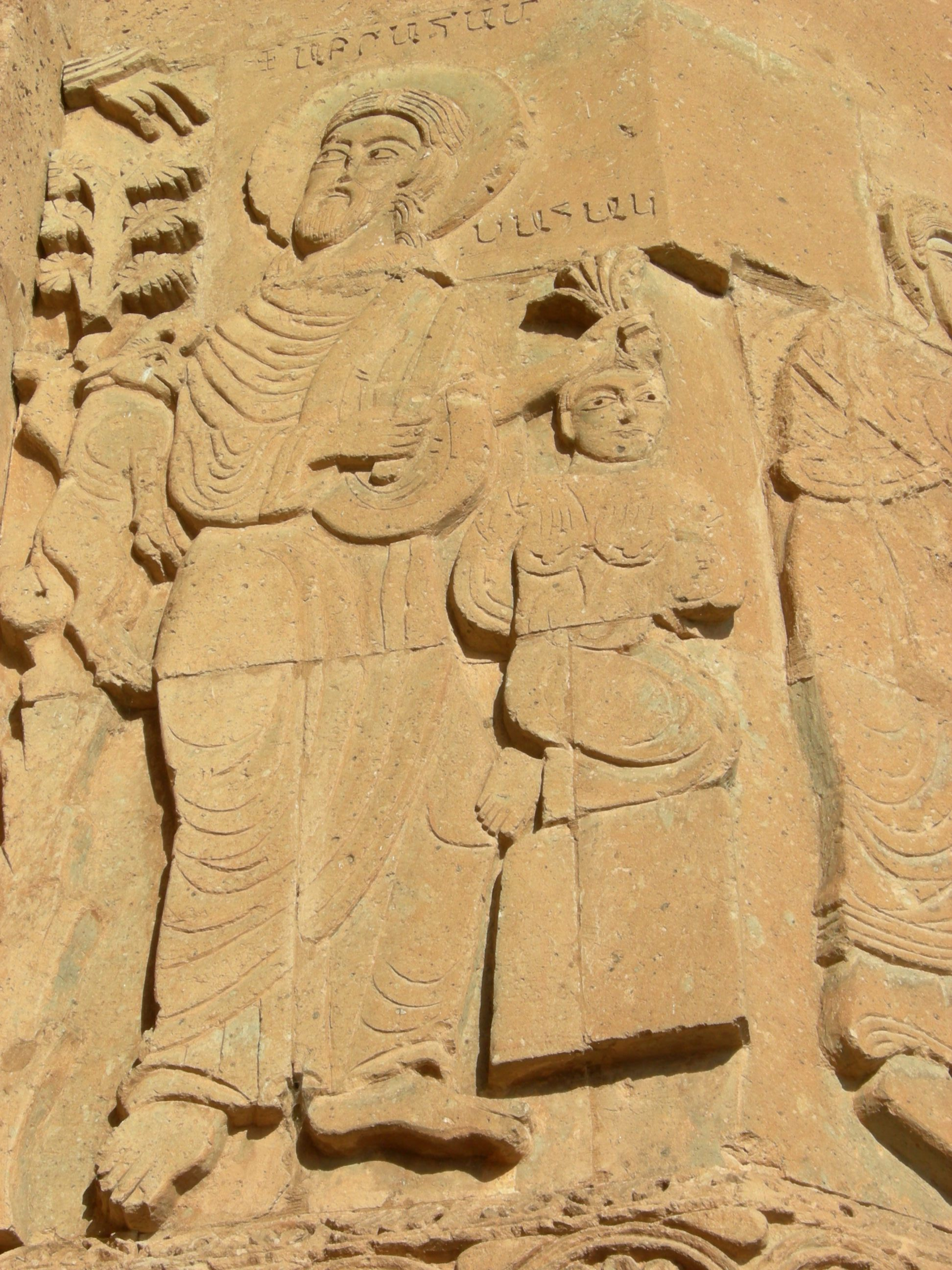
The Hand of God intervenes at the Sacrifice of Isaac, Armenian, Akdamar, 10th century

=== Hebrew Bible ===
The hand of God, which encompasses God's arm and fingers as well, is one of the most frequently employed anthropomorphisms of the Hebrew Bible. References to the hand of God occur numerous times in the Pentateuch alone, particularly in regards to the unfolding narrative of the Israelites' exodus from Egypt (cf. Exodus 3:19–20, Exodus 14: 3, 8, 31).

=== New Testament ===
There are no references to the hand of God as an active agent or witness in the New Testament, though there are several to Jesus standing or sitting by the right hand of God in God's heavenly court, a conventional term for the place of honour beside a host or senior family member. For example, when Stephen is filled with the "holy spirit" he looks to heaven and sees Jesus standing by the right hand of God (Acts 7:55). There are three occasions in the Gospels when the voice of God is heard, and the hand of God often represents this in visual art.

=== Rabbinic literature ===
Anthropomorphic aggadot regarding the hand of God appear frequently in the corpus of rabbinic literature and expand upon anthropomorphic biblical narratives.

== Christian art ==
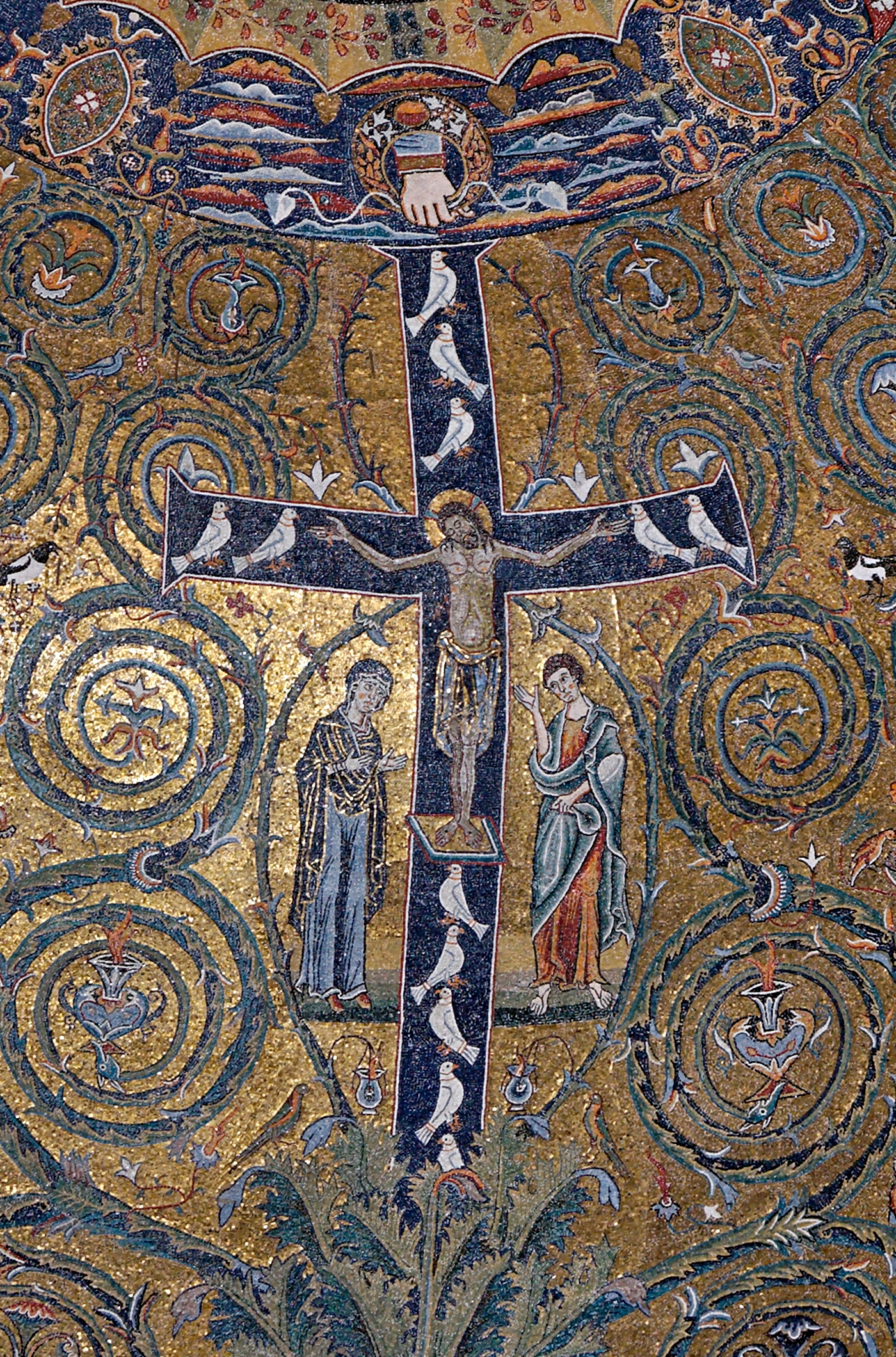
Clothed hand clutching wreath, San Clemente, Rome, 1140–43.

In Christian art, the hand of God has traditionally been understood as an artistic metaphor that is not intended to indicate that the deity was physically present or seen in any subject depicted. In the late antique and early medieval periods, the representation of the full-bodied figure of God the Father would have been considered a grave violation of the Second Commandment. According to conventional art historical interpretation, the representation of the hand of God in early Christian art thus developed as a necessary and symbolic compromise to the highly anti-anthropomorphic tenor of the Second Commandment, though anthropomorphic interpretations are certainly plausible.

In early Christian and Byzantine art, the hand of God is seen appearing from above in a fairly restricted number of narrative contexts, often in a blessing gesture, but sometimes performing an action. Gertrud Schiller distinguishes three functions of the hand in Christian art: as symbol of either God's presence or the voice of God, or signifying God's acceptance of a sacrifice. In later Christian works it tends to be replaced by a fully realized figure of God the Father, whose depiction had become acceptable in Western Christianity, although not in Eastern Orthodox or Jewish art.

=== Iconography ===
The Hand of Benediction gesture used in depictions of Jesus

The motif of the hand, with no body attached, provides a problem for the artist in how to terminate it. In Christian narrative images the hand most often emerges from a small cloud, at or near the top of the image, but in iconic contexts it may appear cut off in the picture space, or spring from a border, or a victor's wreath (left). A cloud is mentioned as the source of the voice of God in the gospel accounts of the Transfiguration of Jesus (see below). Several of the examples in the Dura Europos synagogue (see below) show a good part of the forearm as well as the hand, which is not found in surviving Christian examples, and most show an open palm, sometimes with the fingers spread out. Later examples in Jewish art are closer in form to Christian styles.

In Christian art, the hand of God usually occupies the form of a blessing gesture, if they are not performing an action, though some just show an open hand. The normal blessing gesture is to point with the index and next finger, with the other fingers curled back and thumb relaxed. There is also a more complicated Byzantine gesture that attempts to represent the Greek letter chi, Christ's initial, which looks like a Latin letter "X". This is formed by crossing the thumb and little finger inside the palm, with only the forefinger and next one extended, or a variant of this.

Especially in Roman mosaics, but also in some German imperial commissions, for example on the Lothair Cross, the hand is clenched around a wreath that goes upwards, and behind which the arm then disappears, forming a tidy circular motif. Especially in these examples, the hand may show the sleeve of a garment, sometimes of two layers, as at San Clemente, Rome. In blessing forms the hand often has a halo, which also may provide a convenient termination point. This may or may not be a cruciform halo, indicating the divinity, and specifically the Logos, or Pre-existing Christ (see below).

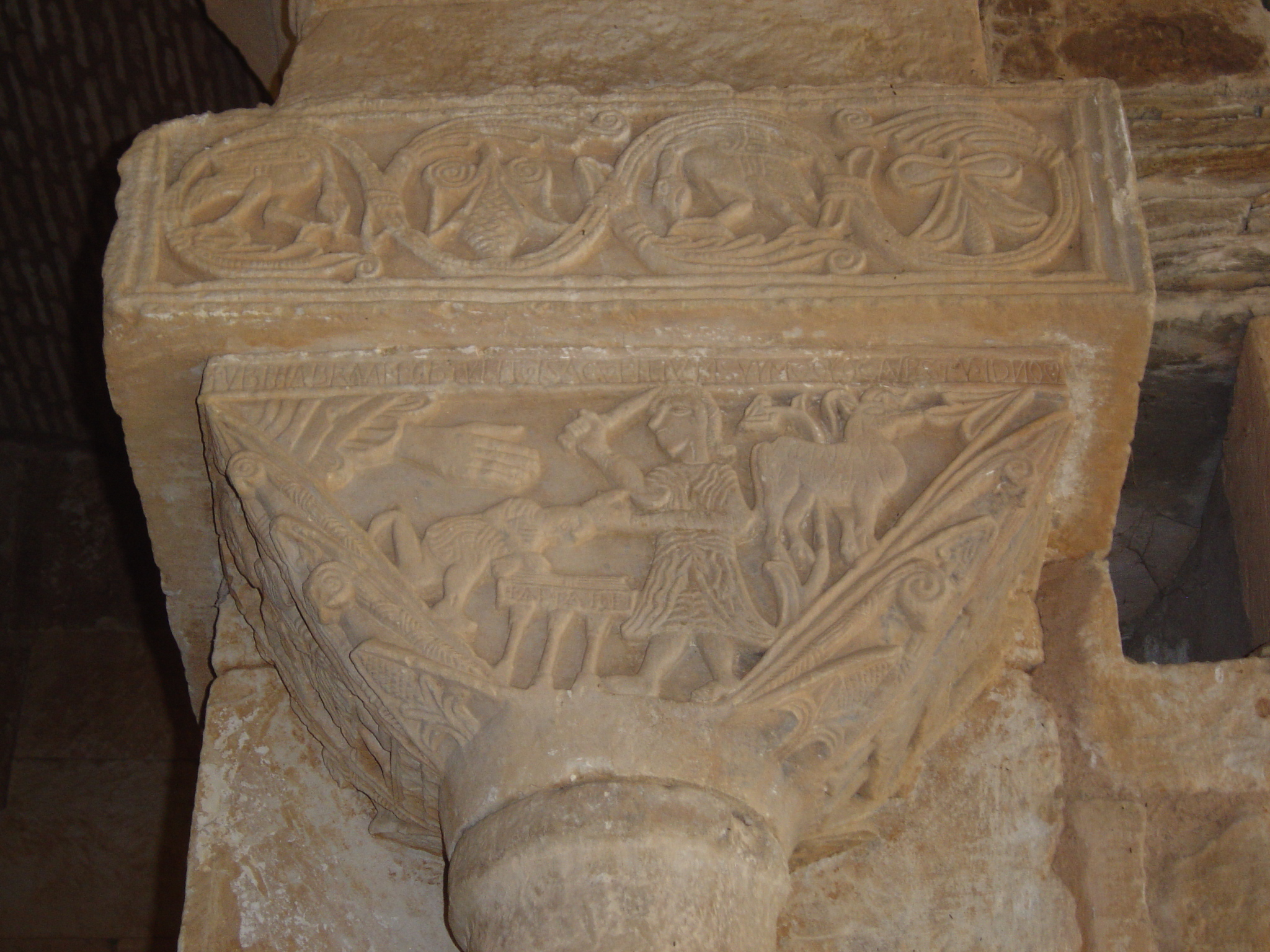
Visigothic capital with the Sacrifice of Isaac.

The hand is regularly seen in depictions of certain scenes, though it may occur on occasion in a much wider range. In many scenes one or more angels, acting as the messengers of God, may appear instead of the hand. A virtually unique mosaic depiction of the Ark of the Covenant (806) at Germigny-des-Prés, also features the hand of God.

In Christian art the hand will often actually represent the hand of God the Son, or the Logos; this is demonstrated when later depictions start to substitute for the Hand a small half-length portrait of Christ as Logos in a similar circular frame. It is nearly always Christ in the East, but in the West God the Father will sometimes be shown in this way. However, in many contexts the person of the Trinity intended cannot be confirmed from the image alone, except in those images, like the Baptism of Christ, where Jesus the Incarnate Christ is also present, where the hand is clearly that of God the Father. Later Eastern Orthodox images often identify Hands as the Logos with the usual monogram used in icons. (Note: For example in this icon, as compared to this one, which shows the Hand replaced with a Christ/Logos.)

==== Old Testament imagery ====
- In the Vienna Genesis the hand appears above the Expulsion of Adam and Eve from Paradise. More often, God was shown in this story using the conventional depiction of Jesus representing the pre-existent Christ or Logos, who was seen as the Creator by Early Christian writers, (Note: The account in Genesis naturally credits the Creation to the single figure of God, in Christian terms, God the Father. However the first person plural in Genesis 1:26 "And God said, Let us make man in our image, after our likeness", and New Testament references to Christ as creator (John 1:3, Colossians 1:15) led Early Christian writers to associate the Creation with the Logos.) The story of Adam and Eve was the Old Testament subject most frequently seen in Christian art that needed a pictorial representation of God. A well known modern variant of the traditional hand motif is a sculpture of 1898 by Auguste Rodin called the Hand of God, which shows a gigantic hand creating Adam and Eve.
- The Sacrifice of Isaac first appears in Christian art in 4th century depictions from the Roman catacombs and sarcophagi, as well as pieces like a fragment from a marble table from Cyprus. Abraham is restrained by the hand, which in the Sarcophagus of Junius Bassus grasped his knife hand, as the angel often does in other depictions. (Note: Though both hand and knife are now missing, with only a wrist stump now remaining.) However the angel mentioned in the biblical text is more usual, and often included as well. The use of the hand in this scene, at least in Christian art, indicates God's acceptance of the sacrifice, as well as his intervention to change it.

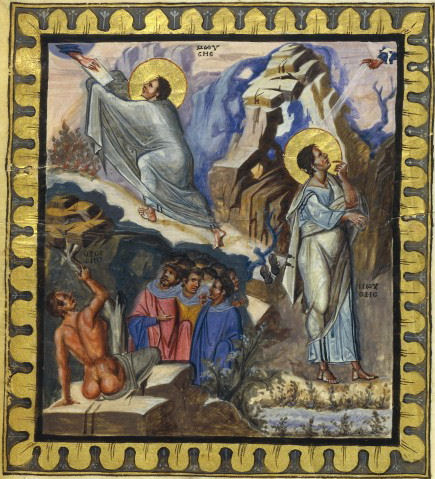
Moses receives the Tablets of the Law, and hears the call of God. Paris Psalter.

- Some depictions have the hand passing Moses the Tablets of the Law, found in the Roman catacombs, various Bibles (see gallery), the Paris Psalter, and in mosaic in the Basilica of San Vitale, Ravenna.
- The prophet Ezekiel (2:9–10) received his prophecy by hand: "Then I looked, and I saw a hand stretched out to me. In it was a scroll, which he unrolled before me. On both sides of it were written words of lament and mourning and woe" and this and other moments from Ezekiel sometimes include the hand. In the Paris Psalter, Moses, Jonah and Isaiah are all shown blessed by hands, from which rays of light come. Other prophets are sometimes also shown with the hand.
- In the Klosterneuburg Altar, Drogo Sacramentary (shown below) and San Vitale, Ravenna, Melchizedek is shown blessed by it, in the last combined with Abel. This relates to the approval of his sacrifice mentioned in the biblical text, and possibly also to the hand's association with divinely ordained monarchy (see below), as Melchizedek was both priest and king according to Genesis 14:18–20, and his appearance in art is often to evoke this as well as his function as a type for Christ.
- The hand can appear in other contexts; the Carolingian Utrecht Psalter atypically illustrates nearly all the Psalms, probably following an Antique model, and shows the hand in at least 27 of these images, despite also using a figure of Christ-as-God in the heavens even more frequently.
- A mosaic in the Mausoleum of Galla Placidia in Ravenna shows the battle of Beth-horon with the Amorites (Joshua, 10:11), where: "As they fled before Israel on the road down from Beth Horon to Azekah, the LORD hurled large hailstones down on them from the sky, and more of them died from the hailstones than were killed by the swords of the Israelites" – with a large hand representing God.
- The story in Daniel 5:1–31 of the writing on the wall is rarely depicted until the 17th century, when Rembrandt's well known version and others were produced.
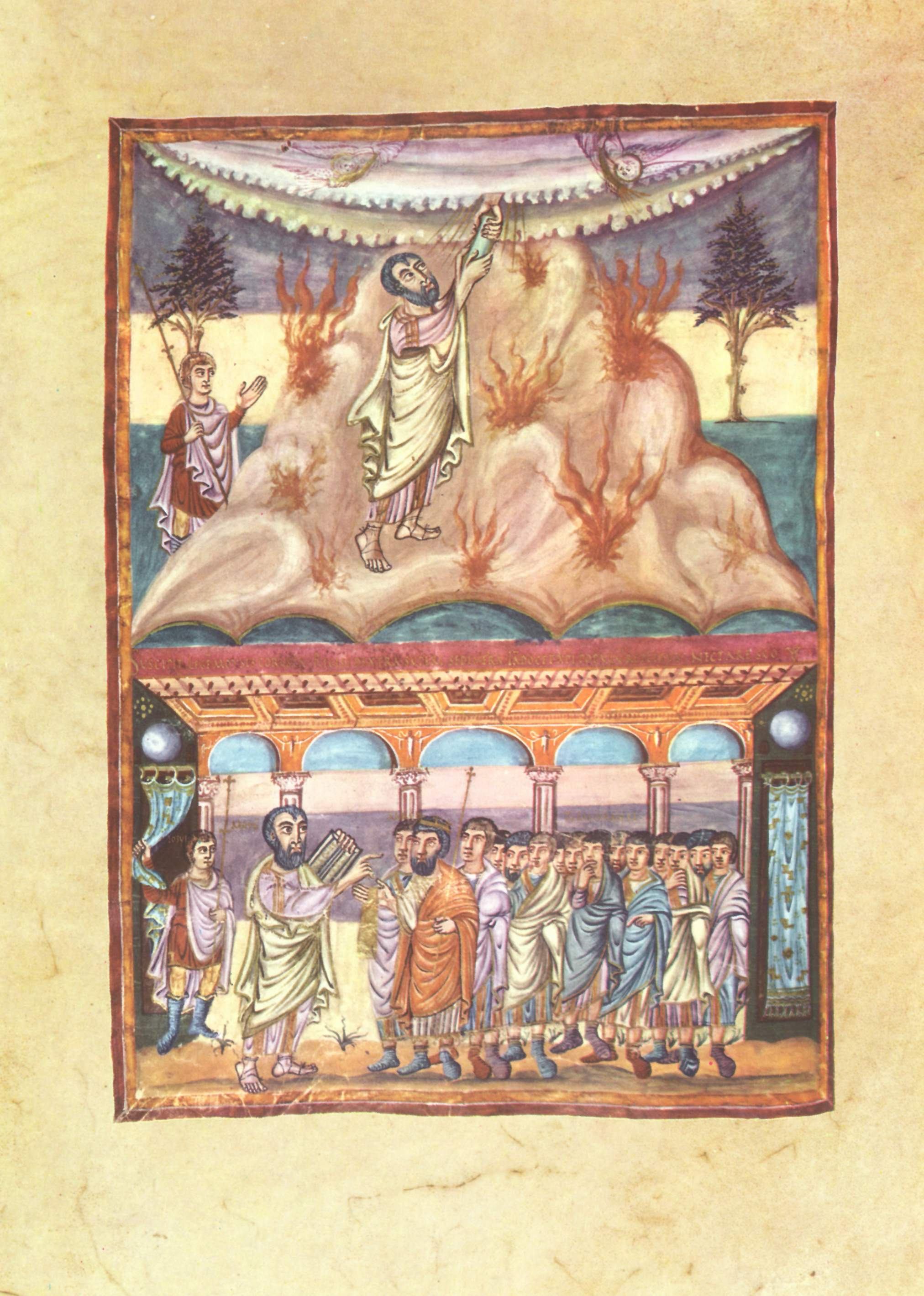
Moses receives the Tablets, c. 840

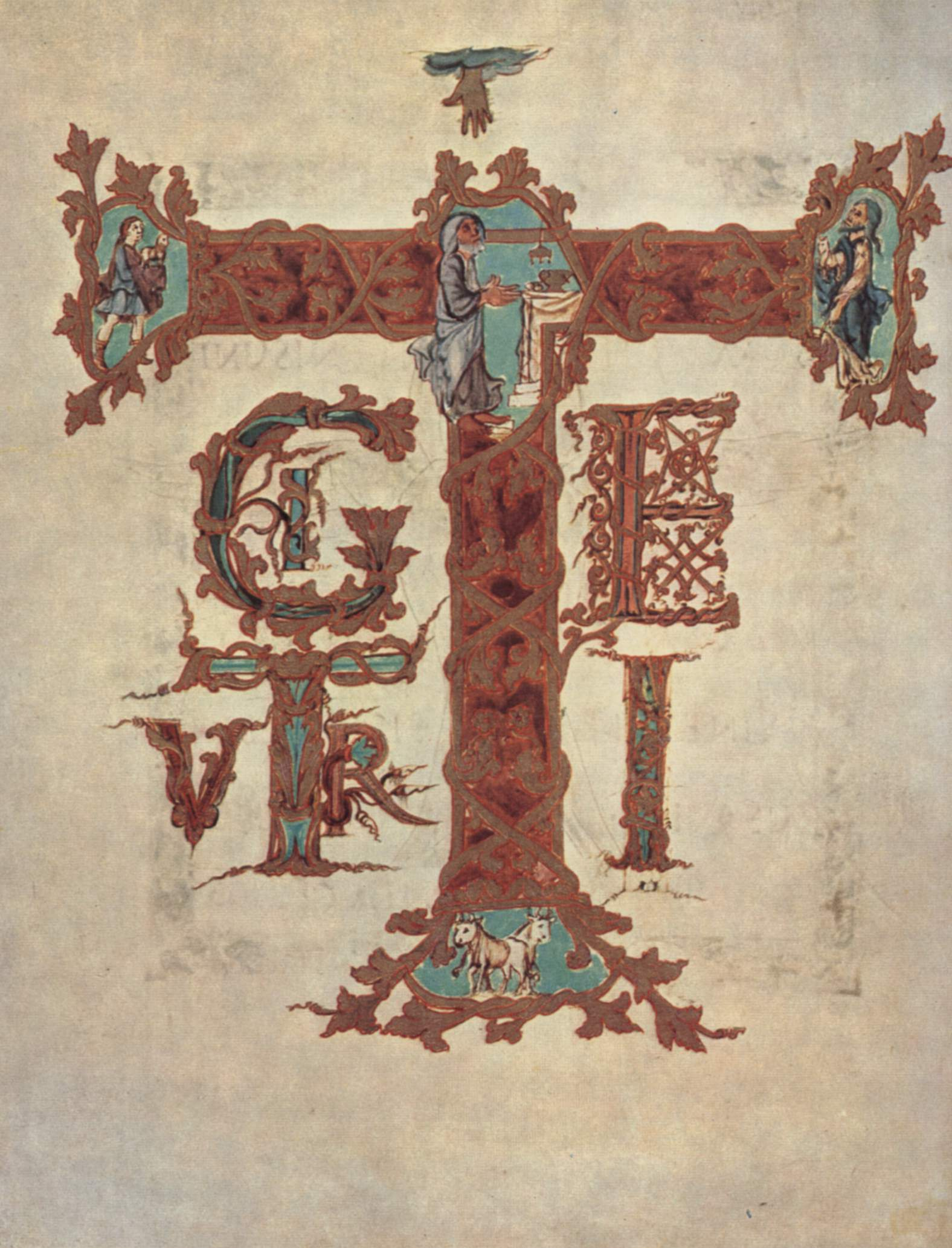
In the Drogo Sacramentary Melchizedek is shown blessed by the hand.

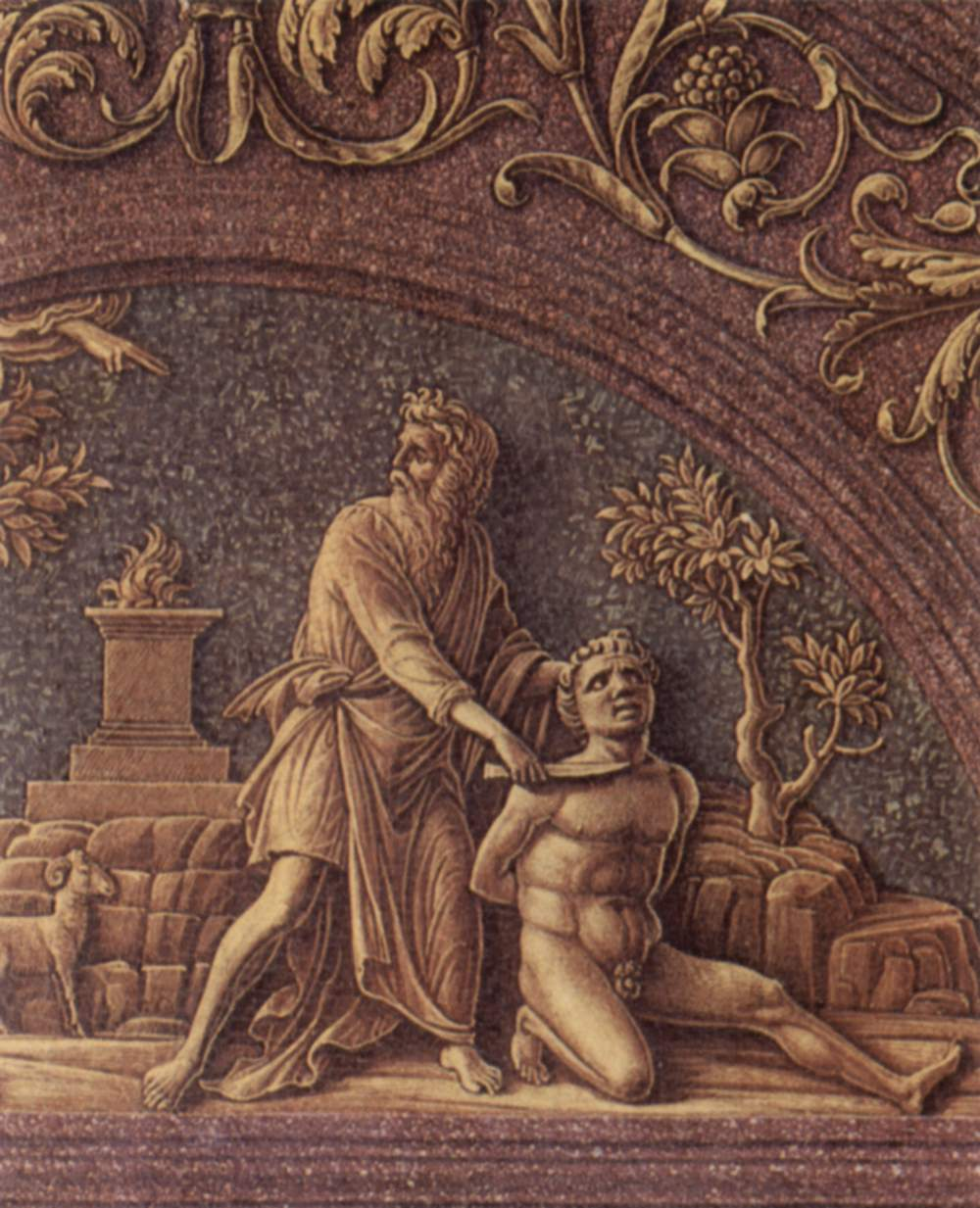
Andrea Mantegna, Sacrifice of Isaac

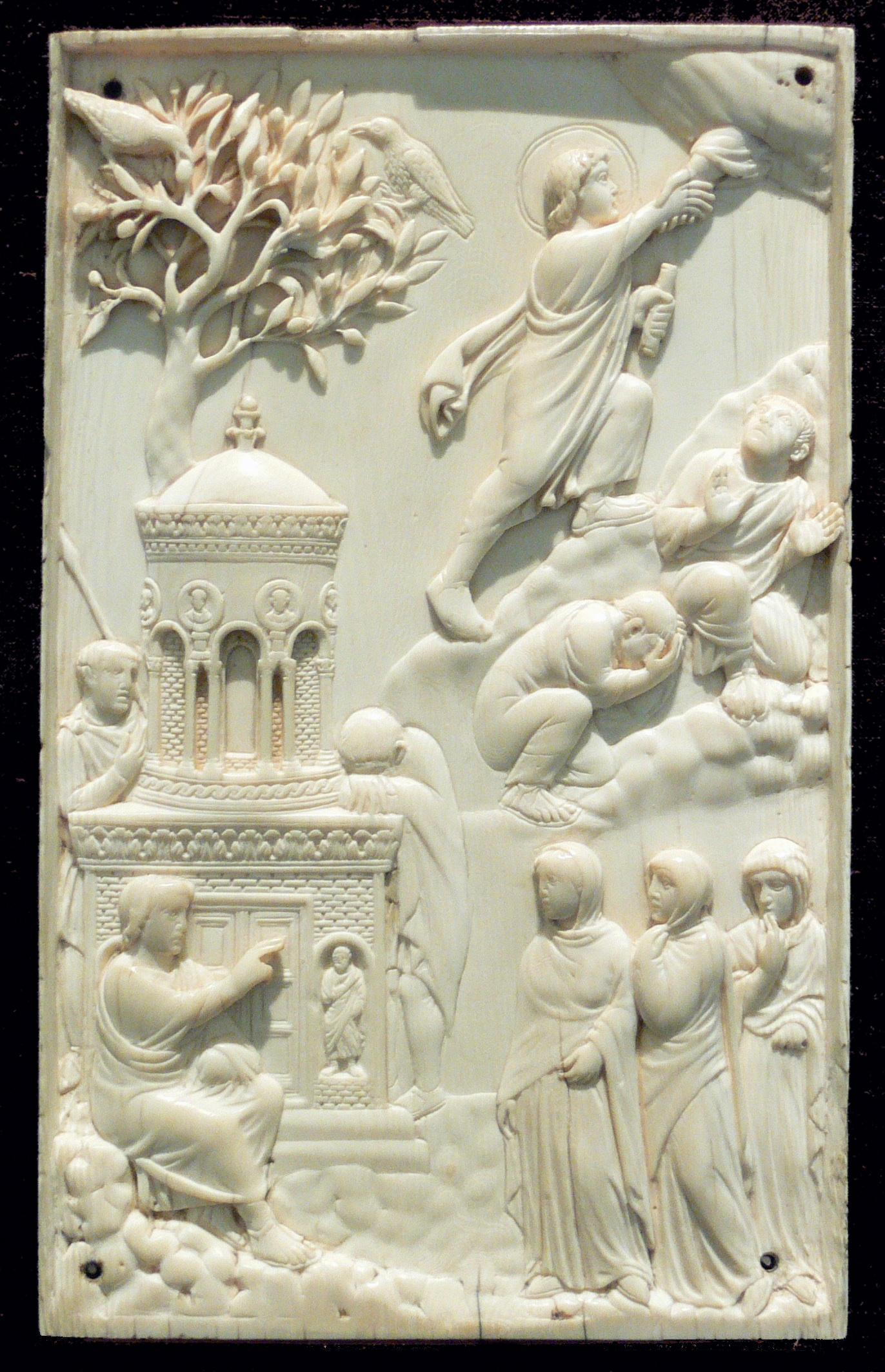
Ascension of Christ and Noli me tangere, c. 400, ivory. See below for a similar Ascension 450 years later.

==== New Testament imagery ====
- In depictions of the Life of Christ, the hand often appears at the Baptism of Christ representing the voice of God, above the dove representing the Holy Spirit, which is much more common, thus showing the whole Trinity as present and active. The hand never seems to appear without the dove, as the Holy Spirit as a dove is mentioned in the Gospel of Mark: "As soon as Jesus was baptized, he went up out of the water. At that moment heaven was opened, and he saw the Spirit of God descending like a dove and lighting on him. And a voice from heaven said, "This is my Son, whom I love; with him I am well pleased." Both dove and hand are normally located centrally, pointing straight down at Jesus. The hand is mostly found in Baptisms between the 6th (e.g. Rabbula Gospels) and 11th centuries.
- The hand is found in some Western and later Armenian scenes of the Transfiguration of Jesus, where again the Synoptic Gospels have the voice of God speaking, this time from a cloud.
- The hand is sometimes seen in the Agony in the Garden, though an angel is more common. This is the third and final occasion when the voice of God is mentioned in the gospels, this time only in the Gospel of John (12:28). The earliest known example is in the St Augustine Gospels of c.600.
- From Carolingian art until the Romanesque period, the hand may appear above the top of the cross in the Crucifixion of Jesus, pointing straight down. Sometimes it holds a wreath over Christ's head, as on the rear of the Ottonian Lothair Cross at Aachen Cathedral. The hand represents divine approval, and specifically acceptance of his sacrifice, and possibly also the storm mentioned in the gospels.
- The hand may be seen in the Ascension of Christ, sometimes, as in the Drogo Sacramentary, reaching down and clasping that of Christ, as though to pull him up into the clouds. The ivory plaque now in Munich (left) with such a depiction is possibly the earliest representation of the Ascension to survive.
- In Eastern Orthodox icons of the Last Judgement, the hand often holds the scales in which souls are weighed (in the West Saint Michael typically does this). The hand may emerge from the Hetoimasia usually present, and is typically huge in size compared to the full figures nearby in the composition.
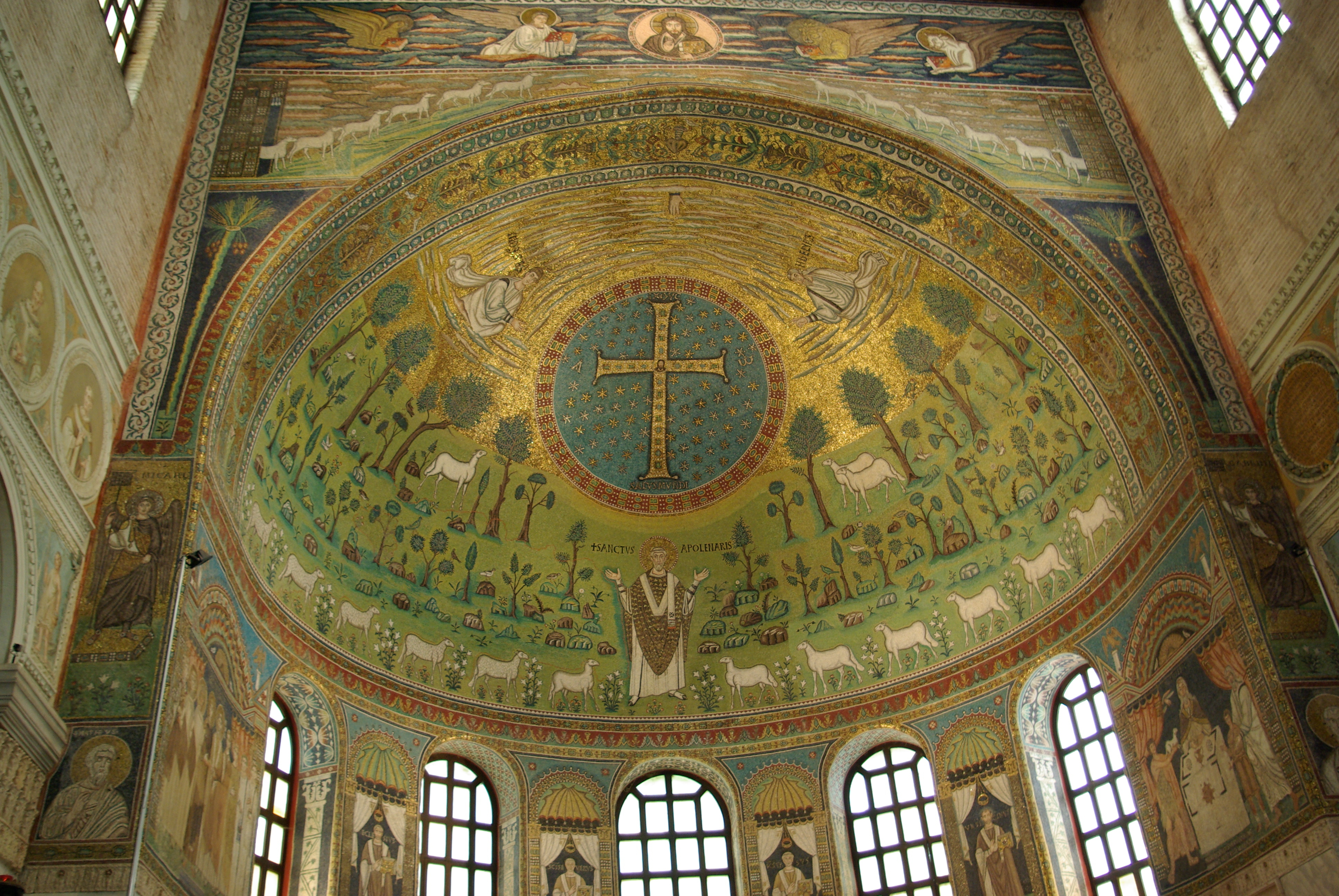
Ravenna, Sant'Apollinare in Classe, 6th century. The upper part of the semi-dome depicts the Transfiguration.

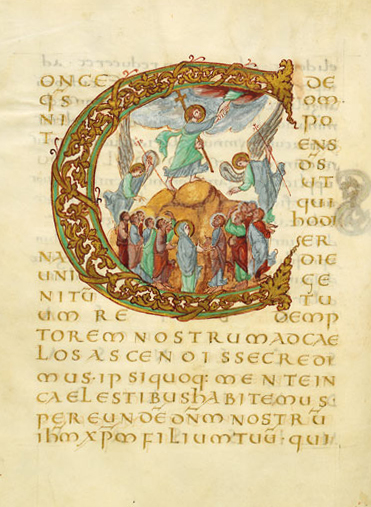
Ascension from the Drogo Sacramentary, c. 850, repeats the iconography of the ivory.

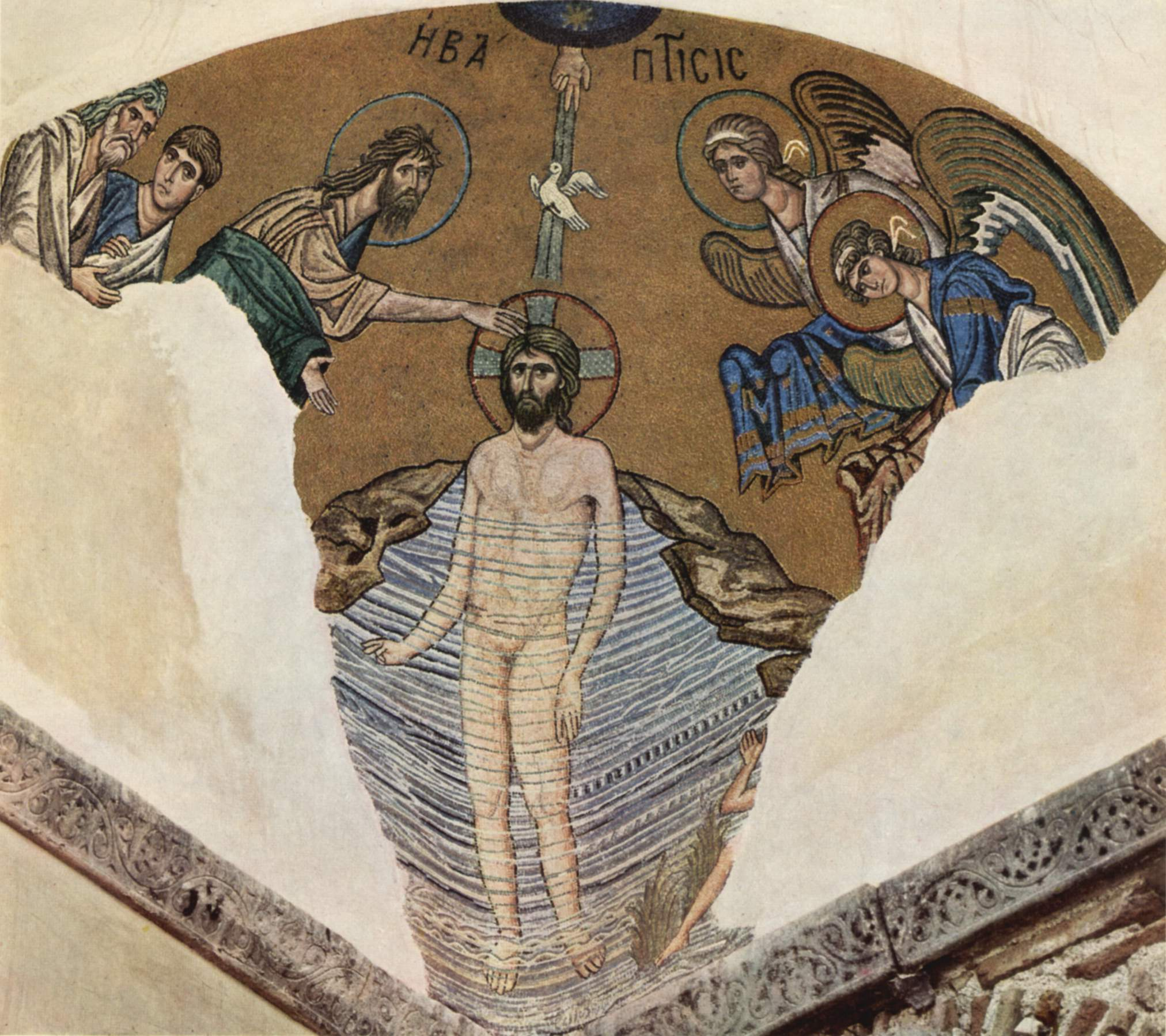
Mosaic Baptism of Jesus from Daphni, c. 1100

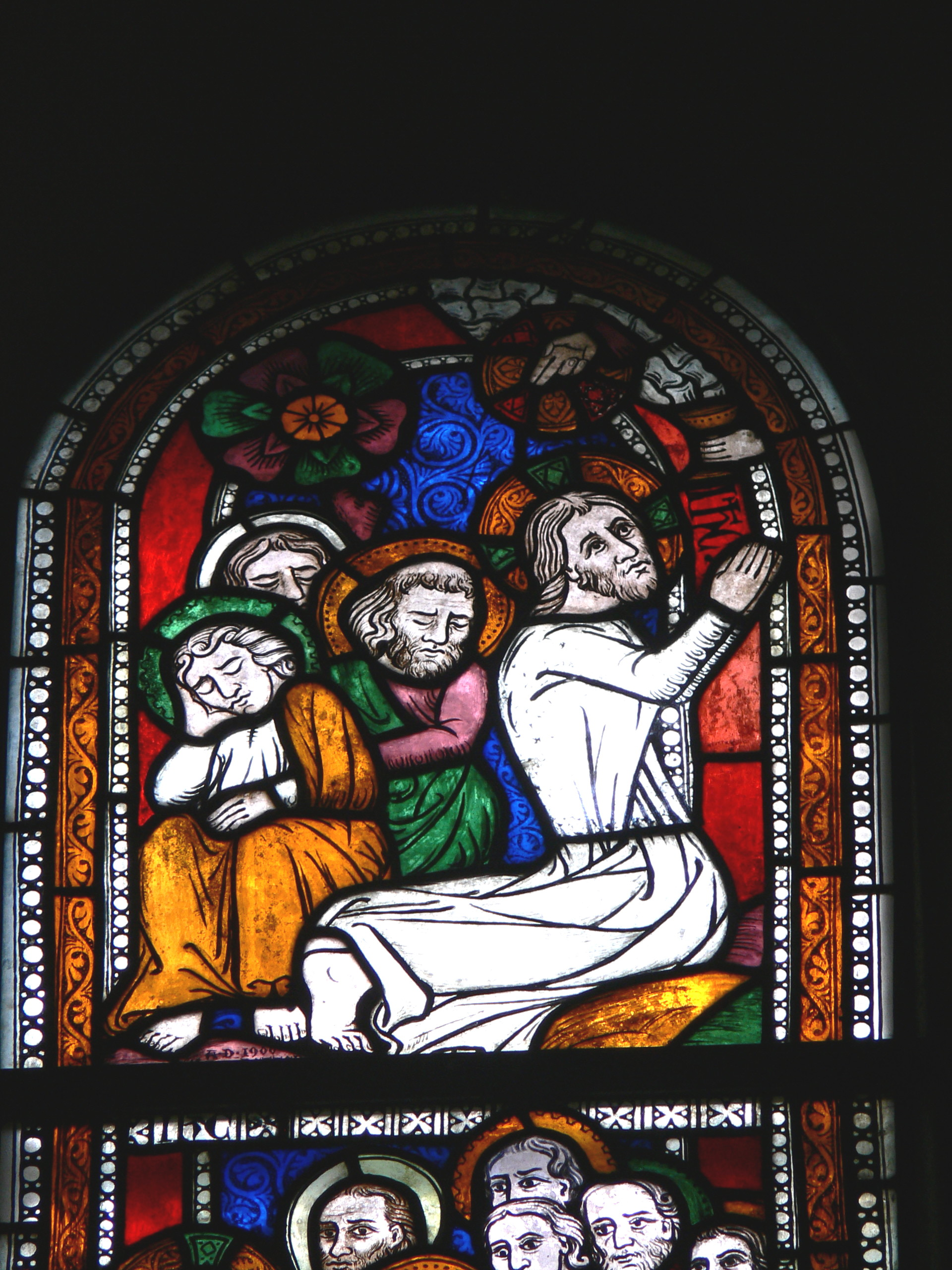
Hand with halo in 13th century stained glass of the Agony in the Garden

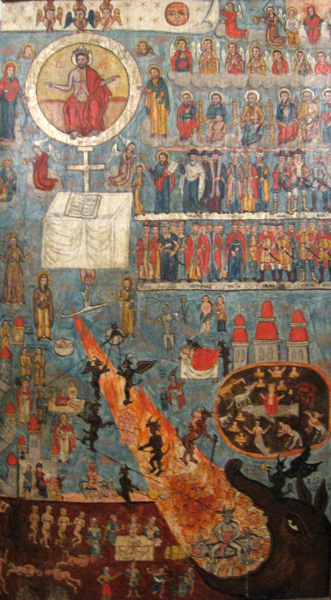
Detail of Russian icon of the Last Judgement, 18th century

==== Divine approval of rulers imagery ====
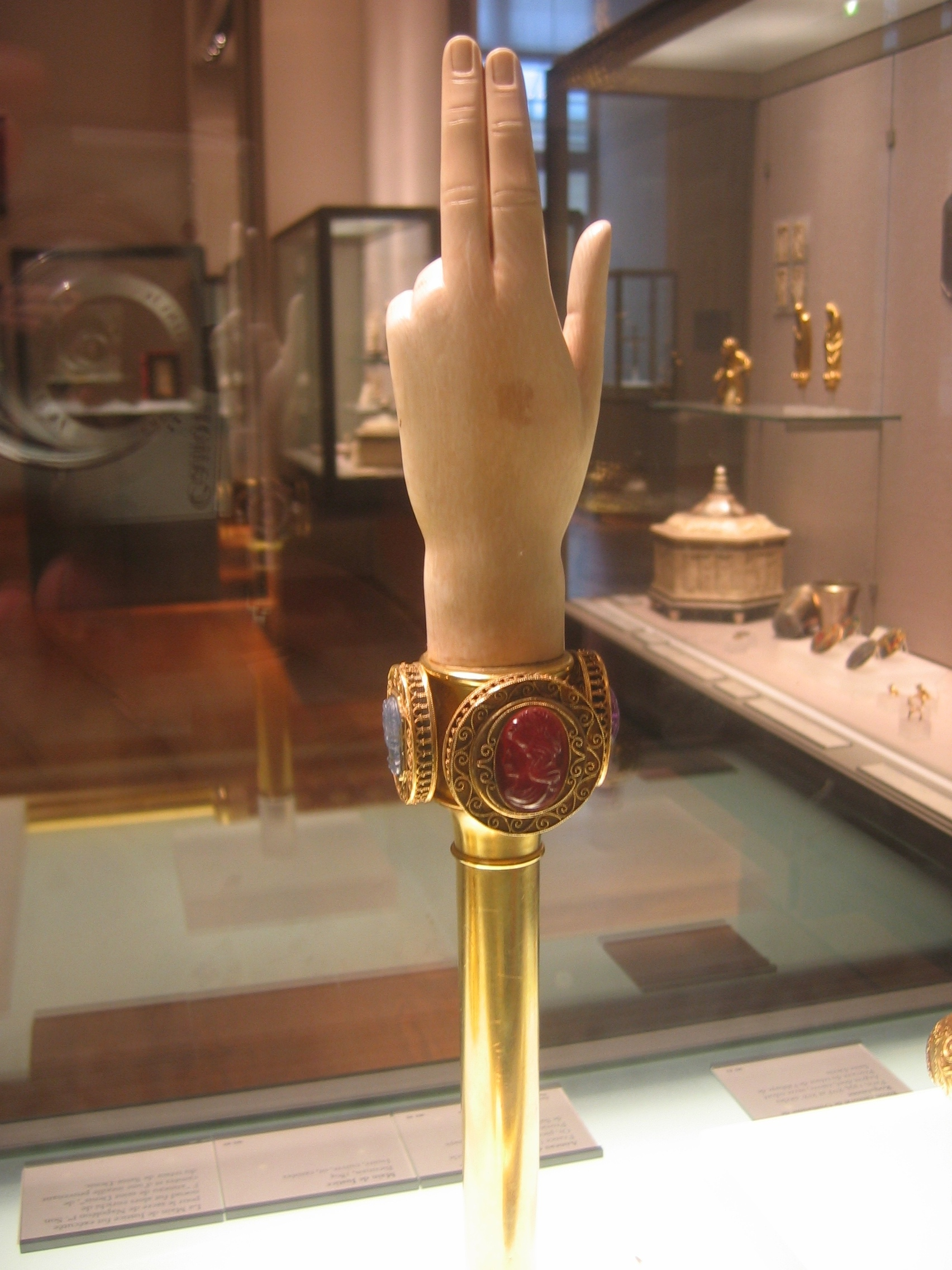
The recreated "Hand of Justice" used in Napoleon's coronation, Musée du Louvre.

The hand often blesses rulers from above, especially in Carolingian and Ottonian works, and coins. The hand may hold a wreath or crown over the ruler's head, or place it on the head. A posthumous coin of Constantine the Great (the "deification issue") had shown the hand reaching down to pull up a veiled figure of Constantine in a quadriga, in a famously mixed message that combined pagan conventions, where an eagle drew deified emperors up to the heavens, with Christian iconography. From the late 4th century coins of Late Antique rulers such as Arcadius (and his empress), Galla Placidia and others show them being crowned by it – it was in fact mostly used for empresses, and often only appears on issues from the Eastern Empire. This theme is not then seen in Byzantine art until the late 10th century, when it appears in coins of John I Tzimisces (969–976), long after it was common in the West. In later Byzantine miniatures figures the hand is often replaced by a full figure of Christ (in these examples much smaller than the Emperor) placing a crown on the head.

A similar symbolism was represented by the "Main de Justice" ("Hand of Justice"), part of the traditional French Coronation Regalia, which was a sceptre in the form of a short gold rod surmounted by an ivory hand in the blessing gesture. The object now in the Louvre is a recreation, made for Napoleon or a restored Bourbon king, of the original, which was destroyed in the French Revolution, although the original ivory hand has survived (now displayed separately). Engraved gems are used for an authentic medieval feel. Here the hand represents the justice-dispensing power of God as being literally in the hands of the king.

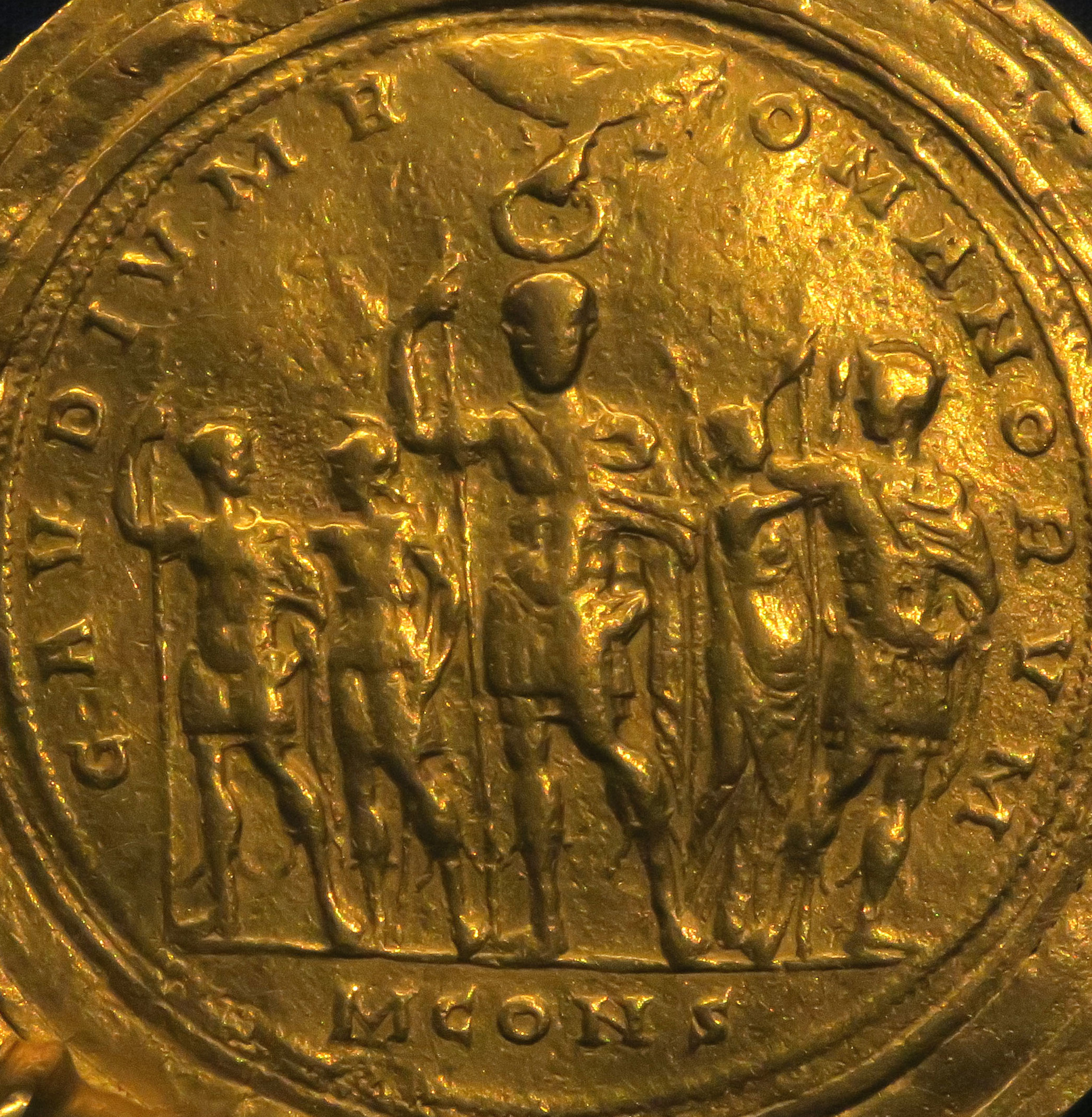
The Constantinian dynasty in the reign of Constantine the Great and his sons, with the augustus crowned by the hand

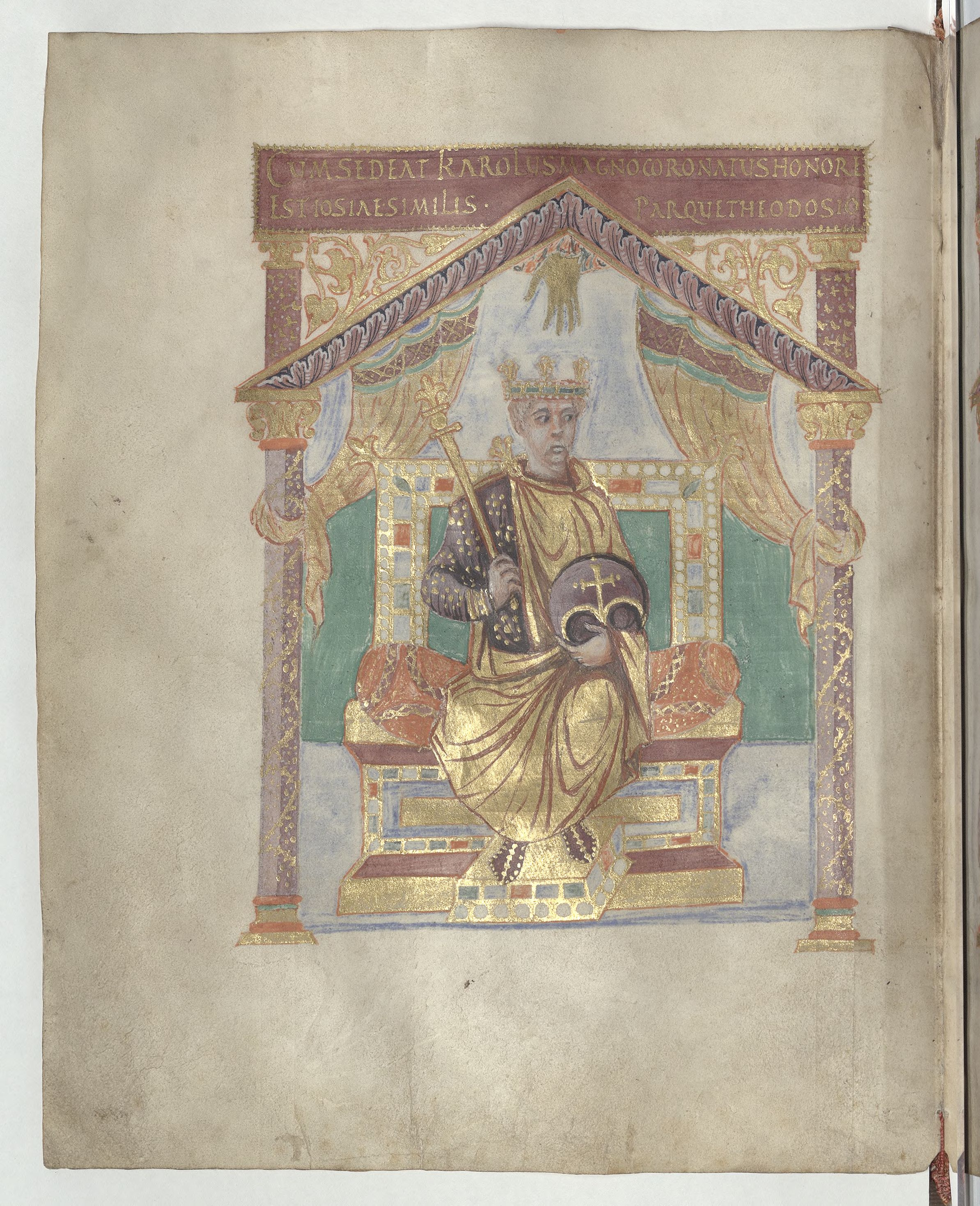
Charles the Bald, before 869

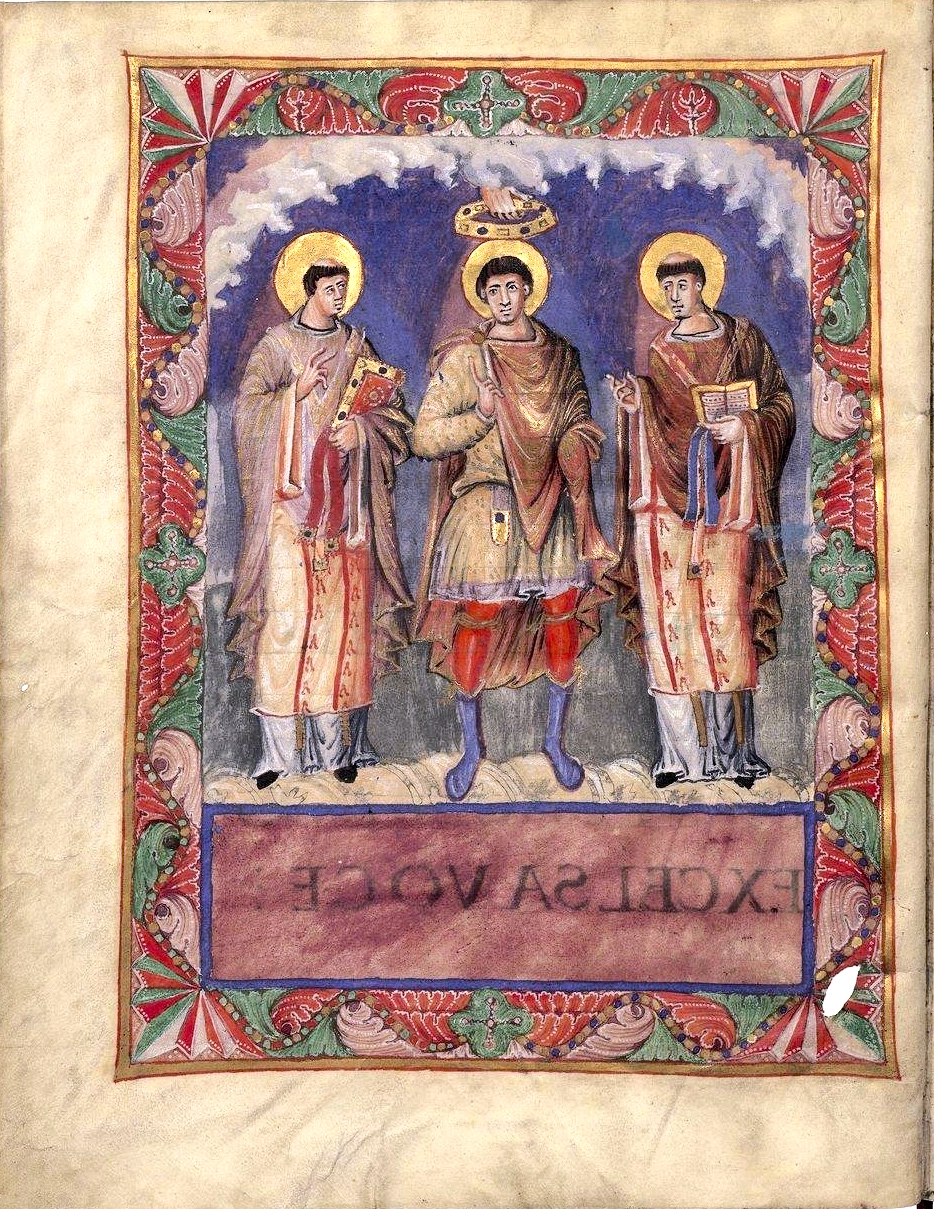
Charlemagne, flanked by two popes, is crowned, manuscript of c. 870.

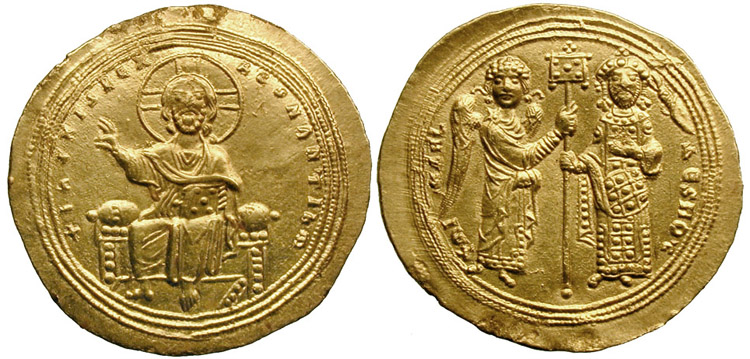
Byzantine gold histamenon coin of 1041/2. The emperor is crowned by the hand.

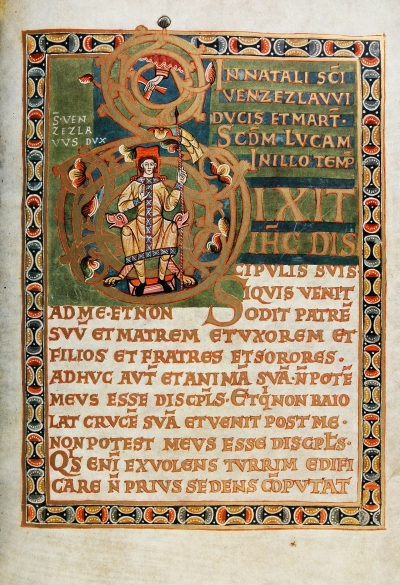
The new Bohemian monarchy uses a blessing haloed hand in the Coronation Gospels of Vratislav II.

==== Saints imagery ====
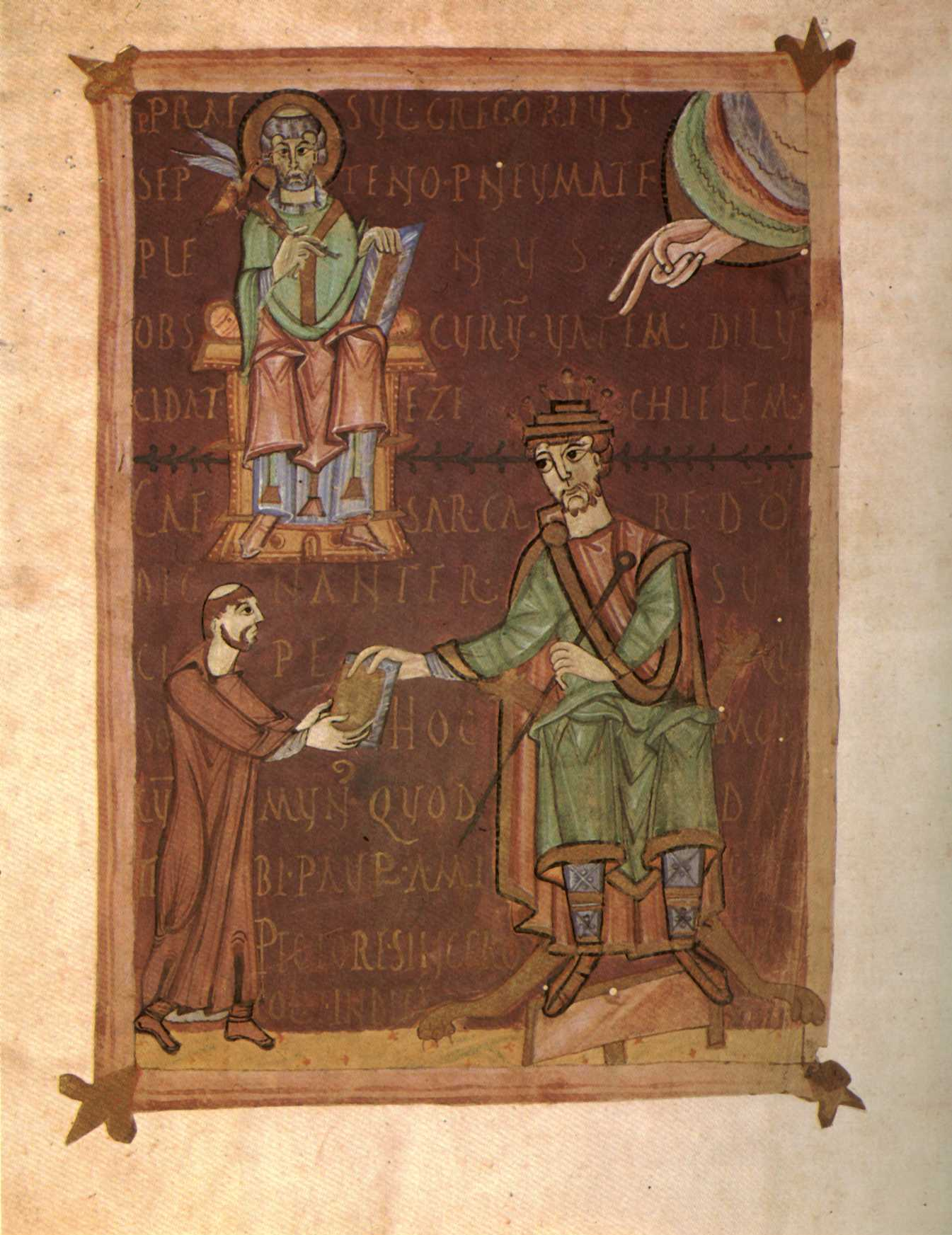
Presentation miniature in a copy of St Gregory's Moralia in Job, 11th century.

The hand can also be shown with images of saints, either actioning a miracle associated with a saint – in Catholic theology it is God who performs all miracles – or above an iconic scene. In the Bayeux Tapestry the hand appears over Westminster Abbey in the scene showing the funeral of Edward the Confessor. The hand sometimes appears (see gallery) in scenes of the murder of martyrs like St Thomas Becket, clearly indicating neither involvement nor approval of the deed, but approval of the saint. In the dedication miniature shown, the blessing hand seems pointed neither at Emperor Henry II, nor St Gregory or the abbot, but at the copy of Gregory's book – the same copy that contains this miniature. This looser usage of the motif reaches its peak in Romanesque art, where it occasionally appears in all sorts of contexts – indicating the "right" speaker in a miniature of a disputation, or as the only decoration at the top of a monastic charter. A number of Anglo-Saxon coins of Edward the Elder and Æthelred the Unready has a large hand dominating their reverse sides, although religious symbols were rarely so prominent on Anglo-Saxon coins.

==== Icons ====
In Eastern Orthodox icons the hand remained in use far longer than in the Western church, and is still found in modern icons, normally emerging from circular bands. Apart from the narrative scenes mentioned above it is especially often found in icons of military saints, and in some Russian icons is identified by the usual inscription as belonging to Jesus Christ. In other versions of the same composition a small figure of Christ of about the same size as the hand takes its place, which is also seen in many Western works from about 1000 onwards.

The earliest surviving icon of the Virgin Mary, of about 600 from Saint Catherine's Monastery, has an often overlooked hand, suggesting to Robin Cormack that the emphasis of the subject is on the Incarnation rather than a simple Virgin and Child. (Note: See also the apse mosaic of the Euphrasian Basilica, from about the 550s, which has a very similar composition.) Another of the very few major Eastern works showing the Virgin from before the Byzantine iconoclasm, an apse mosaic (lost in 1922) from Nicaea, also shows the hand above a standing Virgin. Few similar uses of the hand are seen in later Virgins, though the iconographically adventurous Byzantine Chludov Psalter (9th century) has a small miniature showing the hand and dove above a Virgin & Child. The hand occasionally appears in Western Annunciations, even as late as Simone Martini in the 14th century, by which time the dove, sometimes accompanied by a small image of God the Father, has become more common.

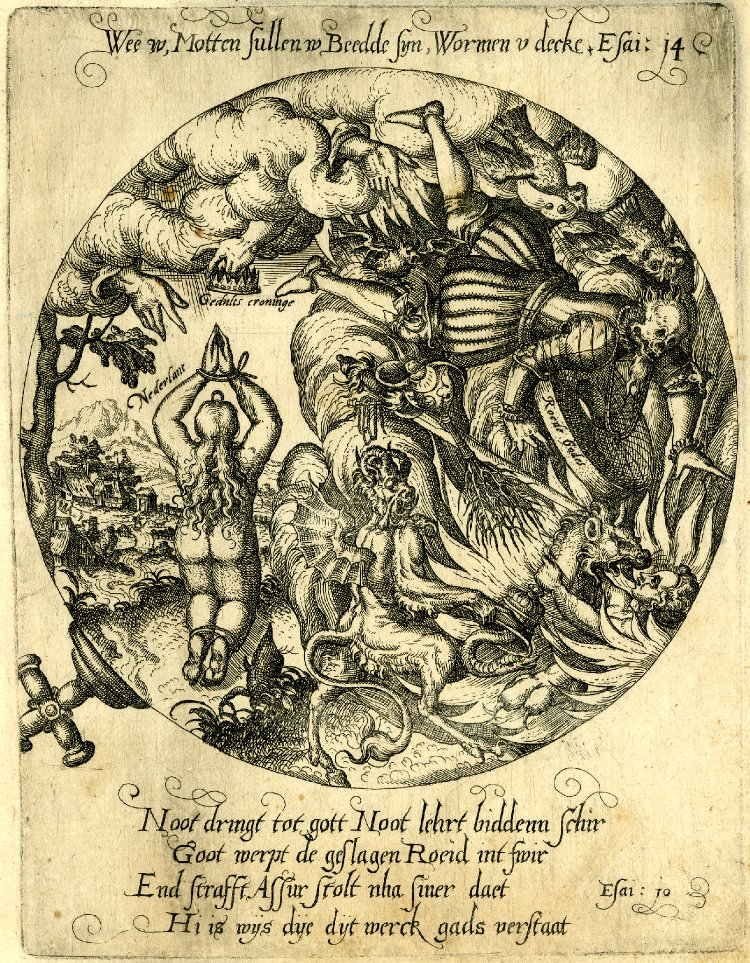
Anonymous print on the situation of the Netherlands in the 1570s, with three hands

==== Ravenna mosaics ====
The hand appears at the top of a number of Late Antique apse mosaics in Rome and Ravenna, above a variety of compositions that feature either Christ or the cross, (Note: One previously at Santi Cosma e Damiano (for example, see Dodwell, p. 5), seems now to have been restored away. Others are in Santa Cecilia in Trastevere, Santa Prassede, and others illustrated here.) some covered by the regular contexts mentioned above, but others not. The motif is then repeated in much later mosaics from the 12th century.

==== Late Medieval and early Renaissance art ====
From the 14th century, and earlier in some contexts, full figures of God the Father became increasingly common in Western art, though still controversial and rare in the Orthodox world. Naturally such figures all have hands, which use the blessing and other gestures in a variety of ways. It may be noted that the most famous of all such uses, Michelangelo's creating hand of God in the Sistine Chapel ceiling, breaks clear of God's encircling robe above the wrist, and is shown against a plain background in a way reminiscent of many examples of the earlier motif.

The motif did not disappear in later iconography, and enjoyed a revival in the 15th century as the range of religious subjects greatly expanded and depiction of God the Father became controversial again among Protestants. The prints of Daniel Hopfer and others make frequent use of the hand in a variety of contexts, and the personal emblem of John Calvin was a heart held in the Hand. Very free use of the motif is made in prints relating to the religious and political fall-out of the Reformation over the next two centuries, in prints on the Dutch Revolt for example. In a high Rococo setting at the Windberg Abbey, Lower Bavaria, the Hand of God holds scales in which a lily stem indicating Saint Catherine's purity outweighs the crown and sceptre of worldly pomp.

The similar but essentially unrelated arm-reliquary was a popular form during the medieval period when the hand was most used. Typically these are in precious metal, showing the hand and most of the forearm, pointing up erect from a flat base where the arm stopped. They contained relics, usually from that part of the body of the saint, and it was the saint's hand that was represented.

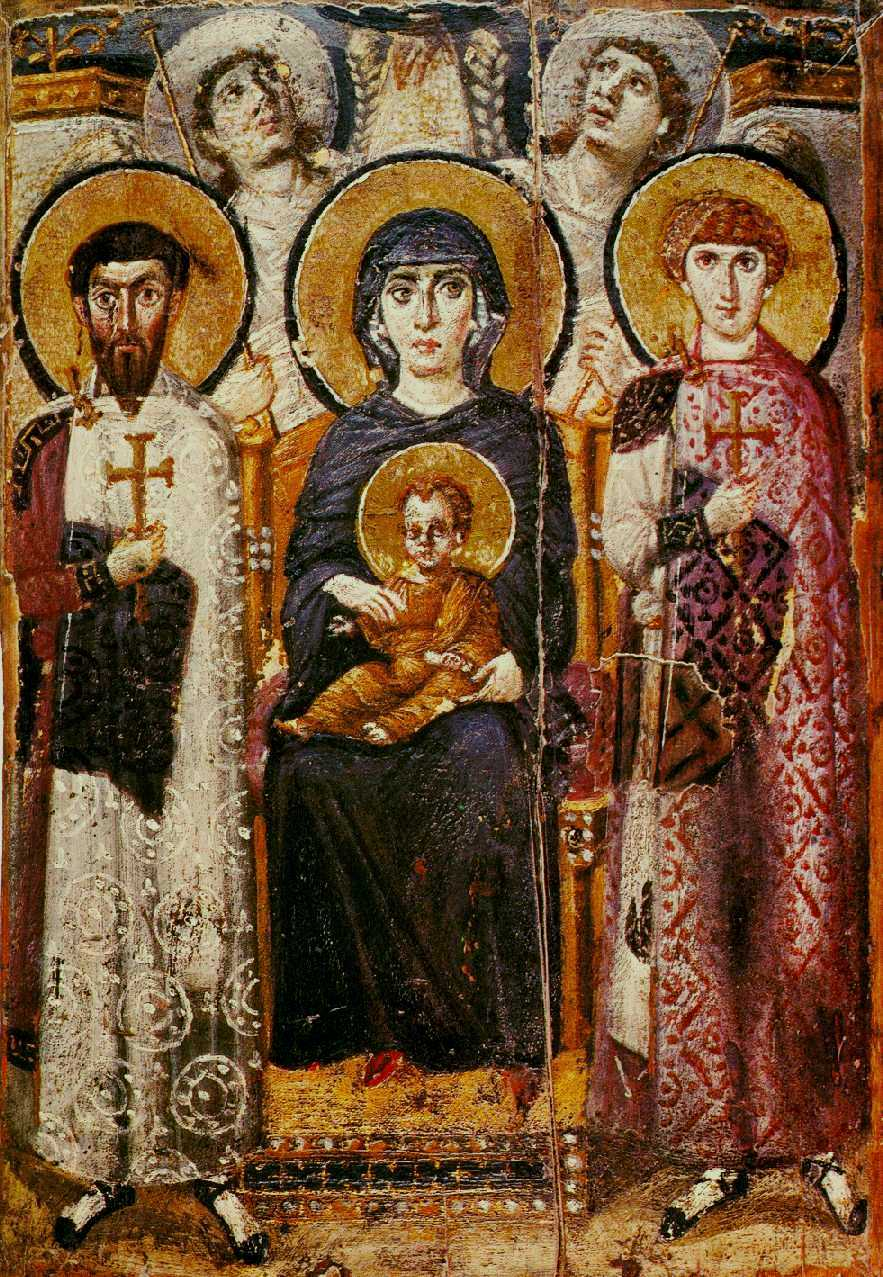
The oldest Byzantine icon of Mary, c. 600, encaustic, at Saint Catherine's Monastery.

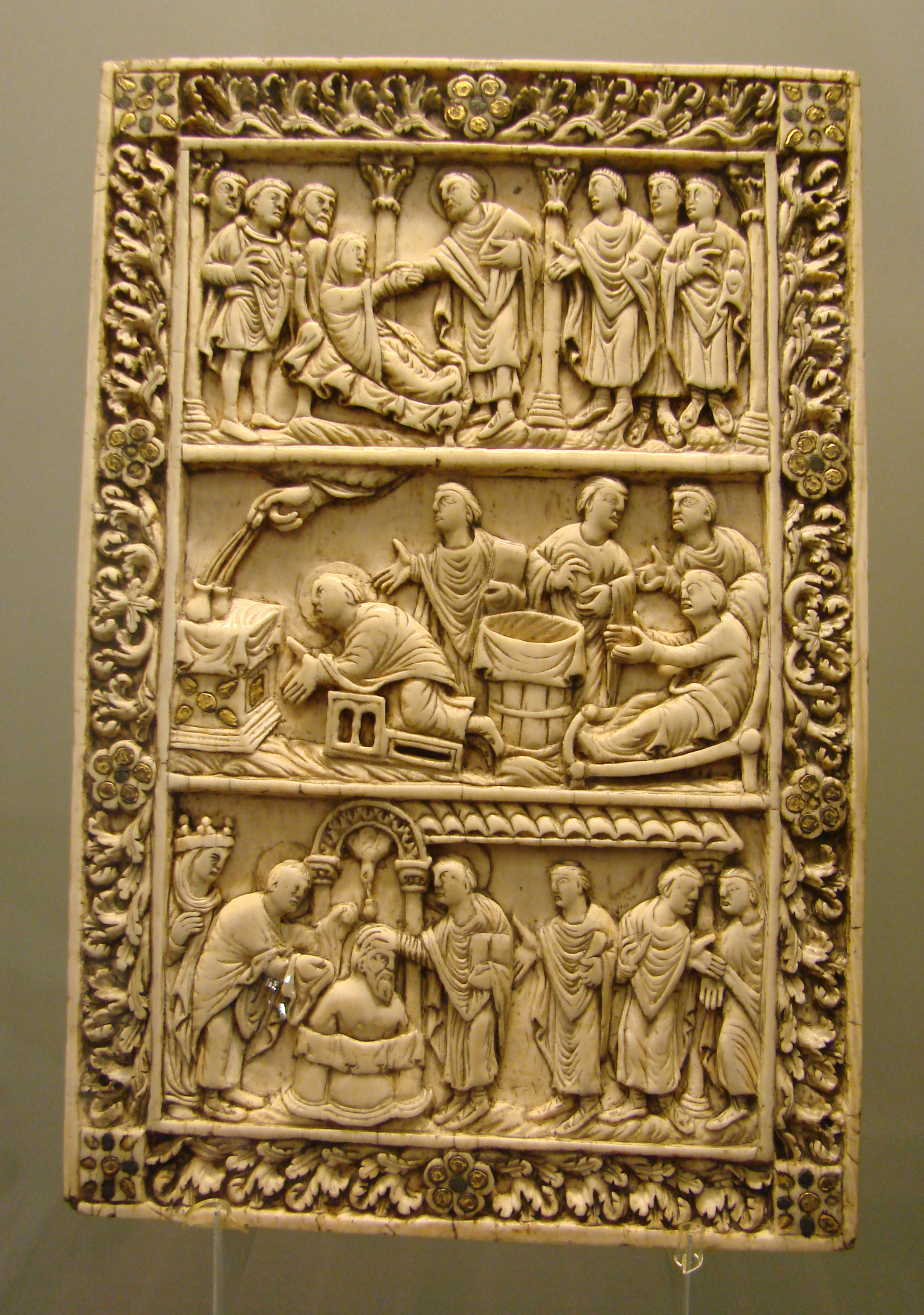
Miracle from the life of Saint Remy, c. 870, in the middle register. Note the dove delivering the Sainte Ampoule at bottom.

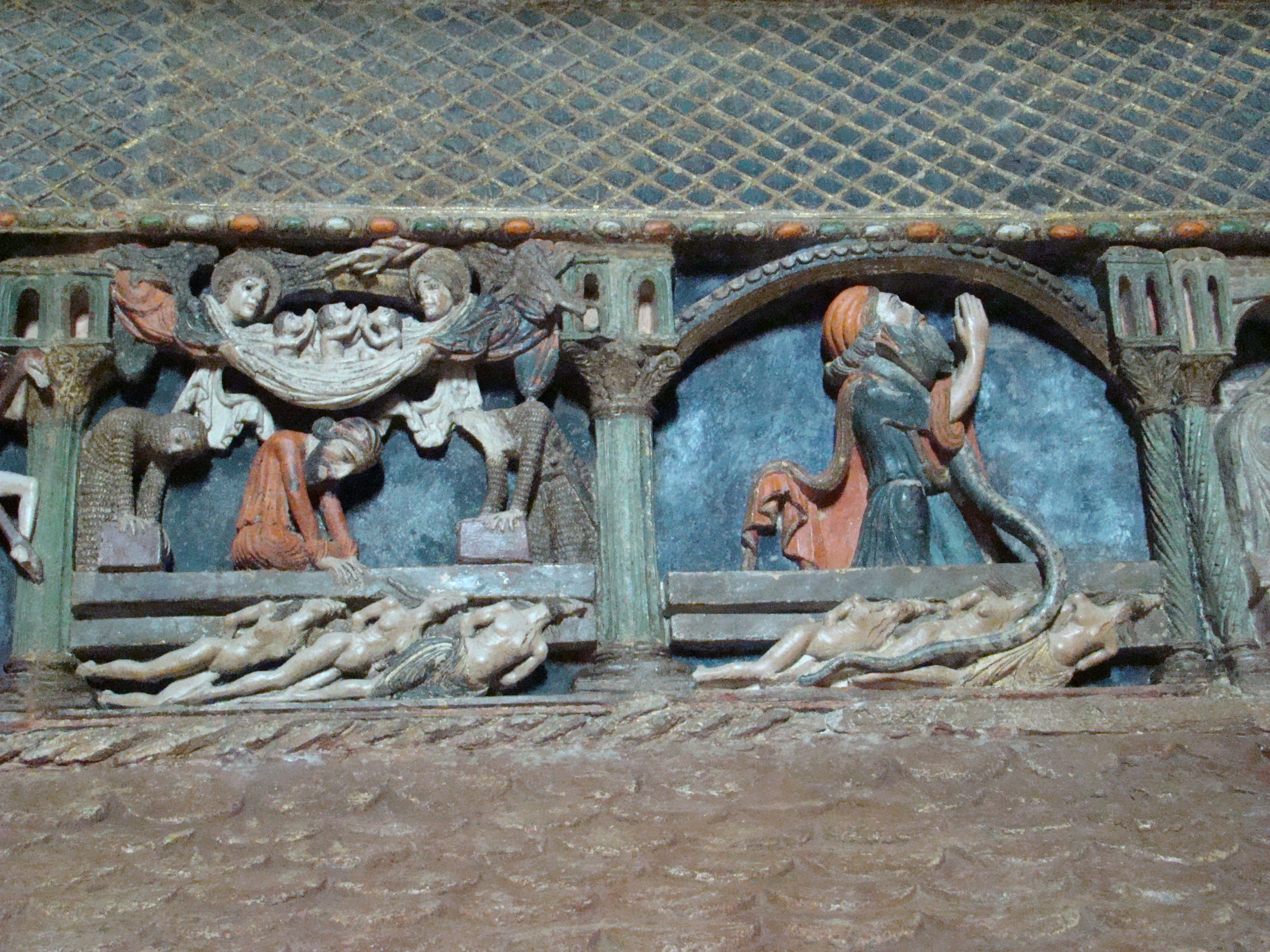
The hand receives the souls of three martyrs born up to heaven by Angels. Ávila

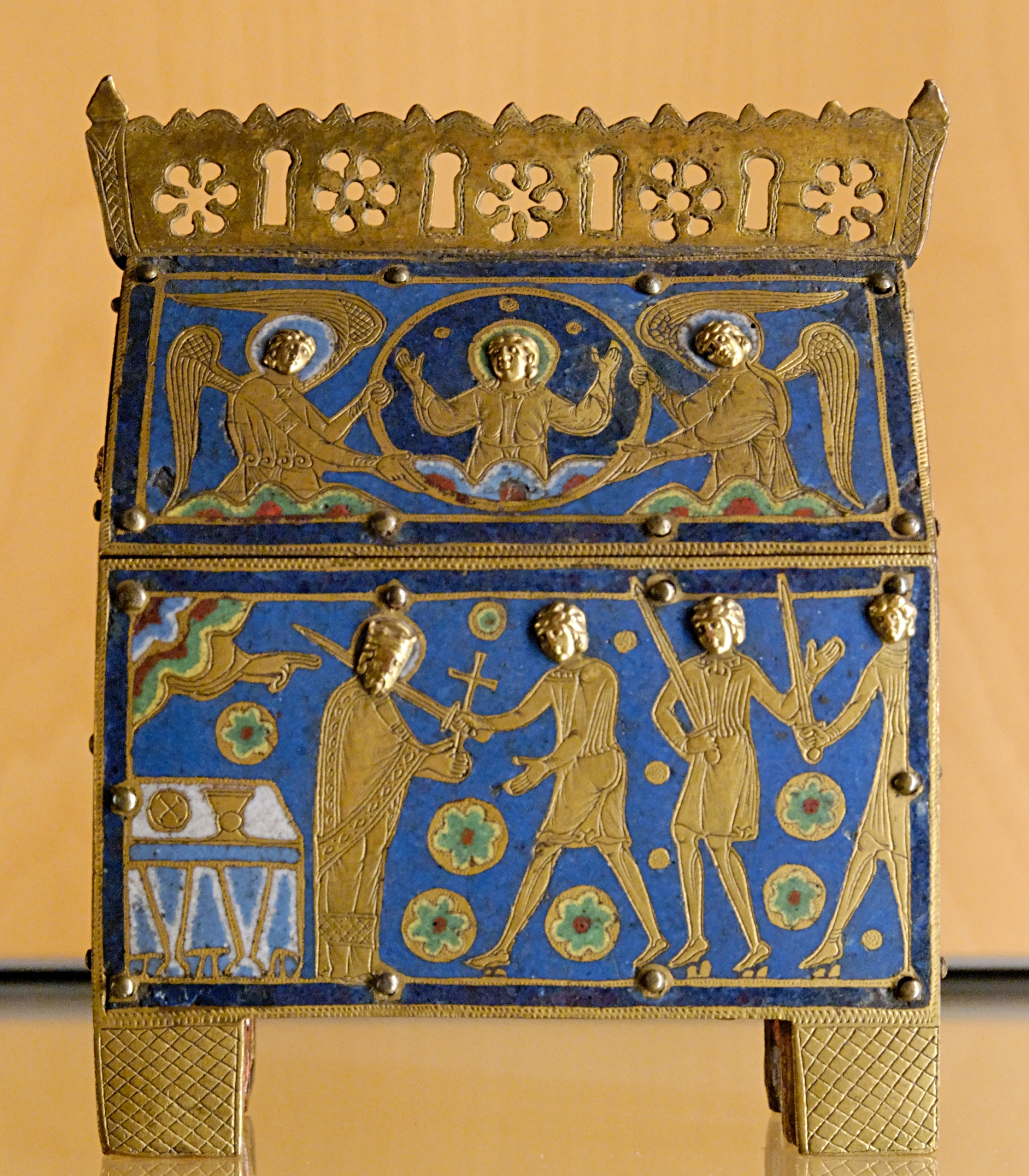
Enamelled reliquary of St Thomas Becket, showing his murder. Limoges, c. 1210

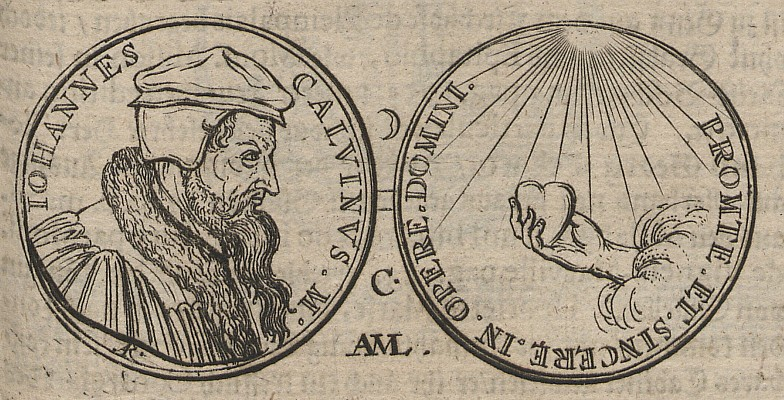
The Protestant reformer John Calvin and his emblem

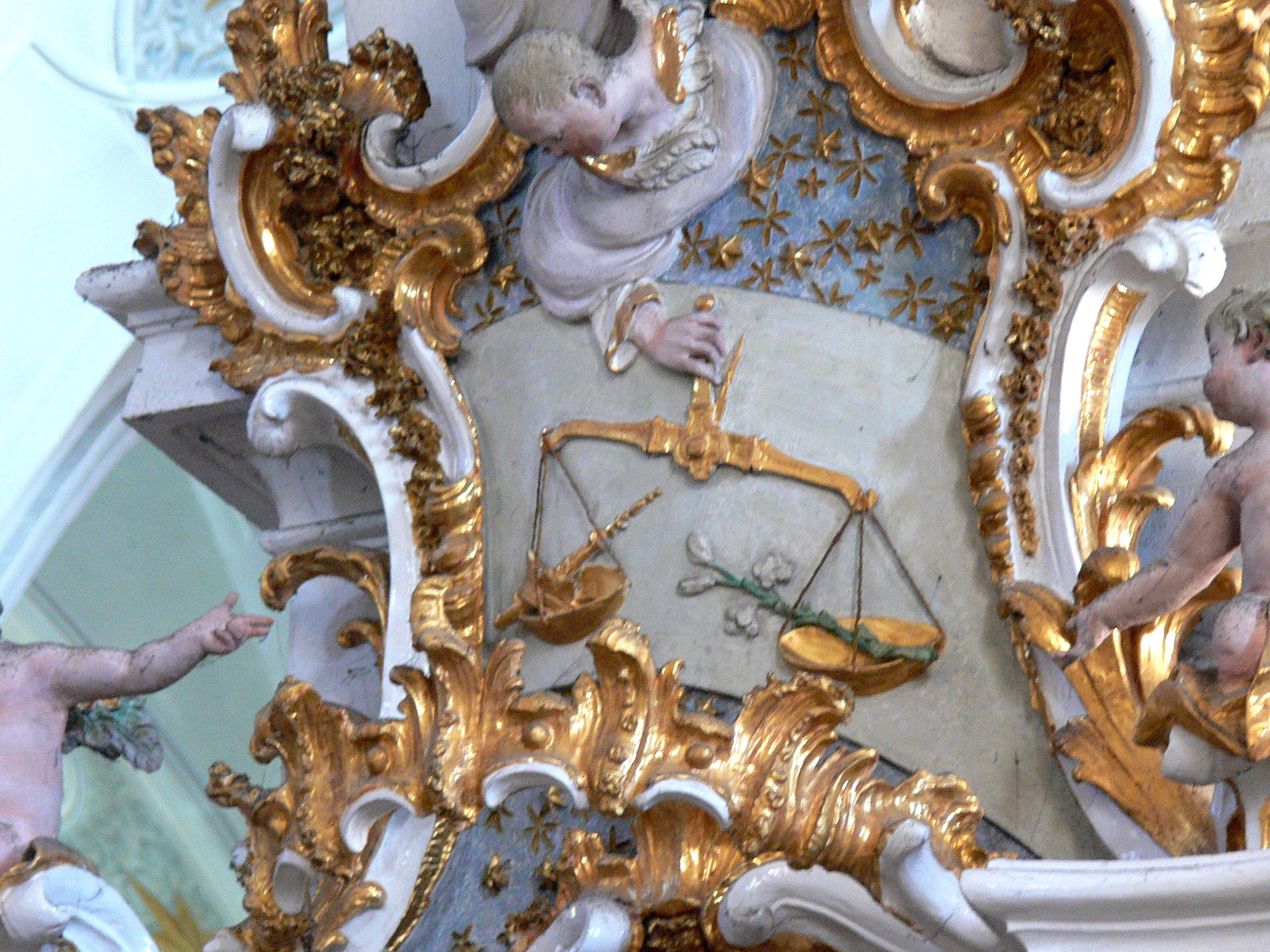
The Hand of God at Windberg Abbey – see text

== Examples in late antique and medieval Jewish art ==
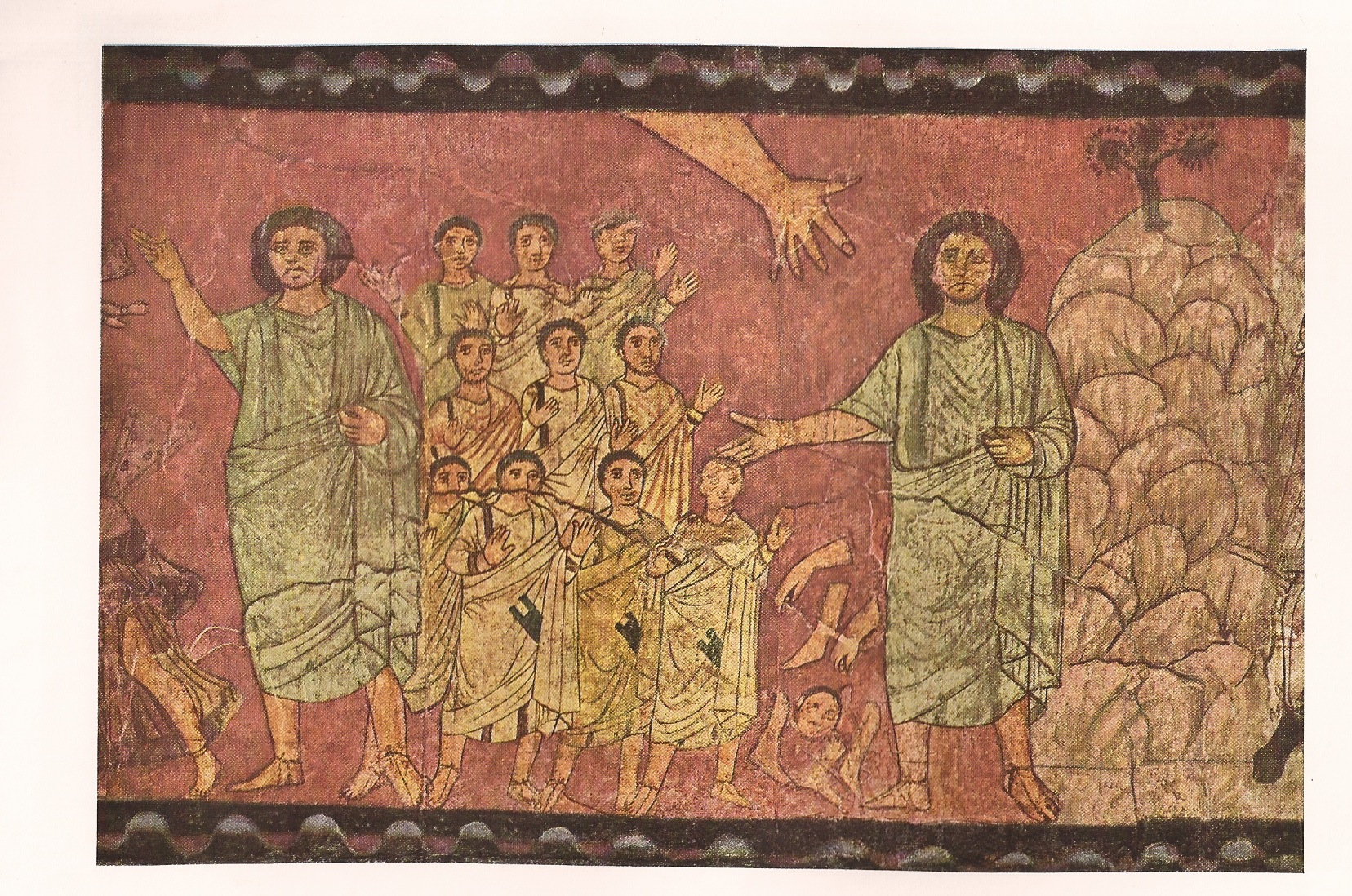
Ezekiel in the Valley of Dry Bones cycle Dura Europos synagogue

The hand of God appears in several examples from the small surviving body of figurative Jewish religious art. It is especially prominent in the wall paintings of the third-century Dura Europos synagogue, and also seen in the nave mosaic of the sixth century Beth Alpha synagogue, and on a sixth-seventh century bimah screen found at the fourth-fifth century Susiya synagogue.

=== Dura Europos synagogue ===
In the Dura Europos synagogue, the hand of God appears ten times, in five out of the twenty-nine biblically themed wall paintings including the Binding of Isaac, Moses and the Burning Bush, Exodus and Crossing of the Red Sea, Elijah Reviving the Child of the Widow of Zarepheth, and Ezekiel in the Valley of Dry Bones. In several examples the hand includes the forearm as well.

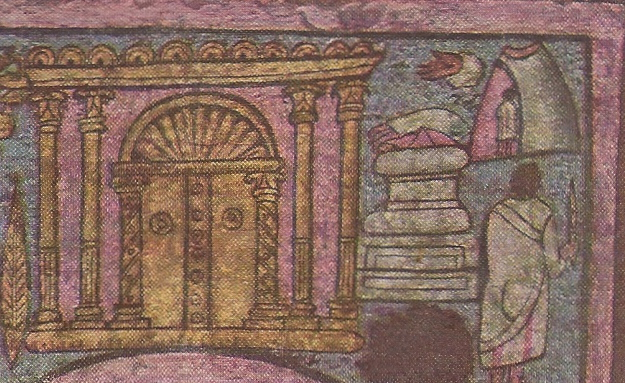
Binding of Isaac Torah Niche, Dura Europos synagogue

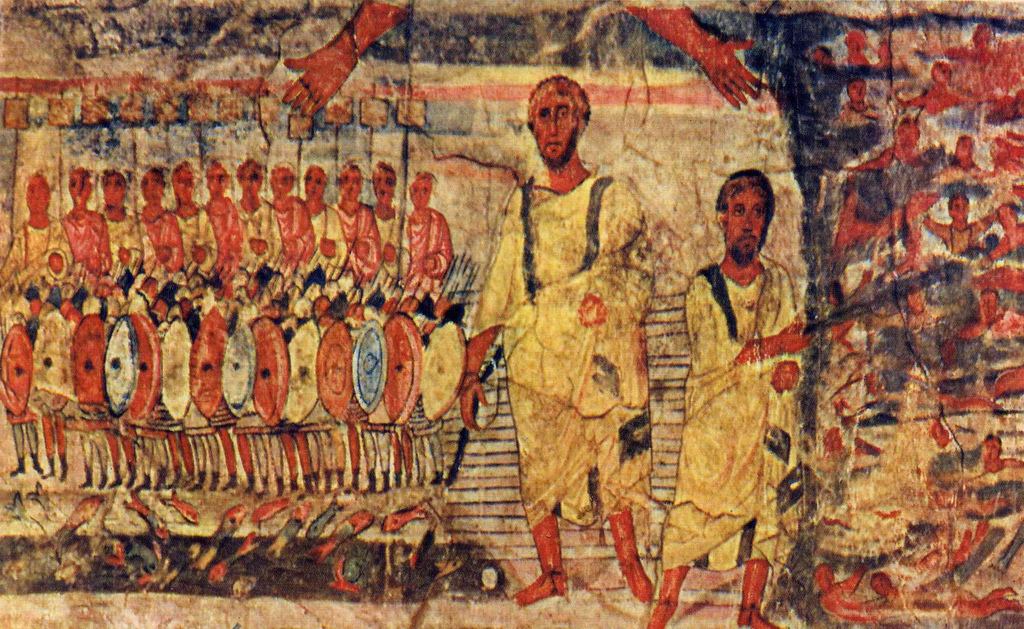
Hand of God in Exodus and the Crossing of the Red Sea wall painting Dura Europos synagogue

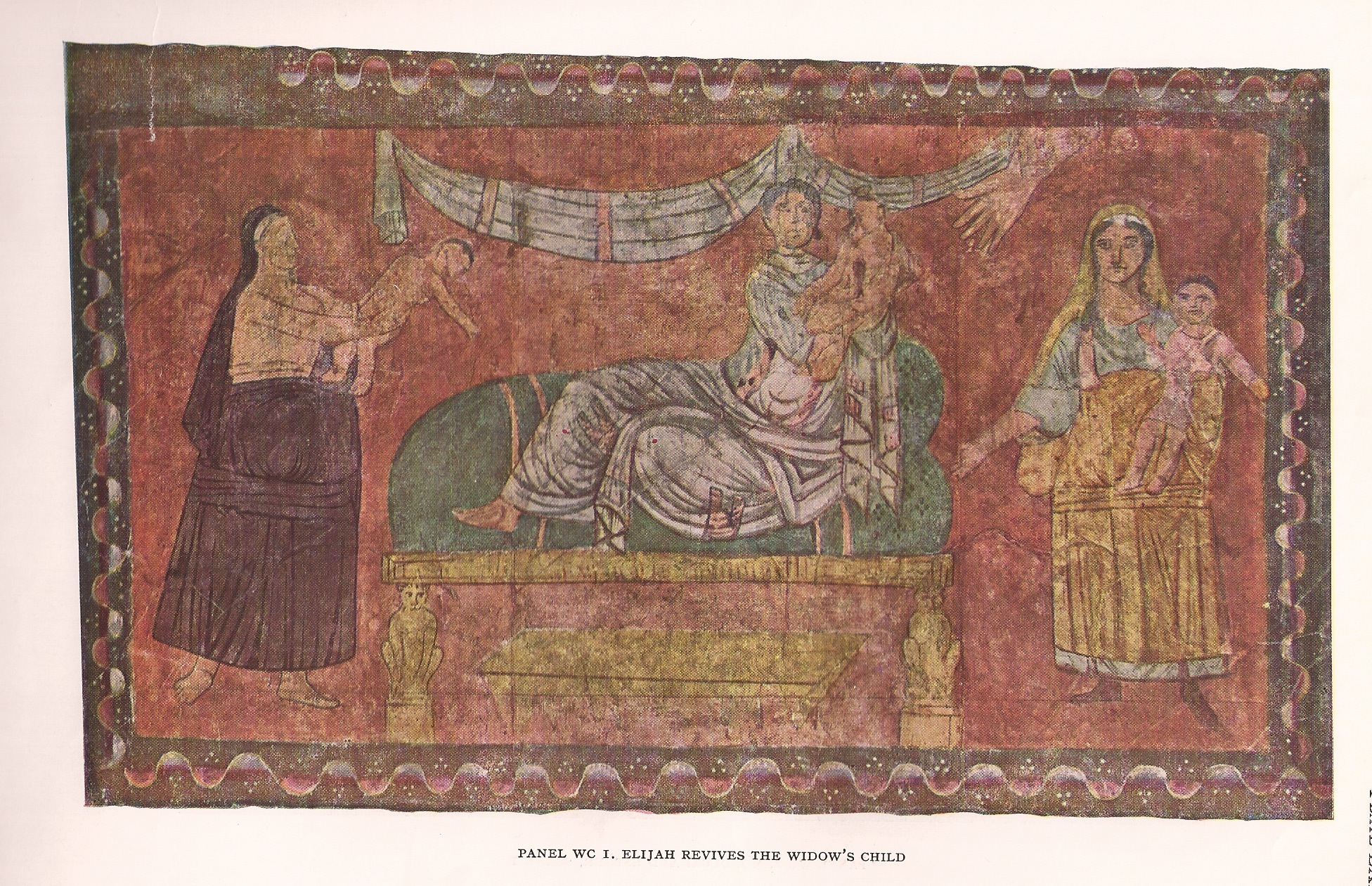
Elijah Revives the Child of the Widow of Zarepheth wall painting Dura Europos synagogue

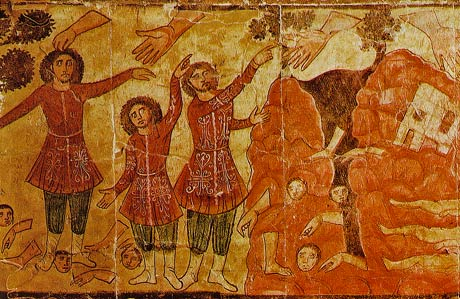
Ezekiel in the Valley of Dry Bones cycle Dura Europos synagogue

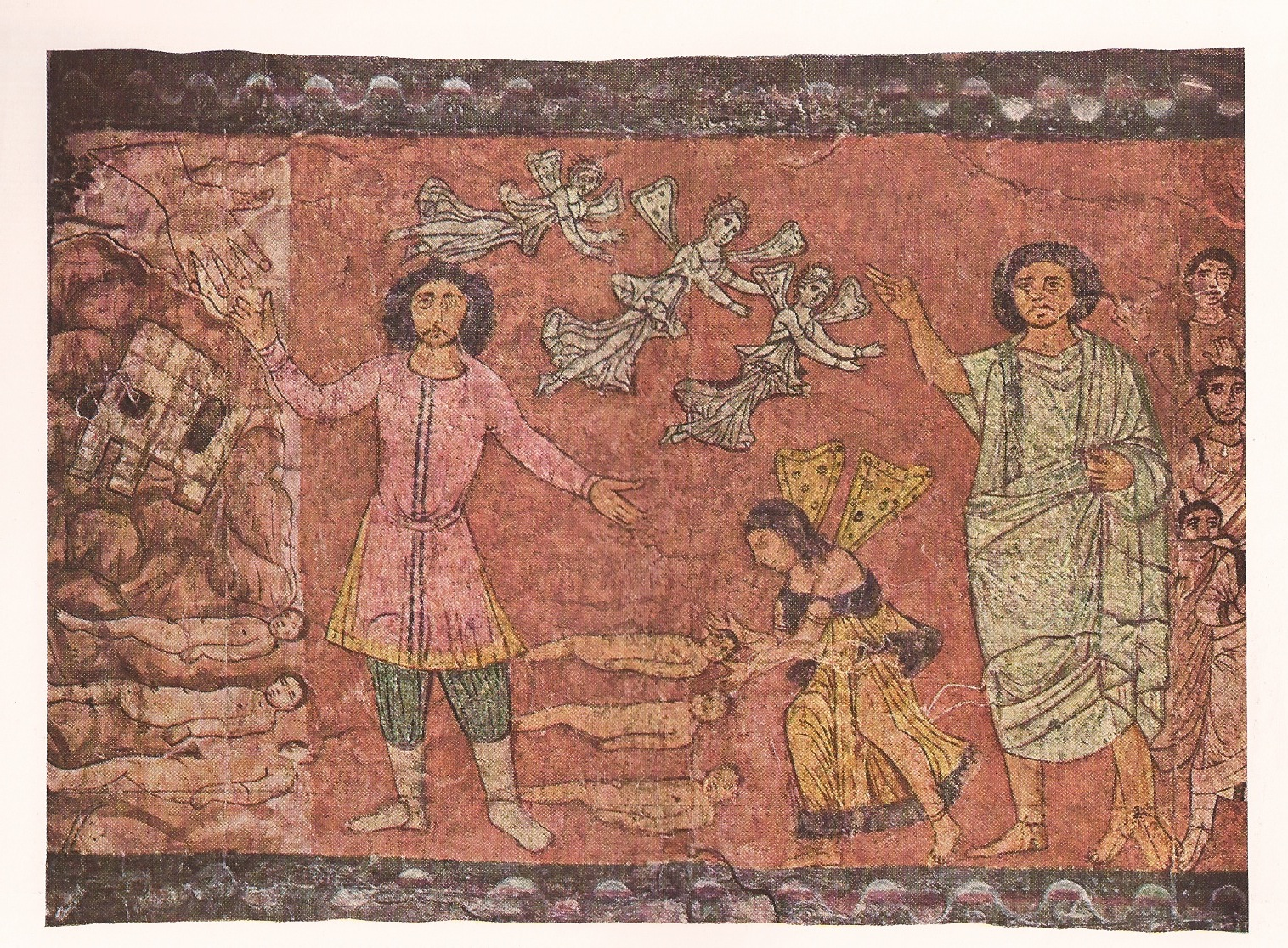
Ezekiel in the Valley of Dry Bones cycle Dura Europos synagogue

=== Beth Alpha synagogue ===
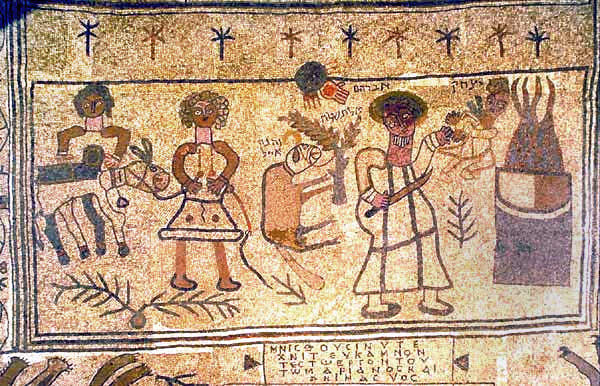
Binding of Isaac mosaic, Beth Alpha

In the Beth Alpha synagogue, the hand of God appears on the Binding of Isaac panel on the northern entryway of the synagogue's nave mosaic floor. The hand of God appearing in the Beth Alpha Binding of Isaac mosaic panel is depicted as a disembodied hand emerging from a fiery ball of smoke, "directing the drama and its outcome" according to Meyer Schapiro. The hand of God is positioned strategically in the upper center of the composition, directly above the ram that the angel of God instructs Abraham to sacrifice in place of Isaac.

=== Susiya synagogue ===
In the Susiya synagogue, the hand of God appears on the defaced remains of a marble bimah screen that perhaps once illustrated a biblical scene such as Moses Receiving the Law or the Binding of Isaac. Though the hand was subjected to intense iconoclastic hacking, the iconoclasts left some vestiges of the thumb and the receding fingers intact. A thumbnail has been carved into the thumb. Foerster asserts that the hand of God originally held a Torah scroll, identifying the small piece of raised marble located between the thumb and fingers as a Torah scroll.

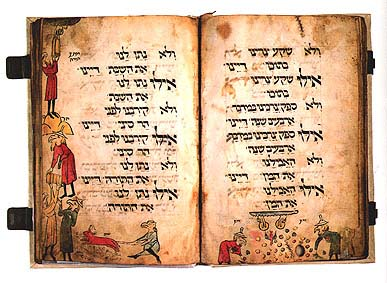
Birds' Head Haggadah

=== Birds' Head Haggadah ===
The hand of God appears in the early 14th-century Haggadah, the Birds' Head Haggadah, produced in Germany. Two hands of God appear underneath the text of the Dayenu song, dispensing the manna from heaven. The Birds' Head Haggadah is a particularly important visual source from the medieval period, as it is the earliest surviving example of a medieval illuminated Hebrew Haggadah.

== See also ==
- Act of God
- Divine countenance
- Finger of God (Biblical phrase)
- God the Father in Western art
- Sabazios

== Notes ==
Footnotes

Citations
