= Finger of God =

Phrase used in the Bible

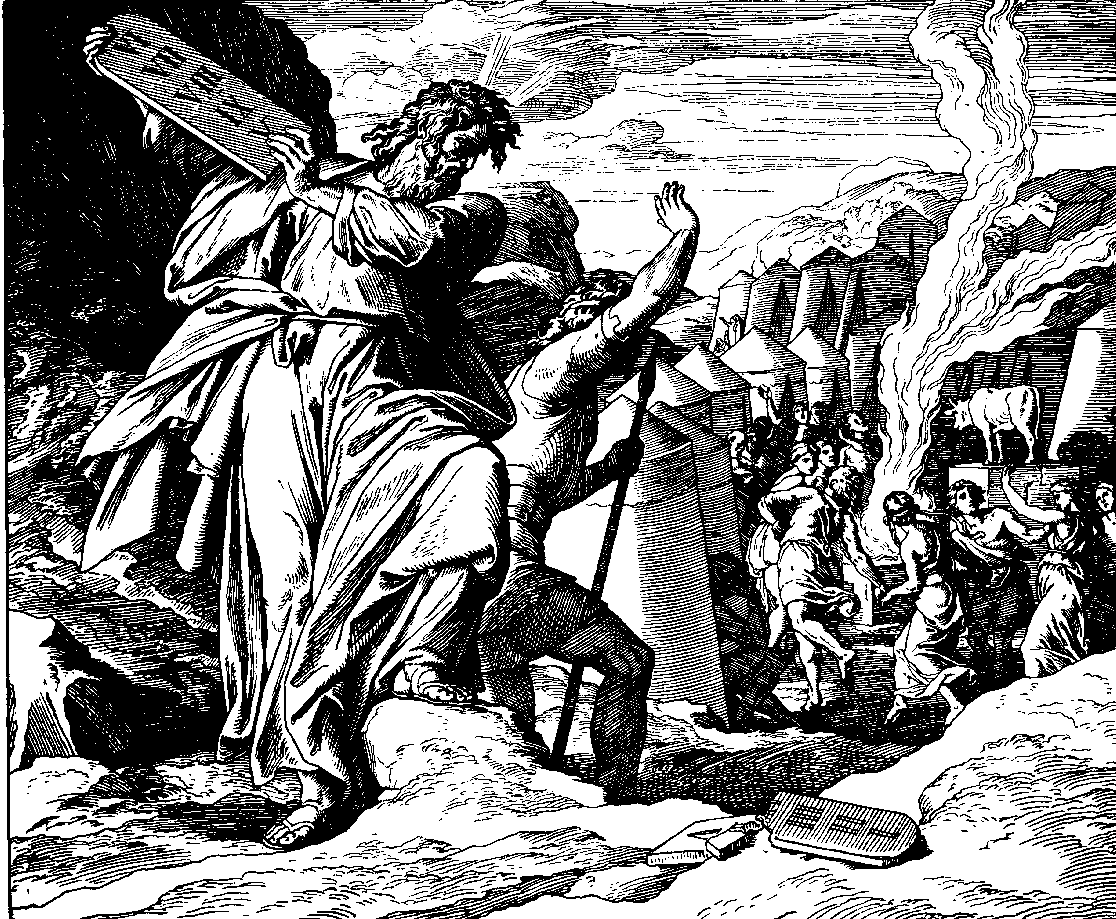
Moses breaks the Ten Commandments inscribed by the Finger of God in response to the golden calf worship in this 1860 woodcut by Julius Schnorr von Carolsfeld.

"Finger of God" (Hebrew: אֶצְבַּע אֱלֹהִים ’eṣba‘ ’Ĕlōhîm) is a phrase used in the Torah, translated into the Christian Bible. In Exodus 8:19 it is used during the plagues of Egypt by Pharaoh's magicians. In Exodus 31:18 and Deuteronomy 9:10 it refers to the method by which the Ten Commandments were written on the Tablets of Stone that were brought down from Mount Sinai by Moses.

It was also used once by Jesus in the Gospel of Luke to describe how he had cast out demons.

Jews in the tradition of Maimonides posit that anthropomorphism in the Torah, such as the use of body part names, is completely metaphorical, as human bodies are based on potencies of God, not the other way around.

The Finger of God is a phrase used in the Pentateuch or the Five Books of Moses, specifically in the Book of Exodus, to describe an expression of God's power and authority. In Exodus 8:19, Pharaoh's magicians acknowledge the plagues as the finger of God, referring to the harsh natural phenomena that God has brought upon Egypt. The term is also mentioned in Exodus 31:18, where it is said that God wrote the Ten Commandments on tablets of stone with his own finger.

The phrase "finger of God" is used to symbolize the power and might of God and is commonly interpreted by scholars as a sign of His divine intervention and the manifestation of His will. In the New Testament, it is also used metaphorically in reference to the Spirit of God (Luke 11:20, Matthew 12:28). Overall, the Finger of God is a biblical expression that signifies the authority and power of God in the world.

== Hebrew Bible ==
The first time the phrase "finger of God" appears is in the Hebrew Bible, in the eighth chapter, in the paragraph of verses sixteen through twenty of the Book of Exodus, which reads

Then the Lord said to Moses, "Say to Aaron, 'Stretch out your staff and strike the dust of the earth, so that it may become gnats throughout the whole land of Egypt.'" And they did so; Aaron stretched out his hand with his staff and struck the dust of the earth, and gnats came on humans and animals alike; all the dust of the earth turned into gnats throughout the whole land of Egypt. The magicians tried to produce gnats by their secret arts, but they could not. There were gnats on both humans and animals. And the magicians said to Pharaoh, "This is the finger of God!" But Pharaoh’s heart was hardened, and he would not listen to them, just as the Lord had said.

— Exodus 8:16–20

The second time the phrase "finger of God" appears is at the last verse, verse eighteen of the thirty-first chapter of the same book, which reads "And he gave unto Moses, when he had made an end of communing with him upon mount Sinai, two tables of testimony, tables of stone, written with the finger of God."

The third time the phrase appears is a second reference to the tablets of the Ten Commandments, and is found in Deuteronomy 9:10, which says "And the LORD delivered unto me two tables of stone written with the finger of God; and on them was written according to all the words, which the LORD spake with you in the mount out of the midst of the fire in the day of the assembly."

=== Writing on the wall ===
The fourth biblical mention is during Belshazzar's Feast in Daniel 5, when scripture reports 'fingers of a man's hand' wrote on the wall:

מנא מנא תקל ופרסין

Daniel reads the words "MENE, MENE, TEKEL, UPHARSIN" and interprets them for the king: "MENE, God has numbered the days of your kingdom and brought it to an end; TEKEL, you have been weighed ... and found wanting;" and "PERES, your kingdom is divided and given to the Medes and Persians. Then Belshazzar gave the command, and Daniel was clothed in purple, a chain of gold was put around his neck, and a proclamation was made… that he should rank third in the kingdom; [and] that very night Belshazzar the Chaldean (Babylonian) king was killed, and Darius the Mede received the kingdom."

The phrase the writing on the wall has entered our lexicon from this reference to mean a warning of impending doom.

== New Testament ==
The Greek phrase (Greek: ἐν δακτύλῳ θεοῦ, en dactylō Theou, "by the finger of God") is also used by Jesus in the Christian New Testament during his reply to those who said that he cast out demons by the power of Beelzebub. He said, "But if it is by the finger of God that I cast out the demons, then the kingdom of God has come to you." In a parallel passage in Matthew 12:25–29, the phrase "the finger of God" is replaced with "the Spirit of God", indicating that the two phrases are synonymous or related.

In the New Testament story of Jesus and the woman taken in adultery, Jesus writes in the dust of the earth with his finger. Pope Benedict XVI notes from St Augustine that this gesture can be seen as portraying Christ as the divine legislator; Jesus' actions in writing in the dust are redolent of the Finger of God writing the Law on tablets of stone.

== See also ==
- Act of God
- Belshazzar's feast
- The Creation of Adam
