= Yod (astrology) =

Astrological formation of two astral bodies

In astrology (in the context of a horoscope), a yod is a specific, planetary alignment formed by two planets being sextile to one another (60° apart), with a third planet being exactly 150° to the other two points, or quincunx (also called inconjunct). In essence, the three points add up as 150°+150°+60°=360° in a traditional, spherical astrological chart. Visually, this alignment forms a pattern, with one point being nearly directly across (150°) from two other points that are 60° apart from each other. The Yod takes its name from the tenth letter of the Hebrew Language, and has been called the "finger of god" or "arrow of fate".

While the sextile is an inherently harmonious astrological aspect, the quincunx is unrelated to either of the sextile planets. A quincunx is the aspect just shy of an opposition; for example, Gemini is in opposition (180°) to Sagittarius, and Scorpio and Capricorn are located on either side of Sagittarius. Thus, Gemini is said to be “inconjunct”, or quincunx, to Scorpio and Capricorn (150° apart). Conversely, on either side of Gemini lie the signs Taurus and Cancer; thus, Sagittarius is quincunx to Taurus and Cancer. It is not fully 180° (a true opposition within a 360° sphere), but placed just before or after the opposite sign. It shares neither polarity - Yin/assertive or yang/receptive, astrological element - fire, water, air, or earth, or modality - cardinal, fixed, or mutable.

== Golden yod ==
Related to the yod, though much less noticed, is the golden yod. A golden Yod occurs when one planet forms biquintiles (144° aspect) to two others separated by a quintile (72° aspect). Because these aspects are seen as beneficial, the golden yod is seen as reflecting characteristics acquired by the person whose chart contains it. The few astrologers who have studied it regard it as an extremely creatively charged aspect good for artistic skill, especially as quintiles and biquintiles are frequently linked with Neptune. An example of a golden Yod would be with the Sun at 20° Cancer, Uranus at 8° Taurus and Jupiter at 14° Sagittarius.
