= Macclesfield Psalter =

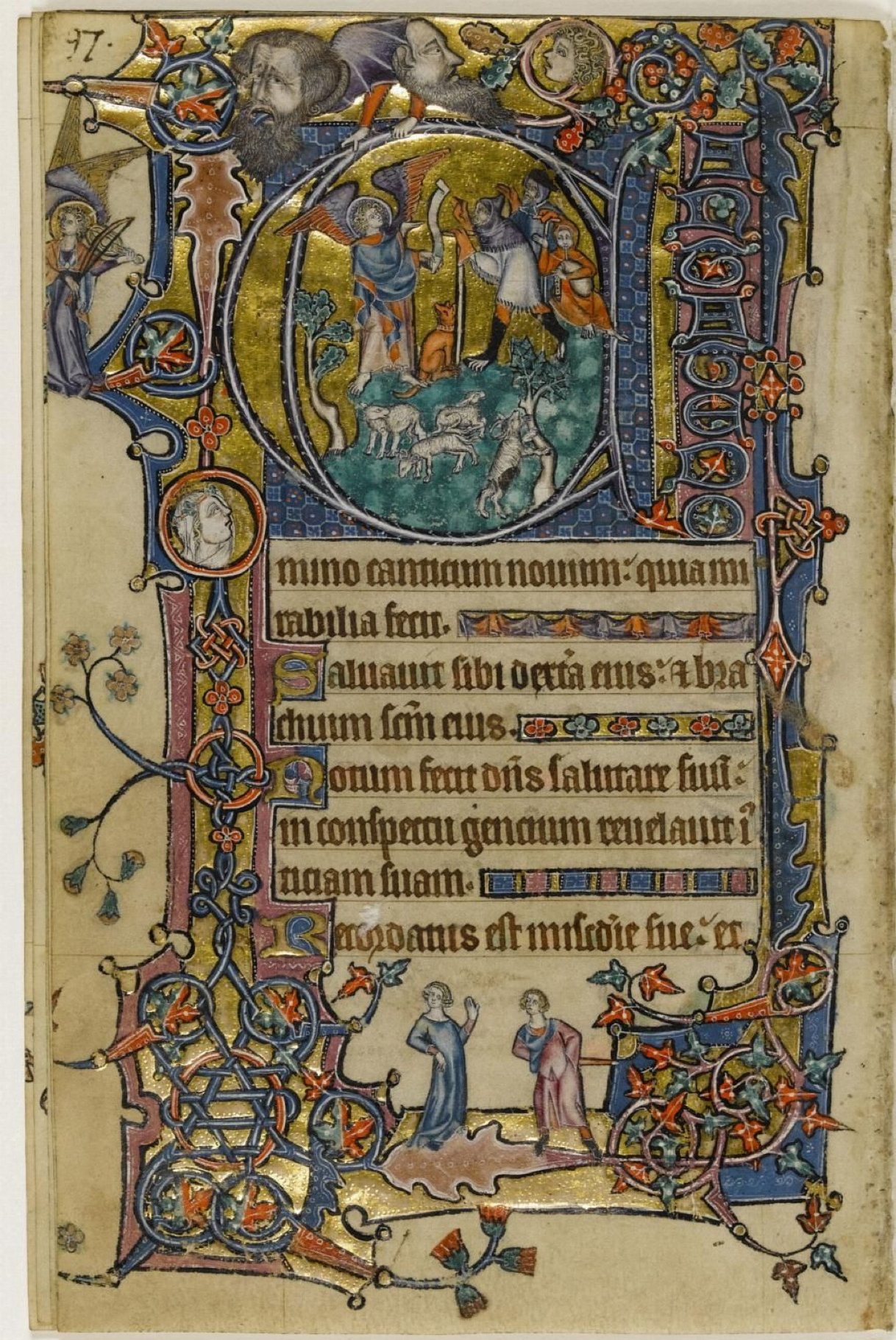
The annunciation to the shepherds in the Macclesfield Psalter

The Macclesfield Psalter is a lavishly illuminated manuscript probably produced c. 1320–30 (Note: Christopher de Hamel suggests that the Macclesfield Psalter 'stands somewhere between the Gorleston and Douai manuscripts', and may be seen as 'a missing link' between the two books.) in East Anglia. The psalter, or book of Psalms, contains 252 beautifully illustrated pages and is named after its most recent owner, the Earl of Macclesfield.

== History ==
The Macclesfield Psalter is regarded as a national treasure of the UK

Having rested unrecognised on the shelves of Shirburn Castle for several centuries, finally revealed when the library was catalogued for sale, the Macclesfield Psalter was put up for auction at Sotheby's in 2004. Cambridge University's Fitzwilliam Museum attempted to purchase the Psalter, but the initial bid was won by the Getty Museum of Malibu, California, for £1.7 million. The Psalter subsequently became a cause célèbre as, under British law, the American museum had to gain permission to export the Psalter. The Reviewing Committee on the Export of Works of Art gave the Psalter a starred rating and a temporary export bar was placed on the Psalter until 10 February 2005. In response, the Fitzwilliam Museum, assisted by an £860,000 contribution from the UK Government's National Heritage Memorial Fund raised the £1.7 million necessary to keep the Psalter in the country. The Psalter, now owned by the Fitzwilliam Museum, was restored, rebound and put on display from 2008.

== Contents ==
The Macclesfield Psalter belongs in the "central tradition of the so-called East Anglian manuscripts, as exemplified by the Gorleston Psalter." Like other luxury psalters, the Macclesfield Psalter was probably intended for private reading instead of public use in church. The scribe is believed to be the same one who executed two other psalters from the East Anglian group, the Stowe Breviary and the Douai Psalter.

This ornament shows Doeg the Edomite beheading the priests of Nob

The chief splendour of the Psalter, however, is indisputably the illumination, which is unusually lavish. There are some full-page miniatures at the start, and throughout the book each new verse begins with a small gilded initial against an ornate background of rose and pink. The initials at the traditional major divisions of the Psalms take up most of the page, and as is usual, the B of "Beatus vir ...", the start of Psalm 1, has the largest of all, a magnificent Jesse Tree. The main initials show religious scenes, either from the life of King David or events from the life of Christ that the Psalms were believed to pre-figure. The smaller initials contain various images, including kings, queens, peasants, and bishops. The margins of many pages are heavily decorated with abstract designs that constantly sprout into plant shapes, and contain many small "marginal grotesques" of no obvious religious relevance.

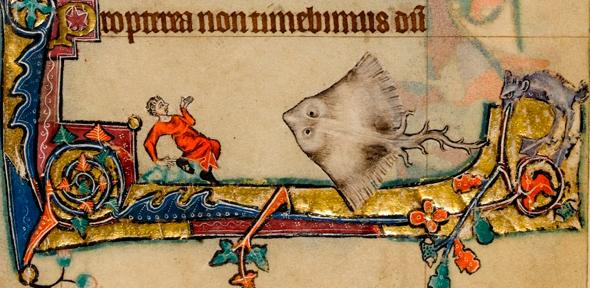
A giant skate terrorises a man; one of many bizarre marginalia features throughout the Psalter.

The Psalter, (noted for its gaudy, vivid images and its coarse Pythonesque humour) abounds in images of grotesques and drolleries. These images include grotesques with faces on their bottoms, three-headed monsters with hairy noses, a dog in a bishop's costume, an ape doctor giving a false diagnosis to a bear patient, rabbits jousting and riding hounds and a giant skate terrorising a man.

Christopher de Hamel of Sotheby's attributes the illumination to one of the artists of the Douai Psalter. Stella Panayotova believes that the versatility displayed in the Macclesfield Psalter's design suggests the involvement of multiple artists and that "at least two assistants decorated the borders and may have painted designs sketched by the Master".

The original patron of the Psalter is unknown, as it appears that a coat of arms has been cut from the pages in various places throughout the Psalter. It is thought that the original owner could possibly have been John de Warenne, 7th Earl of Surrey, the possible patron of the Gorleston Psalter. The Psalter also contains an image of a Dominican friar, who may have been the owner's confessor and may also have been involved in the production of the psalter.

== See also ==
- Gorleston Psalter
