= Stowe Breviary =

Illuminated early 14 century manuscript

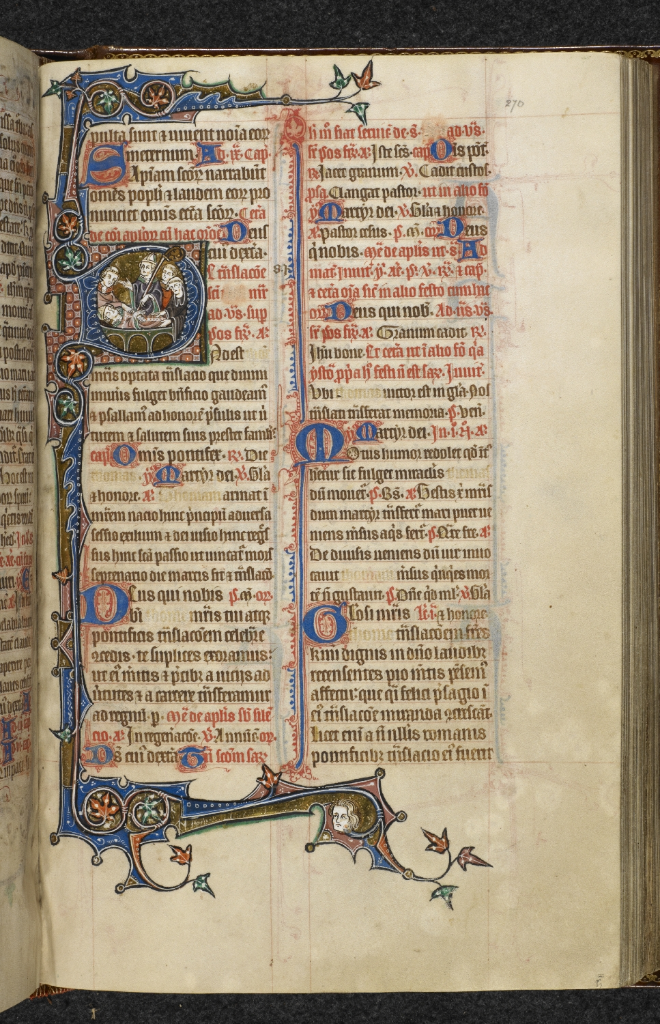
Page from 'Stowe Breviary', Stowe MS 12. Historiated initial depicts the translation of Thomas of Canterbury.

The Stowe Breviary (British Library, Stowe MS 12) is an early-fourteenth-century illuminated manuscript Breviary from England, providing the divine office according to the Sarum ordinal and calendar (with Norwich additions).

It is thought to be by the same scribe as the Macclesfield Psalter and the Douai Psalter. The use of the same dyes, paints, and similar iconography supports this. The manuscript forms part of the Stowe manuscripts in the British Library.
