= Gorleston Psalter =

14th century English manuscript

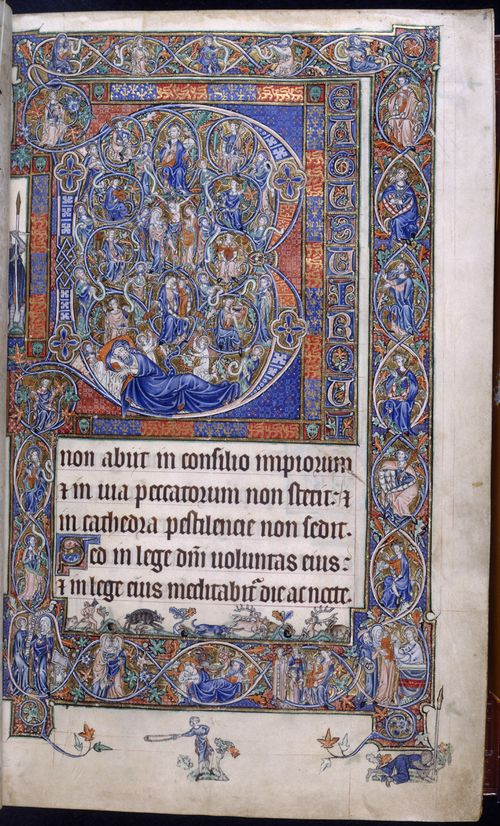
The Tree of Jesse initial, bordered by the royal arms of England and France (fol. 8r).

The Gorleston Psalter (British Library Add MS 49622) is a 14th-century manuscript notable for containing early music instruction and for its humorous marginalia. It is named for the town of Gorleston-on-Sea in Norfolk.

== Description ==
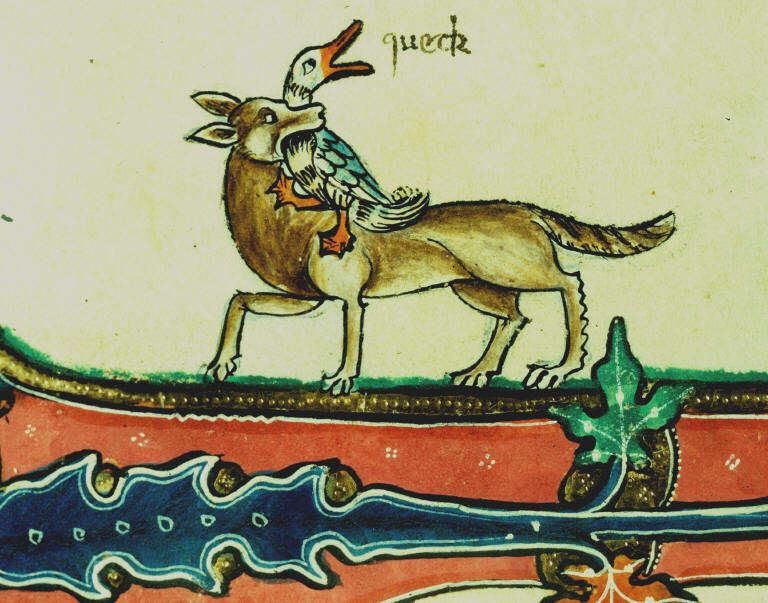
Marginalia: a fox carries a goose

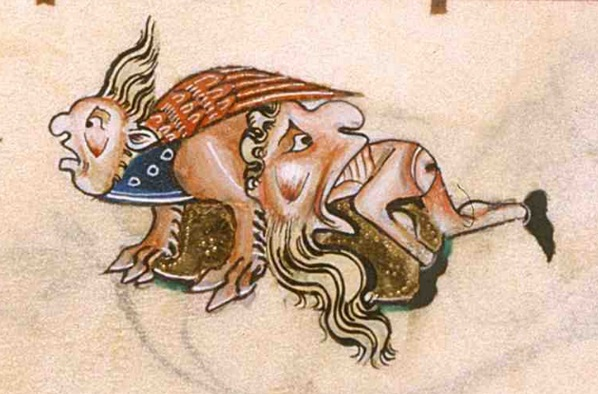
Marginalia in Gorleston Psalter

The Gorleston Psalter is richly illustrated, with frequent illuminations, as well as many bas-de-page (bottom-of-the-page) illustrations or drolleries as marginalia.

The bulk of the manuscript is taken up by the psalms (foll. 8r–190v), which is preceded by a calendar (1r–6v, with twelve roundels) and a prayer (7v), and followed by a canticles (190v–206r), an Athanasian Creed (206r–208v), a litany (208v–214r), collects (214r–214v), an Office of the Dead (223v–225v), prayers (223v–225v), a hymn (225v–226r), and a litany (226r–228r).

The prayer on fol. 7v, Suscipere dignare domine dues omnipotens hos psalmos quos ego indignus peccator, was added after the manuscript passed to Norwich Cathedral Priory, along with a miniature of the crucifixion on vol. 7r, as was the litany on foll. 226r–228r, similar to the litany in the Ormesby Psalter. There are thirteen large historiated initials, marking the beginning of Psalms 1, 26, 38, 51, 52, 68, 80, 97, 101, 109, 119, the beginning of Canticles, and the Office of the Dead (showing the funeral of a bishop), besides 145 historiated minor initials. The Beatus initial to Psalm 1 (a B for beatus), shows the Tree of Jesse surrounded by a border showing the arms of England and France (fol. 8r).

One famous image from the Psalter shows a fox carrying a goose away in its mouth, while the goose says queck. The scene is probably an allusion to the tale of Reynard the Fox. Armorial illustrations showing in the manuscript have been identified as those of Roger Bigod, (f. 70b), Gilbert Peche, (f. 86), and Aymer de Valence, (f. 107v).

Written in Latin in at least three separate hands, the Psalter consists of the original text from its creation in around 1310, with a few later additions. The added material is a prayer before the psalter on f.7b and an added litany, ff. 226b–228. The first hand in the manuscript is identified as being the scribe of the original work, with two later hands identified as being responsible for the additions c. 1320-1325. The first of these two later hands has been co-identified with the text hand of the Stowe Breviary and Douai Psalter. The third hand, that of the prayer on f.7b, is described as smaller and much more irregular and unsteady.

Nigel Morgan, in his catalogue of a 1973 exhibition in Norwich, has drawn attention to stylistic similarities between the Gorleston Psalter and the Stowe Breviary, Douai Psalter, Castle Acre Psalter (Yale University Library, MS. 417), and the Escorial Psalter (Escorial MS. Q II 6.). It is believed that the Gorleston Psalter is an earlier output from the scriptorum that later produced the Stowe Breviary, Douai Psalter, and the Escorial Psalter.

== Date ==
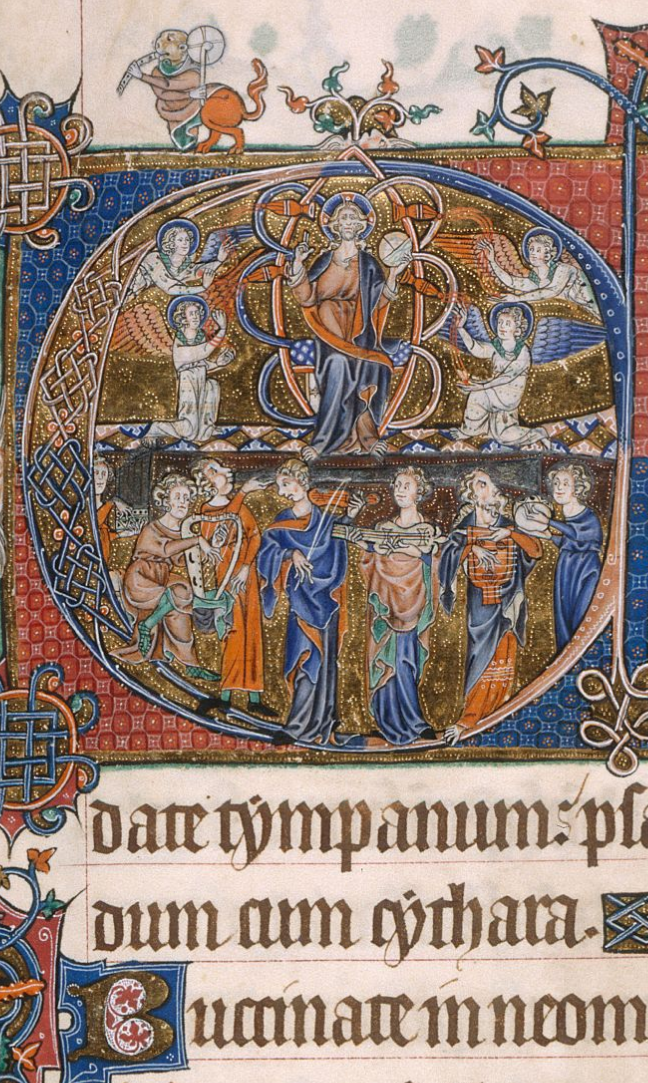
Illustrated letter from the Gorleston Psalter. The instruments on the bottom include (from the left) an unknown instrument, harp, singer, rebec, citole, psaltery, tambourine or drum.

It is believed to have been made in the first quarter of the 14th century for someone associated with the parish church of St Andrew at Gorleston. This association is deduced from the inclusion of the Dedication of Gorleston Church on March 8 in the psalter's calendar. Dating of the manuscript is partially based on the omission of Thomas of Hereford from this calendar. Thomas was canonised in 1320, and his feast is noted in the Stowe Breviary and Douai Psalter whose calendars otherwise closely match the one in the Gorleston Psalter. The earliest date has been derived from the arms of England and France, which are shown in association on the Beatus page, leading experts to conclude that it was not executed before the marriage of Edward I to Margaret of France in 1299. Cockerell proposed a date of c.1306 for the manuscript based on an association of the repeated image of an elderly bearded layman with Roger Bigod, 5th Earl of Norfolk (died 1306), whose armorial shield appears on f. 70b close to one of the images of the layman. Other dates proposed include c. 1320 by N.J. Morgan, and L.F. Sandler proposes a date of c. 1310 – c. 1320 arguing that the Bigod armorial refers to the Thetford Priory (which also used the arms) rather than Roger Bigod.

== History ==
The manuscript was originally owned by the church of St. Andrew, Gorleston, but passed to Norwich Cathedral Priory around 1320–25, where it is believed to have remained until dissolution in the Reformation. Following this it passed to the Cornwallis family, for which evidence of ownership is provided by an inscription of Sir Thomas Cornwallis (1519–1604) on the first folio, and an armorial bookplate of the family on the front pastedown. Following the death of Charles Cornwallis, 2nd Marquess Cornwallis in 1823 without male issue, the psalter was presented by his daughters to Richard Griffin, 3rd Baron Braybrooke. Braybrooke was the husband of Jane Cornwallis, eldest daughter of the 2nd Marquess. To record this event an inscription was added to the first flyleaf, signed by Jane, Louisa, Jemima, Mary and Elizabeth Cornwallis, reading "This Missal originally the property of Sir Thomas Cornwalleys from whom it descended to the Daughters and Coheiresses of Charles 2nd Marquis Cornwallis was by them presented to the Honble Richard Neville as a token of their regard & affection 1823". In 1904 Henry Neville, 7th Baron Braybrooke sold the Psalter to C.W. Dyson Perrins, who later bequeathed it, with other manuscripts, to the British Museum (now the British Library).
