= Codex Vyssegradensis =

11th-century illuminated Gospel Book

Codex of Vyšehrad
- Prague, National Library of the Czech Republic (XIV A 13)
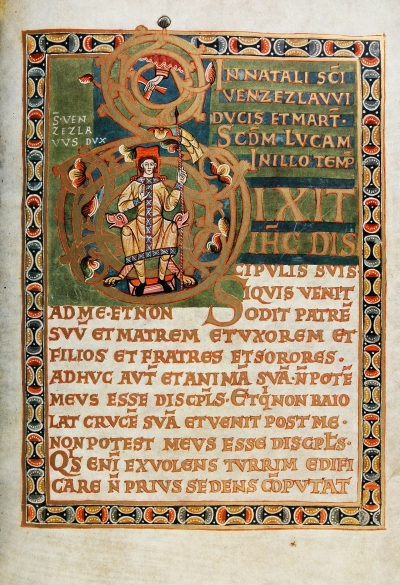
- St. Wenceslaus in the initial. The new Bohemian monarchy uses the crowning haloed Hand of God in the Coronation Gospels of Vratislav II
- Type: Evangeliary
- Date: cca 1070-1086
- Place of origin: Bavaria ?
- Language(s): Latin
- Patron: King Vratislaus of Bohemia ?
- Material: Parchment
- Size: 108 leaves
- Format: 41,5 x 32 cm
- Previously kept: Vyšehrad; Prague Metropolitan Chapter Library

The Vyšehrad Codex (Czech: Kodex vyšehradský; Latin Codex Vyssegradensis), also known as the Coronation Gospels of King Vratislaus, is a late 11th-century illuminated Romanesque Gospel Book, which is considered the most important and most valuable manuscript kept in Bohemia (Czech Republic). Its extremely rich iconography and its visual components rank it among the most precious illuminated manuscripts of the second half of the 11th century in Europe. It was probably made at the order of Czech diplomats to honour an anniversary of the Czech King Vratislav's coronation which took place in 1085 (Vratislav was the first king of Bohemia, which was previously a dukedom). The codex is of Danubian provenance, and closely related to three other surviving manuscripts – two of them now in Poland and one in the Prague Chapter Library. They probably originated in the circle of the scriptorium at the Monastery of St. Emmeram in Regensburg. The manuscript is now located in the Czech National Library, Prague under the signature XIV A 13. In 2005 it was declared as a National cultural monument of the Czech Republic.

The earliest known representation of the Tree of Jesse is in the book. In a paper analysing this image, J.A. Hayes Williams points out that the iconography employed is very different from that usually found in such images, which she argues relates to an assertion of the rightful kingship of the royal patron. The page showing the Jesse Tree is accompanied by a number of other illuminated pages of which four depict the Ancestors of Christ. The Jesse Tree has not been used to support a number of figures, as is usual. Instead, the passage from Isaiah has been depicted in a very literal way. In the picture, the prophet Isaiah approaches Jesse from beneath whose feet is springing a tree, and wraps around him a banner with words upon it which translate literally as: "A little rod from Jesse gives rise to a splendid flower", following the language of the Vulgate. Instead of the ancestors seen in later depictions, seven doves (with haloes) perch in the branches. These, in a motif from Byzantine art, represent the Seven gifts of the Holy Spirit as described by the Apostle Paul. Williams go on to compare it with two other famous images, the Tree of Jesse window at Chartres Cathedral and the Lambeth Bible in England.
