= Tree of Jesse =

Artistic depiction of the family tree of Jesus

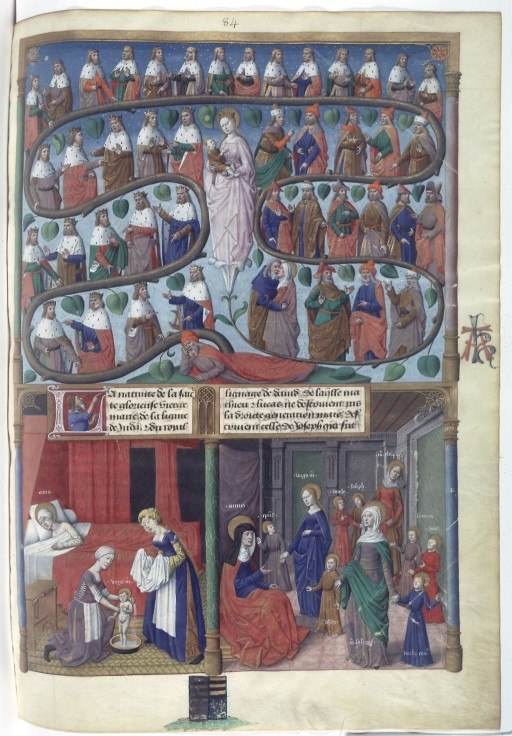
Miniature, Jacques de Besançon, Paris, c.1485. Showing 43 generations. Below, the birth and childhood of Mary

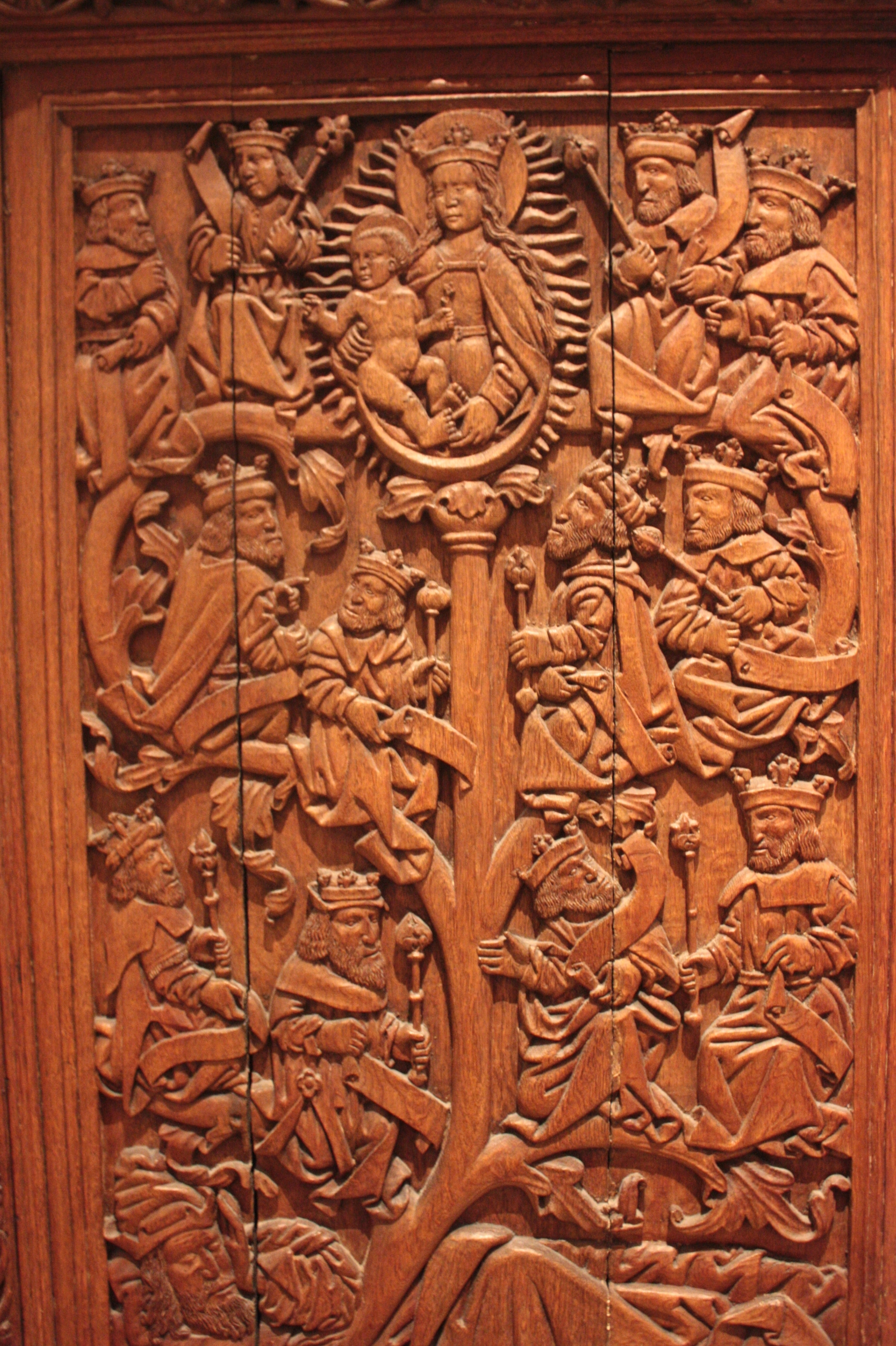
A 17th-century oak carving of the Tree of Jesse from St Andrews Castle, Royal Scottish Museum

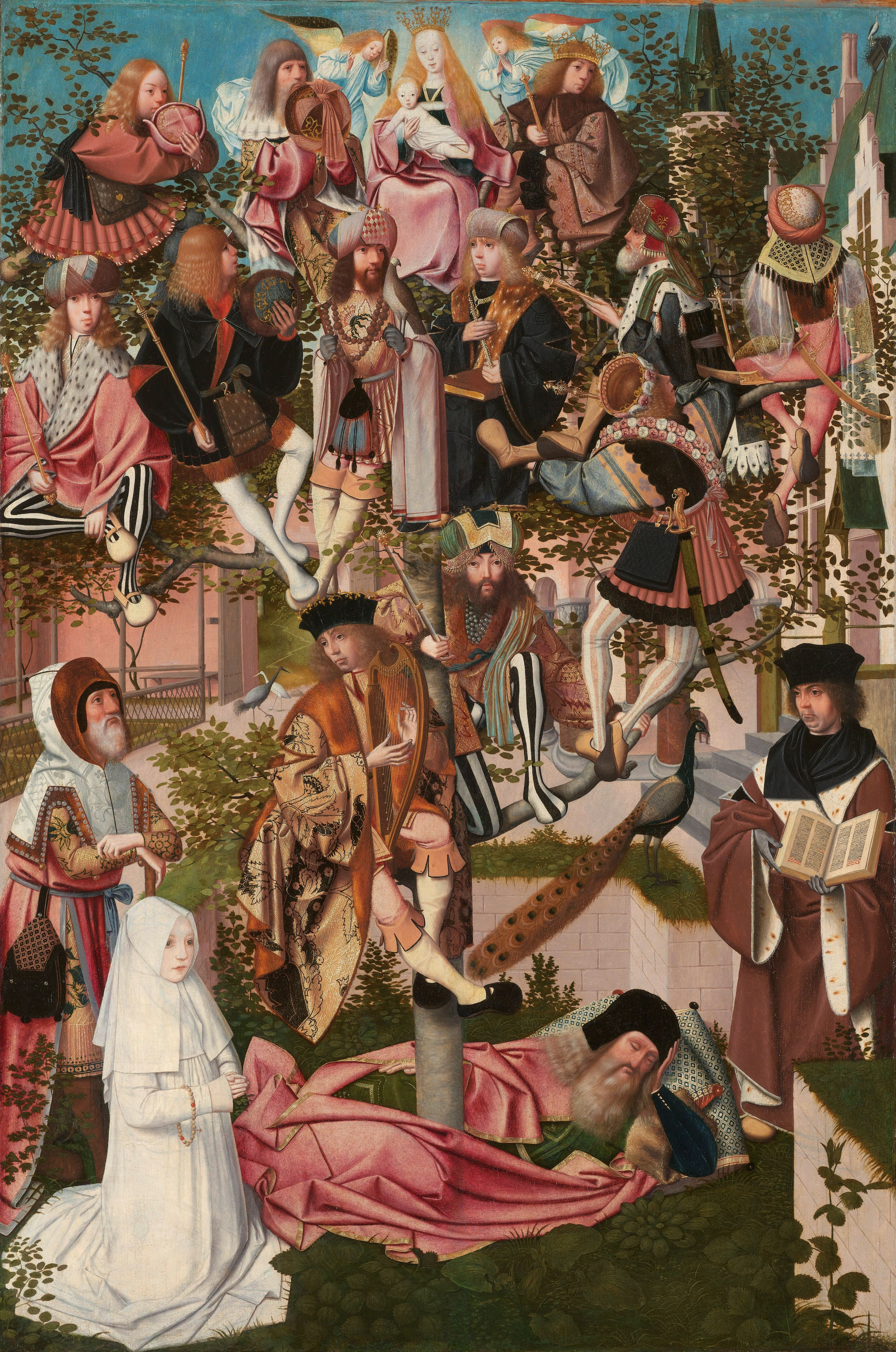
(Painter related to) Geertgen tot Sint Jans, c. 1500, oil on panel

The Tree of Jesse is a depiction in art of the ancestors of Jesus Christ, shown in a branching tree which rises from Jesse of Bethlehem, the father of King David. It is the original use of the family tree as a schematic representation of a genealogy.

The Tree of Jesse originates in a passage in the biblical Book of Isaiah 11:1 which describes metaphorically the descent of the Messiah and is accepted by Christians as referring to Jesus. The various figures depicted in the lineage of Jesus are drawn from those names listed in the Gospel of Matthew and the Gospel of Luke.

The subject is often seen in Christian art, particularly in that of the medieval period. The earliest example is an illuminated manuscript that dates from the 11th century. There are many examples in medieval psalters, because of the relation to King David, son of Jesse, and writer of the Psalms. Other examples include stained glass windows, stone carvings around the portals of medieval cathedrals, and painting on walls and ceilings. The Tree of Jesse also appears in smaller art forms such as embroideries and ivories.

== Origins ==
Depictions of the Jesse Tree are based on a passage from the Book of Isaiah.

"And there shall come forth a rod out of the stem of Jesse, and a Branch shall grow out of his roots" (King James Version).

From the Latin Vulgate Bible used in the Middle Ages:

et egredietur virga de radice Iesse et flos de radice eius ascendet (Isaiah 11:1).

Flos, pl flores is Latin for flower. Virga is a "green twig", "rod" or "broom", as well as a convenient near-pun with Virgo or Virgin, which undoubtedly influenced the development of the image. Thus Jesus is the Virga Jesse or "stem of Jesse".

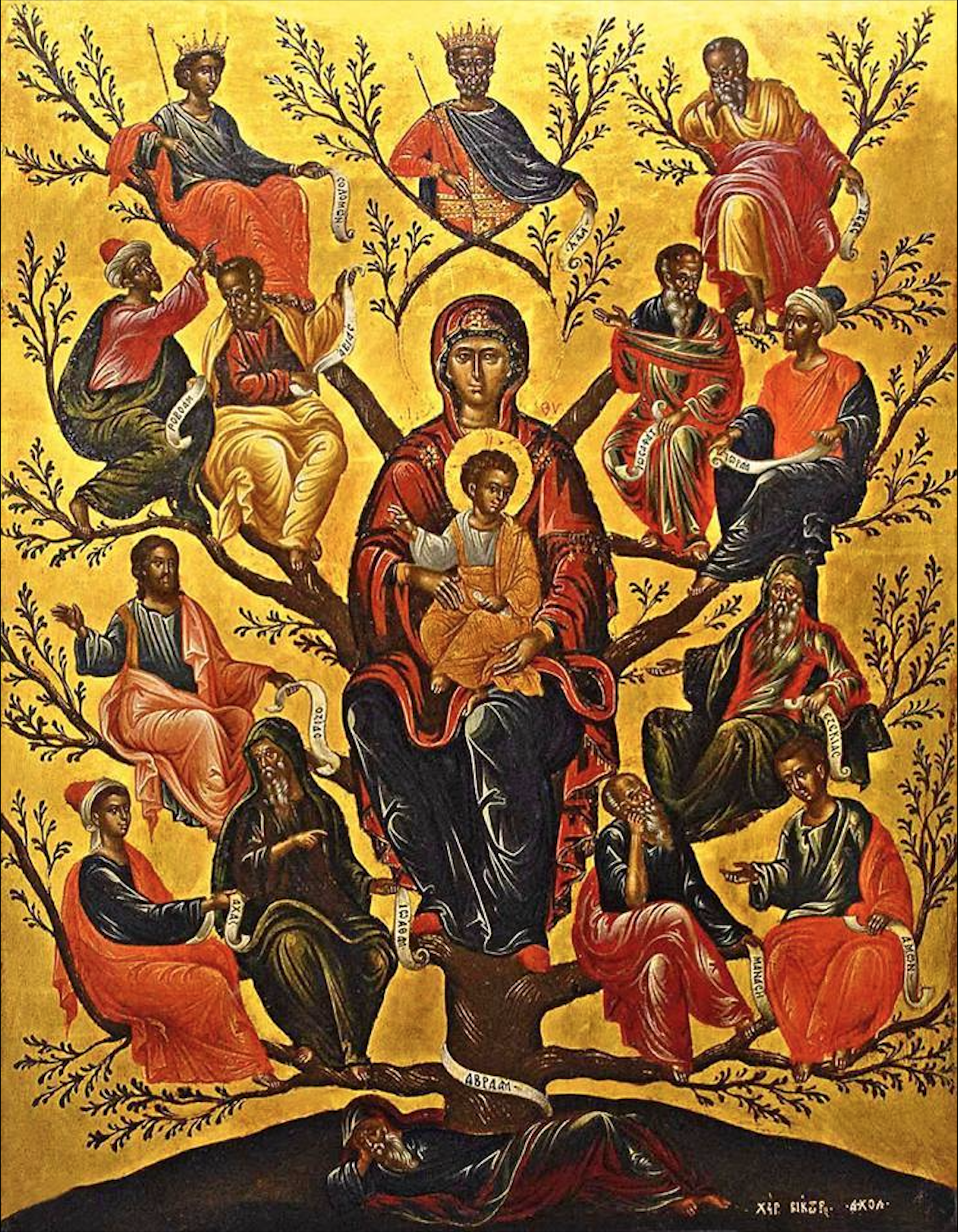
Tree of Jesse by Victor, 1674, it features David, Solomon and the Davidic Line with Abraham as its root

In the New Testament the lineage of Jesus is traced by two of the Gospel writers, Matthew in descending order, and Luke in ascending order. Luke's Gospel's description in chapter 3 begins with Jesus himself and is traced all the way back, via Nathan to David and then on to "Adam, which was [the son] of God.". (Luke 3:23–38) Matthew's Gospel opens with the words: "The book of the generation of Jesus Christ, the son of David, the son of Abraham." (Matthew 1:1) With this beginning, Matthew shows the Abrahamic and royal descent, passing through David, but then through Solomon.

See Genealogy of Jesus for more explanation of the differences, but both lineages permit the interpretation that Jesus is the "stem of Jesse" by his descent from Jesse's son, David.

== Use ==
Pictorial representations of the Jesse Tree show a symbolic tree or vine with spreading branches to represent the genealogy in accordance with Isaiah's prophecy. The 12th-century monk Hervaeus expressed the medieval understanding of the image, based on the Vulgate text: "The patriarch Jesse belonged to the royal family, that is why the root of Jesse signifies the lineage of kings. As to the rod, it symbolises Mary as the flower symbolises Jesus Christ." In the medieval period, when heredity was all-important, much greater emphasis than today was placed on the actual royal descent of Jesus, especially by royalty and the nobility, including those who had joined the clergy. Between them, these groups were responsible for much of the patronage of the arts.

During the Medieval era the symbol of the tree as an expression of lineage was adopted by the nobility and has passed into common usage initially in the form of the family tree and later as a mode of expressing any line of descent. The form is widely used as a table in such disciplines as biology. It is also used to show lines of responsibility in personnel structures such as government departments.

== Modes of depiction ==
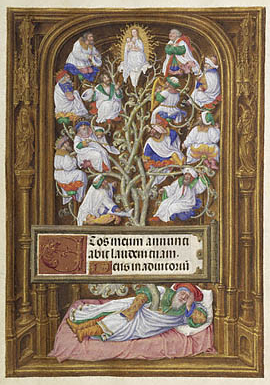
A typical Jesse Tree of the Late Medieval period, detail of the Spinola Hours of Ludwig by the Master of James IV of Scotland, (1510-20)

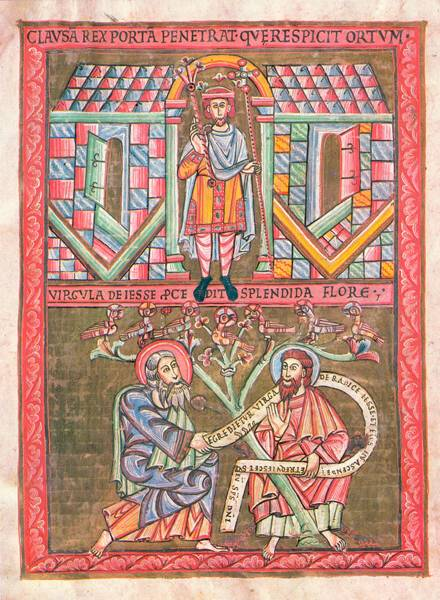
The lower half of this page from the Vyšehrad Codex shows the earliest known depiction of a Tree of Jesse

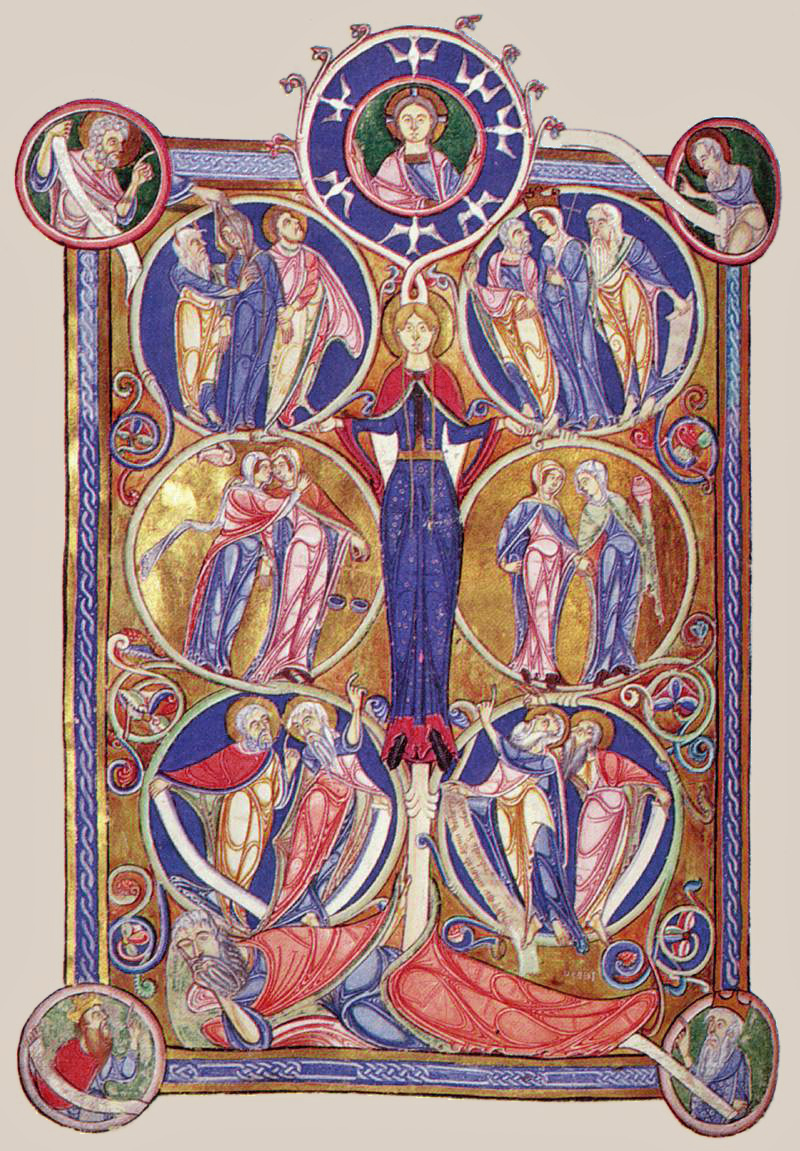
The Jesse Tree in the Lambeth Bible, unknown English miniaturist (1140s). Many characteristics of later representations are fully developed.

The Jesse Tree has been depicted in almost every medium of Christian art. In particular, it is the subject of many stained glass windows and illuminated manuscripts. It is also found in wall paintings, architectural carvings, funerary monuments, floor tiles and embroidery. Generally only a few of the most well-known individuals, like Kings David and Solomon, are represented on Jesse Trees, rather than an attempt to display the entire lineage.

The first representations of the passage in Isaiah, from about 1000 AD in the West, show a "shoot" in the form of a straight stem or a flowering branch held in the hand most often by the Virgin, or by Jesus when held by Mary, by the prophet Isaiah or by an ancestor figure. The shoot as an attribute acted as a reminder of the prophecy, see also the tradition, apparently older, of the Golden Rose given by the Pope. In the Byzantine world, the Tree figures only as a normal-looking tree in the background of some Nativity scenes, also a reminder to the viewer. Indeed, the Tree was always far more common in Northern Europe, where it may have originated, than in Italy.

There exist also other forms of representation of the Genealogy of Jesus which do not employ the Jesse Tree, the most famous being that painted in the Sistine Chapel by Michelangelo.

The typical form of the image

The most typical form which the Jesse Tree takes is to show the figure of Jesse, often larger than all the rest, reclining or sleeping (perhaps by analogy to Adam when his rib was taken) at the foot of the pictorial space. From his side or his navel springs the trunk of a tree or vine which ascends, branching to either side. On the branches, usually surrounded by formally scrolling tendrils of foliage, are figures representing the ancestors of Christ. The trunk generally ascends vertically to Mary and then Christ at the top.

The number of figures depicted varies greatly, depending on the amount of room available for the design. As a maximum, if the longer ancestry from Luke is used, there are 43 generations between Jesse and Jesus. The identity of the figures also varies, and may not be specified, but Solomon and David are usually included, and often all shown wear crowns. Most Jesse Trees include Mary immediately beneath the figure of Jesus (or, in the Gothic period, show a Virgin and Child), emphasising that she was the means by which the shoot of Jesse was born. See for example, Sermon 24 of St Leo the Great: "In which rod, no doubt the blessed Virgin Mary is predicted, who sprung from the stock of Jesse and David and fecundated by the Holy Ghost, brought forth a new flower of human flesh, becoming a virgin-mother". Saint Joseph is rarely shown, although unlike Mary he is a link in the Gospel genealogies. It was believed in the Middle Ages that the House of David could only marry within itself, and that she was independently descended from Jesse. Sometimes Jesus and other figures are shown in the cups of flowers, as the fruit or blossom of the Tree.

The Jesse Tree was the only prophecy in the Old Testament to be so literally and frequently illustrated, and so came also to stand for the Prophets, and their foretelling of Christ, in general. Both the St-Denis and Chartres windows include columns of prophets, as do many depictions. Often they carry banderoles with a quotation from their writings, and they may point to Christ, as the foretold Messiah. The inclusion of kings and prophets was also an assertion of the inclusion and relevance in the biblical canon of books that some groups had rejected in the past.

While particularly popular in the Medieval era, there were also many depictions of the Jesse Tree in Gothic Revival art of the 19th century. The 20th century has also produced a number of fine examples.

== Illuminated manuscripts ==
=== The Vysehrad Codex and Lambeth Palace Bible ===
The earliest known representation of the Jesse Tree can be firmly dated to 1086 and is in the Vyšehrad Codex, the Coronation Gospels of Vratislav II, the first king of Bohemia, which was previously a dukedom.

In a paper analysing this image, J.A. Hayes Williams points out that the iconography employed is very different from that usually found in such images, which she argues relates to an assertion of the rightful kingship of the royal patron. The page showing the Jesse Tree is accompanied by a number of other illuminated pages of which four depict the Ancestors of Christ. The Jesse Tree has not been used to support a number of figures, as is usual. Instead, the passage from Isaiah has been depicted in a very literal way. In the picture, the prophet Isaiah approaches Jesse from beneath whose feet is springing a tree, and wraps around him a banner with words upon it which translate literally as:- "A little rod from Jesse gives rise to a splendid flower", following the language of the Vulgate. Instead of the ancestors seen in later depictions, seven doves (with haloes) perch in the branches. These, in a motif from Byzantine art, represent the Seven gifts of the Holy Spirit as described by the Apostle Paul. Williams goes on to compare it with two other famous images, the Tree of Jesse window at Chartres Cathedral and the Lambeth Bible in England.

Williams says:-

"While depictions of the Jesse Tree originated in Bohemia, the concept became widely popular throughout Europe and the British Isles. Within sixty years the composition had exploded and expanded, with rearranged original elements and new ones added."

However this claim of Bohemian origin may be somewhat overstated, as there is an incipient version in an Anglo-Norman manuscript of similar date to the Vysehrad Codex.

In the first decades of the 12th century, the early Cistercian illuminators of Cîteaux Abbey played an important part in the development of the image of the Tree of Jesse, which was used to counter renewed tendencies to deny the humanity of Mary, which culminated in Catharism. However, as Bernard of Clairvaux, strongly hostile to imagery, increased in influence in the order, their use of imagery ceased. The Lambeth Bible is dated between 1140 and 1150. The Jesse Tree illustration comes at the start of Isaiah and differs greatly from the earlier one, having much more the form that is familiar from both manuscript and stained glass versions. In it, Jesse lies at the border of the page with the tree springing from his side. The branches of the tree are depicted as highly formalised circular tendrils which enclose six pairs or trios of figures. At the centre, tall and highly stylised in the same manner as 12th-century columnar statues, stands a full-length Blessed Virgin Mary from whose head spring tendrils which enclose a bust of her Son, Jesus. He is encircled by the seven doves, with outspread wings; this became the usual depiction of them. Four Prophets with scrolls occupy medallions in the corners.

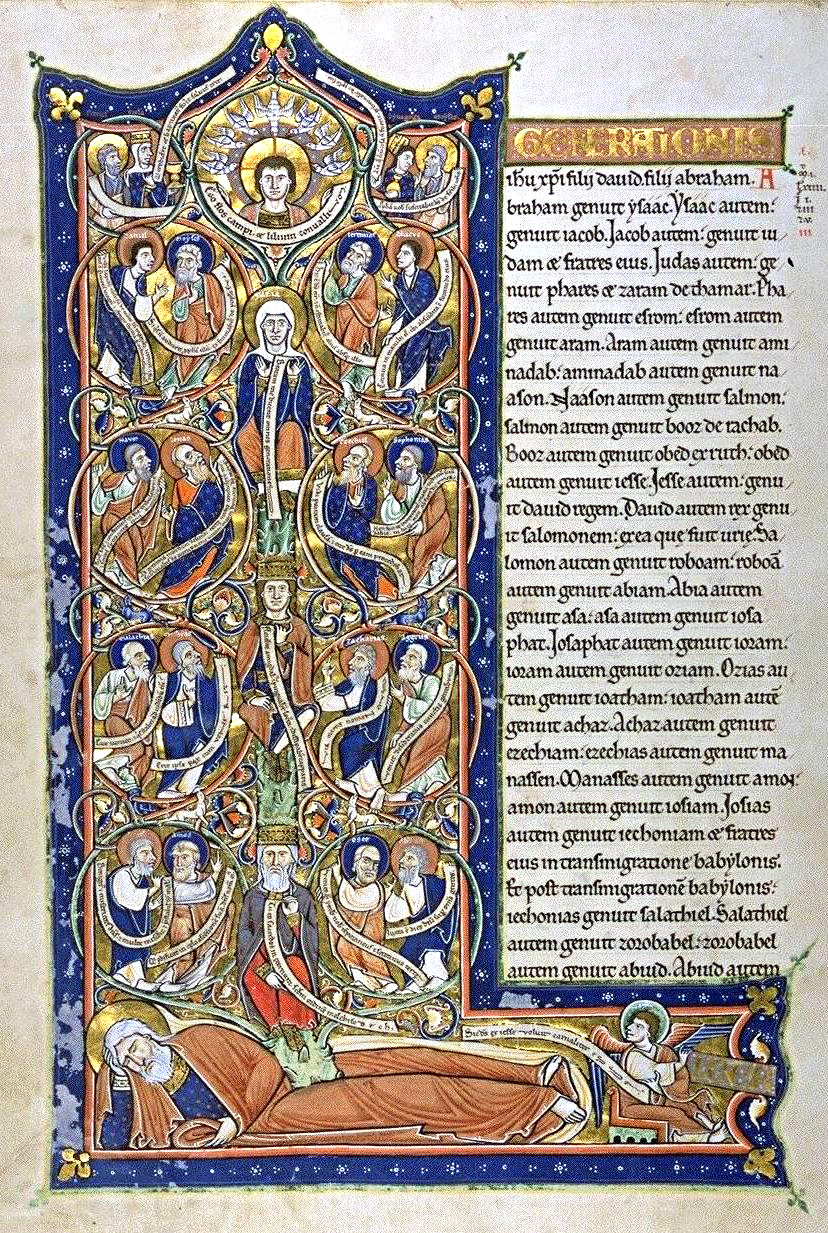
Capuchin's Bible, c. 1180, Bibliothèque nationale de France, Paris

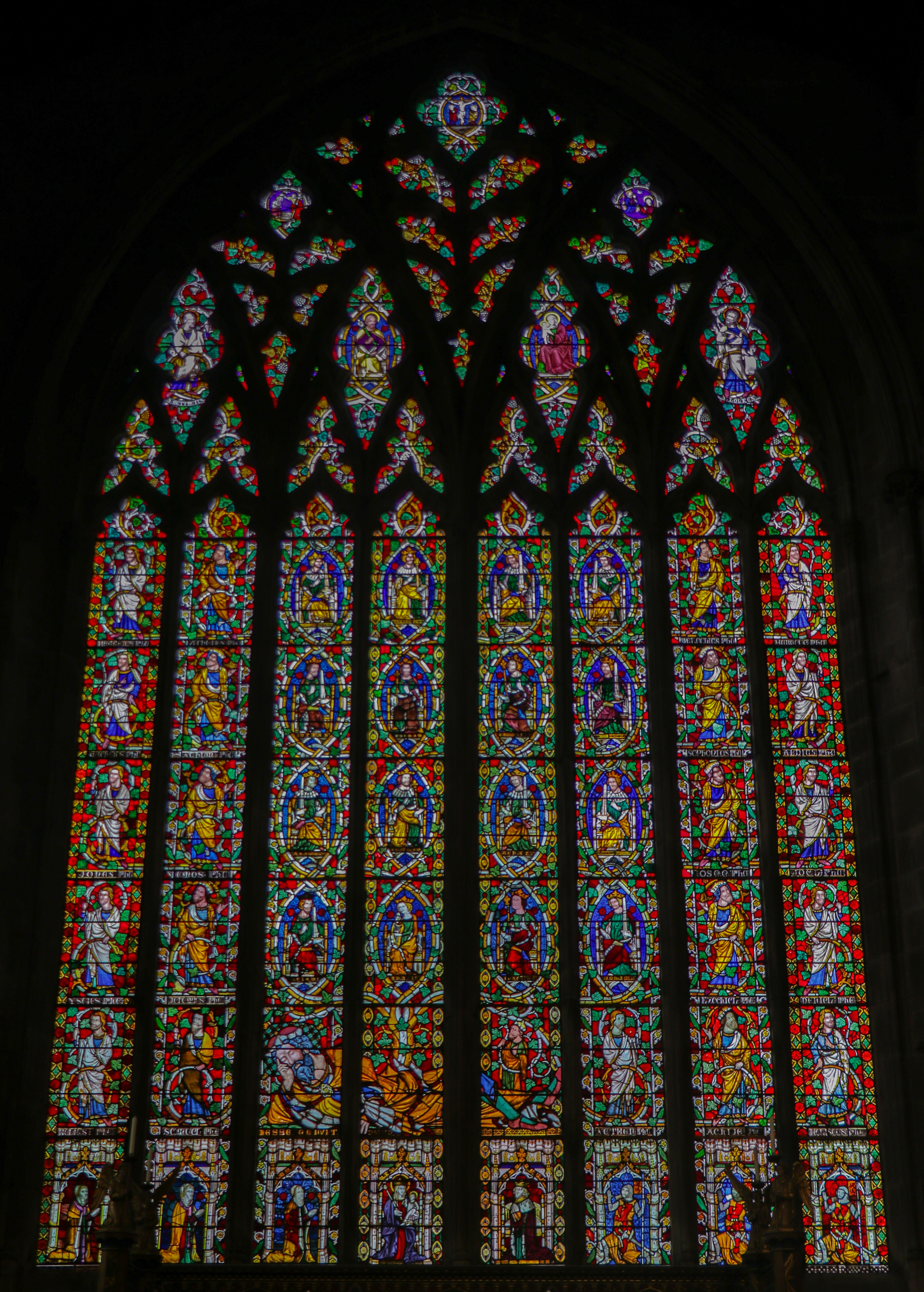
The world-famous medieval Jesse Window at St Mary's Shrewsbury

=== Other illuminated manuscripts ===
The Tree appears in several other Romanesque Bibles apart from the Lambeth Bible, usually as a large historiated initial at the start of either Isaiah or Matthew. The Saint-Bénigne Bible is perhaps the earliest appearance, with just Jesse and the doves of the "Seven Gifts". The Capuchin's Bible (see picture) is a later example, c. 1180, in which a Jesse Tree forms the L of Liber generationis.. at the start of the Gospel of Matthew.

The Tree is also often found in Psalters, especially English manuscripts, illustrating the B initial of Beatus Vir, the beginning of Psalm 1, which often occupies a whole page. Sometimes this is the only fully illuminated page, and if it is historiated (i.e. contains a pictured scene) the Tree is the usual subject. When not historiated, the initial had for about two hundred years been most often made up of, or filled with, spiraling plant tendrils, often with animals or men caught up in them, so the development to the tree was a relatively easy step. Indeed, although Jesse's son David was believed to be the author of the Psalms, it has been suggested that the tradition of using a Jesse Tree here arose largely because it was an imposing design that worked well filling a large B shape.

An early example is the late 12th-century Huntingfield Psalter, and an especially splendid one from the early 14th century is the Gorleston Psalter in the British Library. In these and most other examples Jesse lies at the bottom of the B, and the Virgin is no larger than other figures. In the recently re-discovered Macclesfield Psalter of about 1320 another very elaborate Tree grows beyond the B, sending branches round the sides and bottom of the text. In the Psalter and Hours of John, Duke of Bedford (British Library Add MS 42131), of about 1420–23, the Tree frames the bottom and both sides of the page, while the initial B at the top of the page contains the anointing of King David.

Some continental manuscripts give the scene a whole page with no initial. "Various selections" of the elements appear, and prophets and sometimes even the Cumaean Sybil (Ingeburg Psalter c. 1210) stand in the corners or to the side. A Lectionary of before 1164 from Cologne unusually shows Jesse dead in a tomb or coffin, from which the tree grows. Romanesque depictions usually show Jesse asleep on open ground or on a simple couch - all that can be told from the Bible about his circumstances is that he had sheep, which David herded. By the Gothic period small Trees are found in many types of manuscript, and Jesse is often more comfortably accommodated in a large bed.

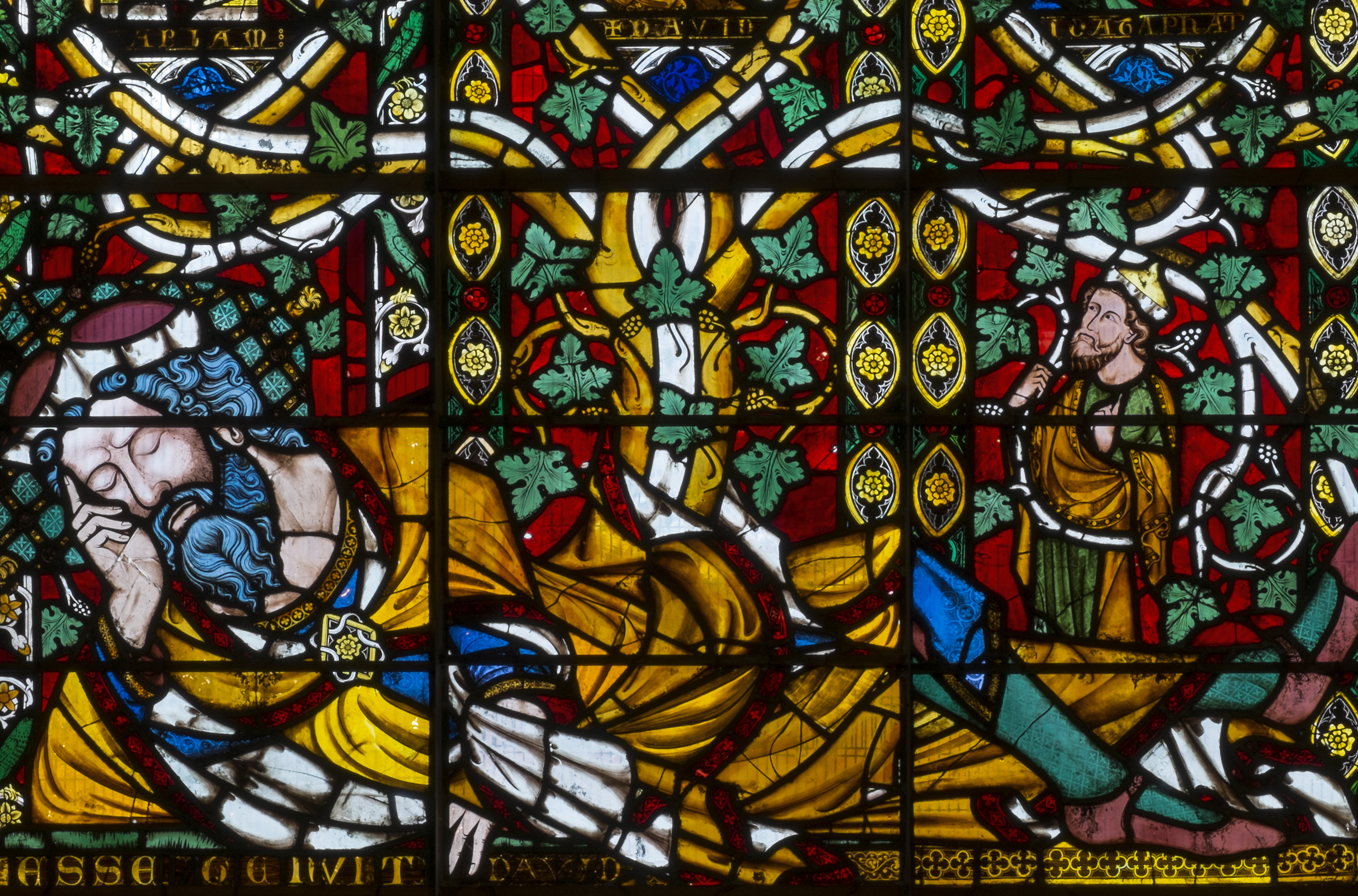
The fourteenth-century 'Jesse window' at St Mary's Church Shrewsbury

== Stained glass ==
Stained glass was a popular medium used in many eras to illuminate the sacred mysteries of the Old Covenant's relationship with the genealogy of Christ in the New Covenant.

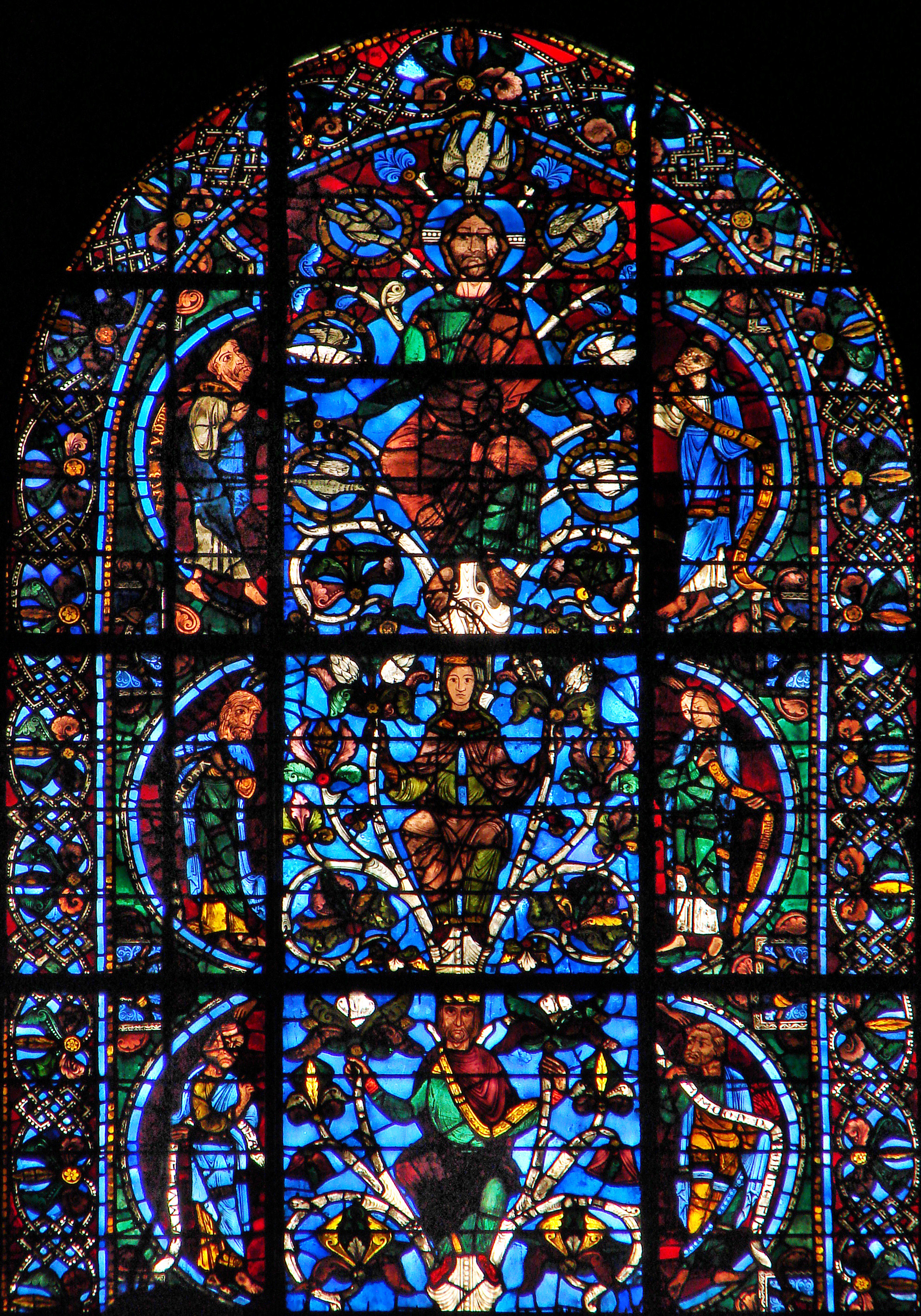
The upper section of the Jesse Tree window at Chartres Cathedral showing Jesus at the apex and Mary below him

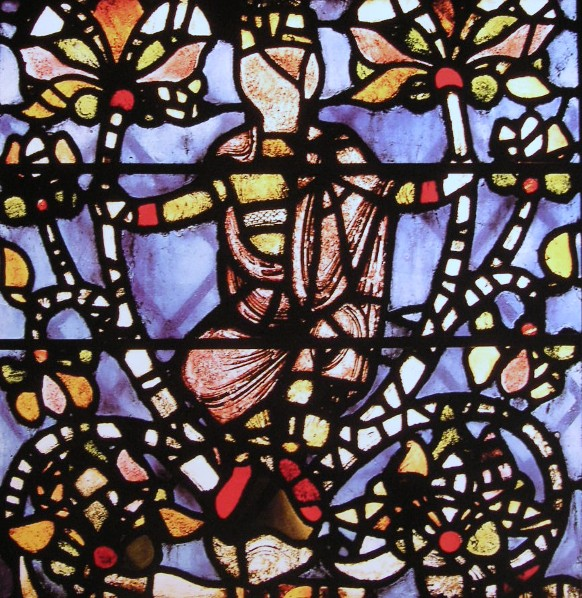
The fragment of a Jesse Tree window from York Minster, which is probably the oldest panel of stained glass in England (c. 1170)

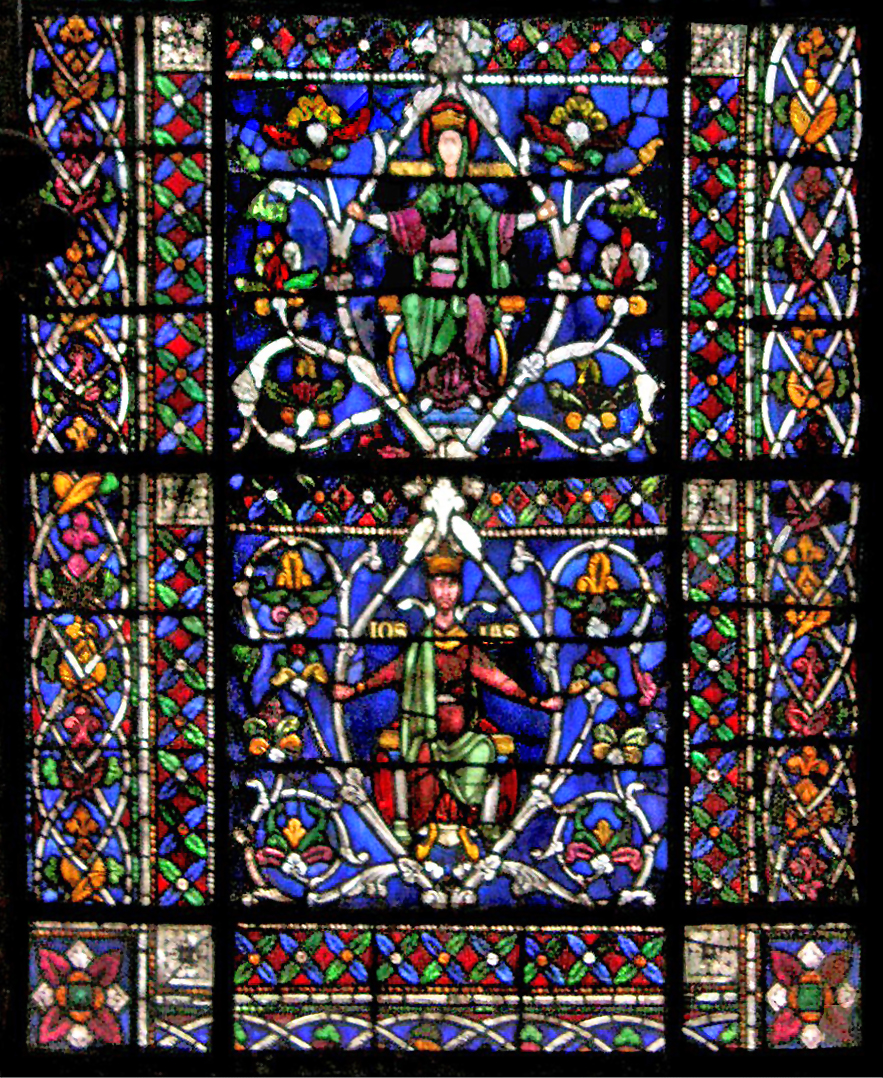
Two panels, all that remain, of a Jesse Tree window of the late 12th or early 13th century, Canterbury Cathedral

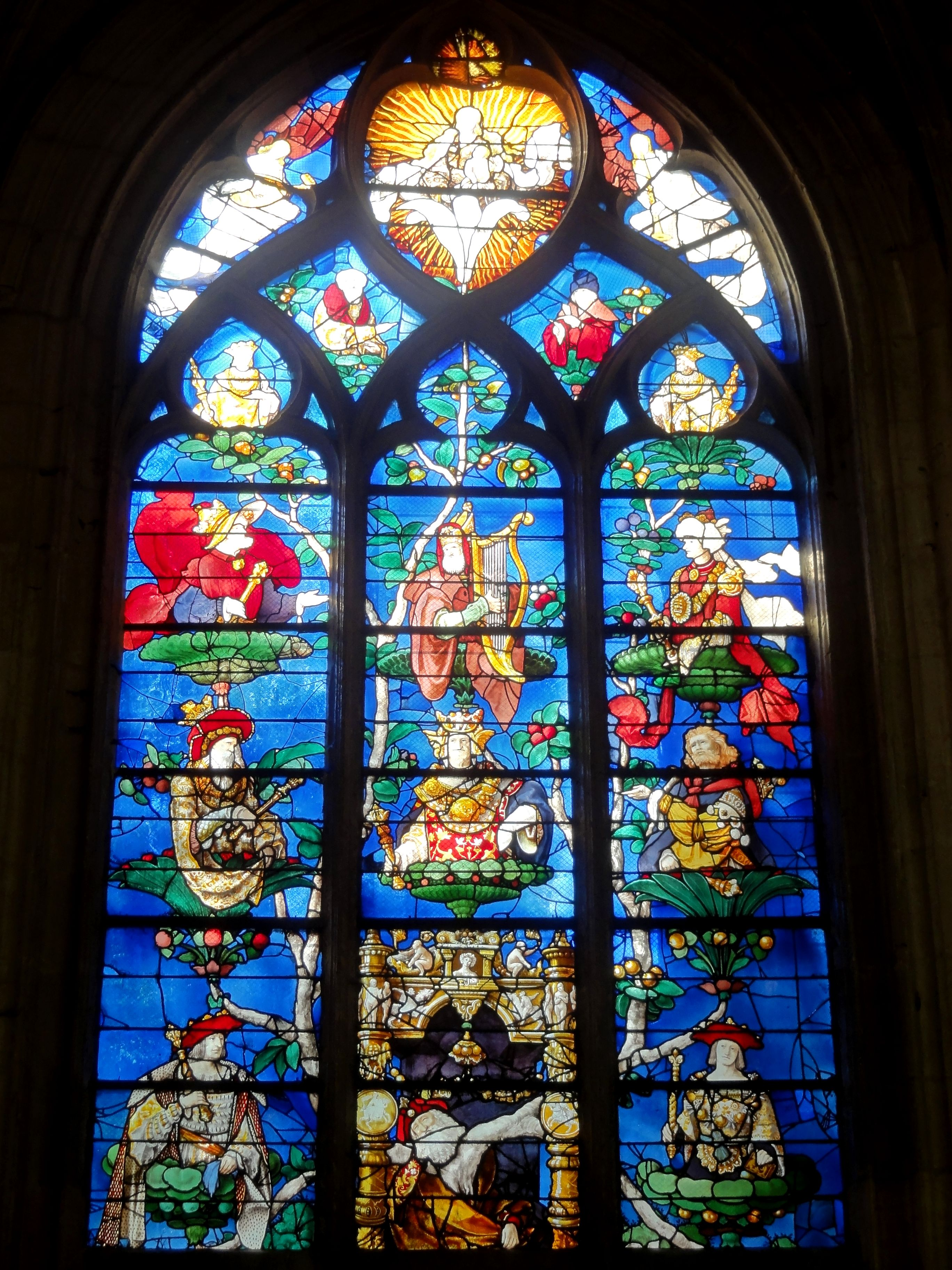
Jesse Tree at Saint-Étienne church in Beauvais, France, by Engrand Le Prince, 1522–1524

=== Medieval ===
==== Jesse Tree at Chartres Cathedral ====
Among the famous stained glass windows of Chartres Cathedral in Northern France is the Jesse Tree window, of 1140–50, the far right of three windows above the Royal Portal and beneath the western rose window. It derives from the oldest known (and almost certainly the original) complex form of the Jesse Tree, with the tree rising from a sleeping Jesse, a window placed in the Saint-Denis Basilica by Abbot Suger in about 1140, which is now heavily restored.

The Chartres window comprises eight square central panels, with seven rectangular ones on either side, separated, as is usual in 12th-century windows with no stone tracery, by heavy iron armatures. In the lowest central panel reclines the figure of Jesse, with the tree rising from his middle. In each of the seven sections it branches out into a regular pattern of scrolling branches, each bearing a bunch of leaves that take on the heraldic form of the Fleur de Lys, very common in French stained glass. Central to each panel is a figure:- David, Solomon, two more crowned figures, Mary (mother of Jesus) and, surrounded by the doves bearing the gifts of the Spirit, a majestic figure of Christ, larger than the rest. In each of the narrower panels, edged by richly patterned borders, are the figures of fourteen prophets bearing scrolls.

Apart from the theological importance the design is one of the few subjects that works very well as a unified composition for one of the tall vertical spaces of the windows of Romanesque and Gothic churches; most other tall windows were divided into separate scenes. Saint-Denis and Chartres provided a model for many other such windows, notably the Jesse Tree windows of Canterbury Cathedral, c. 1200, probably also made in France, and St. Kunibert, Cologne of 1220–35. Section references:- Brown, Lee, Seddon and Stephens.

==== York Minster, England ====
A small and much fragmented panel from a Jesse Tree window, at York Minster is thought to be the oldest surviving stained glass in England, dating from perhaps as early as 1150.

==== Canterbury Cathedral, England ====
This window, dating from c. 1200, had an unfortunate history. Having survived the Dissolution of the Monasteries, the depredations of the Puritans and the ravages of time, it was dismantled and removed, with many other original windows during the 19th and early 20th centuries, and replaced by a copy. Fortunately two surviving panels were later returned and are in place in the Corona Chapel at the eastern end of the building.

==== Wells Cathedral ====
Wells Cathedral has a rare example of an intact 14th-century Jesse Tree window which survived the iconoclasm of the 17th-century and the losses of World War II. The window is located high up in the eastern end of the choir. The colours of this window are red, yellow, green, white and brown, with very little blue. The window is wide for its height, having seven lights, and being topped by tracery. Consequently, the tendrils of the Tree spread out sideways and the central panel has only three figures: the reclining Jesse at the bottom; the Blessed Virgin holding the Christ Child in her arms and above, the crucified Christ. There are fourteen more figures in the window, identifiable in some cases by their attributes, such as David's harp and Solomon's model of the Temple of Jerusalem. As well as the tendrils, the figures are framed by typical 14th-century canopies and bases displaying the name of each person. The window is currently undergoing extensive conservation.

==== St Mary's Church, Shrewsbury ====
St Mary's Church in Shrewsbury, England contains an enormous 14th-century depiction of the Jesse Tree. By tradition, it was made for the Franciscan church in Shrewsbury, moved to St Chad's Church after the Dissolution of the Monasteries, and then to St Mary's in 1792. Although it was much restored in 1858 by David and Charles Evans, much of the original glass remains and is dated between 1327 and 1353.

Other examples are at the Sainte-Chapelle in Paris (1247), the Cathedral of Le Mans (13th century) and Evreux Cathedral in Normandy (15th century).

=== Renaissance and classical ===
Dorchester Abbey, Dorchester, Oxfordshire

The north window in the sanctuary is unique as it combines tracery and sculpture with stained glass in a single theme. It shows the ascent of Christ from Jesse. The tree with five undulating branches carved in foliage rises from the sculptured recumbent form of Jesse. Much of the 14th-century glass is fragmentary, but still in its original tracery. The figures of Christ and the Virgin and Child with other figures are intact. The glass contains figures from a Tree of Jesse and additional figures are carved on stone mullions.

St. Leonard's Church, Leverington, Cambridgeshire

A 15th-century restored Tree of Jesse window in the chapel of the east end of the church. Thirteen of the figures are original, seventeen are partly restored and thirty-one are modern. The kings are dressed in short doublets which are compared with similar figures in the manuscript of 1640 representing the victories of Edward IV which is in the British Library at Harley MS 7353.

Holy Well and St. Dyfnog's Church, Llanrhaeadr, Denbighshire, Wales.

The Tree of Jesse window was made in 1533. The window depicts Jesse asleep in a walled garden, from him springs a many branched family tree, in which can be seen the ancestor kings of christ. The figures resemble 'court' playing cards, which took their form at about the time the window was made.

Saint-Étienne church, Beauvais, France

A Renaissance three-light window by Engrand Le Prince (1522–1524), with the royal ancestors dressed in fashionable garments, rising from large flower-pods. Jesse has a four-poster bed. In the tracery, the central section has the form of a Sacred Heart and contains the Virgin and Christ Child rising from a lily and surrounded by radiant light.

Cathedral Notre-Dame, Moulins, Central France

Tree of Jesse window above Jesse can be seen a king on horseback from the 15th or 16th century.

=== 19th and early 20th century ===
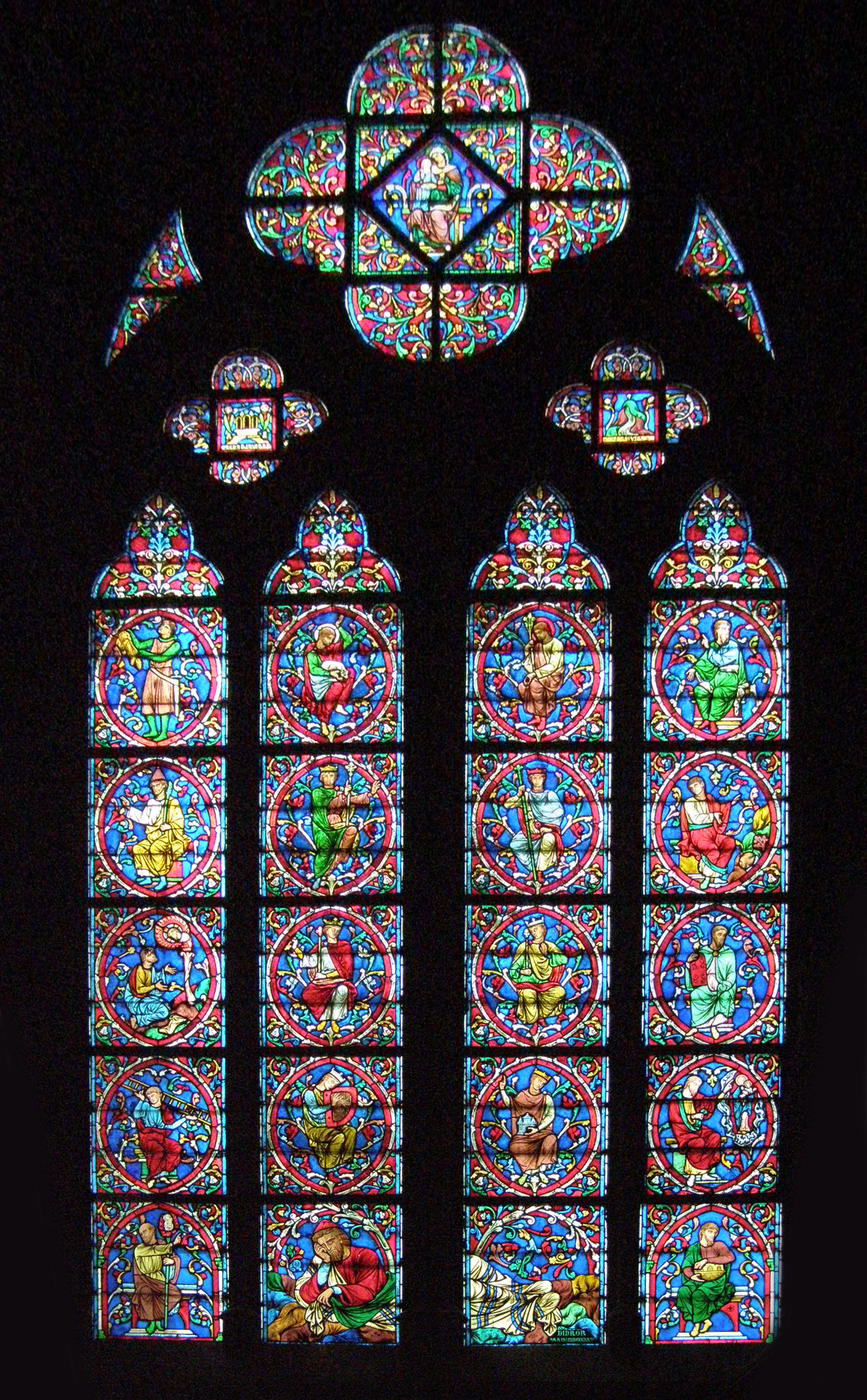
A 19th-century window from Notre-Dame de Paris

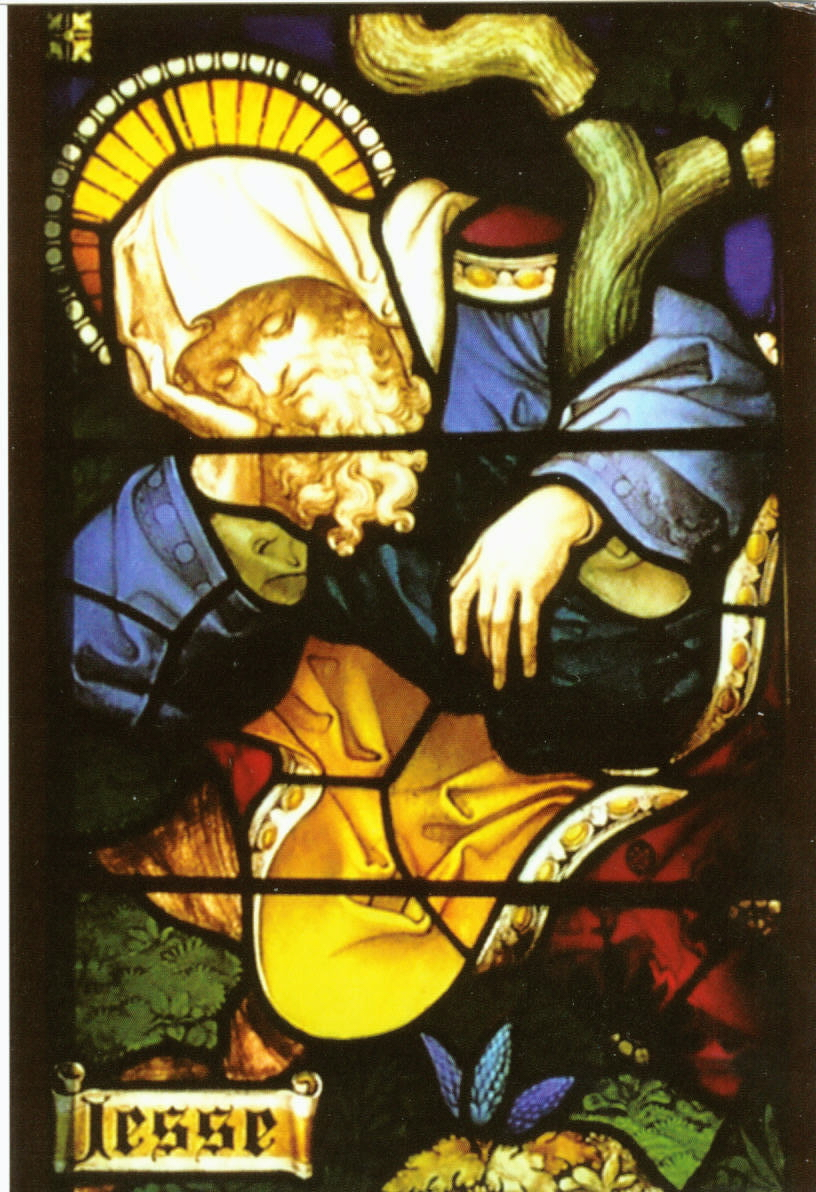
Detail of Jesse from the Stained Glass window of All Saints Church, Hove, Sussex. England

St. Bartholomew's Church, Rogate, West Sussex.

The Jesse window of 1892 by Lavers & Westlake is a colourful design. All the figures are seated in the vine except for the Virgin Mary who is seated within a flowering virga, outside the vine. Above her head are seven doves representing the seven gifts of the Holy Spirit. The figures in the window are; in the first light – Hezekiah, Solomon, Melchizedek. Middle light – Jesse, David, the Virgin and Christchild on her knee. Third light – Jehoshaphat, Asa, and Isaiah. The three light window is dedicated to the Honourable J J Carnagie born 8 July 1807 died 18 January 1892, placed in the church by Henry Allen Rolls (brother of the co-founder of Rolls-Royce Limited) in 1892.

Pusey House Chapel, Oxford, Oxfordshire.

In the east window there is a Tree of Jesse commemorating Pusey, who was one of the leaders of the 19th-century Oxford Movement in the Church of England. Pusey died in 1882 and Pusey House was established as his memorial. The window is by Sir Ninian Comper and contains figures of Old Testament prophets, and fathers of the Church, representing some of the areas of his study, surrounding Christ in Majesty and the Virgin and Child. The figure of Pusey can be seen, kneeling at the base of the second light from the right.

St. Mary of the Assumption Church, Froyle, Hampshire

The Tree of Jesse 5 light east window is by Kempe/Burlison & Grylls 1896. Nineteen figures can be seen including Jesse, King David, King Solomon, the Blessed Virgin Mary and Child.

St. Matthew's Church, Newcastle, Northumberland.

Tree of Jesse window by Kempe 1899.

St. Peter's Church, Stonegate, Wadhurst, E.Sussex

The 5 light west window is a Tree of Jesse window made by James Powell & Sons, London in 1910. Depicting 21 characters including Jesse, King David, King Solomon, The Virgin Mary and Child.

All Saints Church, Hove, East Sussex

The Tree of Jesse window at the west end of the south aisle is by Clement Bell, installed by the firm Clayton & Bell in 1924. The window embodies a profusion of rich deep colours, reds, blues, dark green, mauve and gold. It has four upright sections, surmounted by quatrefoil insets depicting the Mother & Child, flanked by Joseph and Jacob. Below, shown in kingly attire is the genealogical lineage of Joseph with some of his forebears from the house of David, Salathiel, Zorobabel, Sadoc, Matthan, Ozias, Jehoshaphat, Ezekias, Josias, Roboam, King David, Solomon and Asa. Below these are the prophet Isaiah a recumbent Jesse, and in the bottom corner Matthew recording these details in the opening of his gospel.

St. George's Church, Slough, Britwell, Berkshire.

A five light Tree of Jesse window is mentioned in the church inventory. A huge and spectacular window in 1-inch-thick (25 mm) glass, set in concrete, and made by James Powell & Sons and John Baker in 1960, it was demolished in October 2004.

St. John the Baptist Church, Claines, Worcester

This church has a fine 19th-century mosaic paving depicting the Tree of Jesse. It was designed and executed by Aston Webb.

=== Modern ===
St. James's Church, Portsmouth, Milton, Hampshire

The consecration of St. James Church took place in 1913, built on a north–south axis in Gothic form. The addition of the Tree of Jesse stained glass east window, inserted to mark the church's 21st anniversary (1954). The window by Sir Ninian Comper shows the descent of Jesus, through Mary, from King David, the youngest son of Jesse, the Bethlehemite.

St. Andrew's Church, Swavesey, Cambridgeshire

The east window in the Lady Chapel contains a 1967 Tree of Jesse by Francis Skeat. In the letters to the incumbent and the churchwardens Skeat writes:

"The window scheme of my design is intended to symbolise the descent of Our Lord from Abraham and the patriarchs as detailed in the opening chapter of St. Matthew's Gospel. It is not merely a Jesse Tree since it goes back before his time..........."

Jesse appears in the right hand light and is in a standing position facing left. The figures in the window are:- first light, Boaz; second light, Ruth and above her Jacob; middle light, Abraham and Isaac; above them, the Blessed Virgin Mary and Child; at the top, Asa; fourth light, David with Solomon above him; fifth light, Jesse.

The text at the bottom of the window reads:-

Who for us men, and for our Salvation came down from heaven, and was incarnate by the Holy Ghost of the Virgin Mary, and was made man.

Cathedral Notre-Dame, Clermont-Ferrand, France

Tree of Jesse rose window 1992; with at the centre the Virgin seated, crowned, and on her lap the Christ-child with his arms extended. Eight glass medallions surrounding contain Jesse lying in the lower medallion, other figures including David and Solomon each holding scrolls, and in the top medallion the Holy Spirit represented by a Dove.

Saint Louis Abbey, St. Louis. United States

This newly built abbey has a Jesse Tree window, a fine arts project by students who made the window over a period of 4½ years. Twenty-one panels make up the 16' × 5' Jesse Tree window, based on the 12th-century Jesse Tree from Chartres Cathedral. Inspired by the design, the students have begun creating their own stained glass window depicting the lineage of St. Louis Priory School.

Llandaff Cathedral, Cardiff, Wales

The Tree of Jesse window by Geoffrey Webb is a feature of the Lady Chapel and marks the first stage in the restoration of the cathedral following damage in the Second World War.

Virga Jesse Basilica, Hasselt

After World War II destruction of the building.

Collégiale de Romont (Fribourg), Switzerland

Series of stained glass windows by Franco-Argentinian painter Sergio de Castro on the subject The Prophets, featuring the Tree of Jesse, 1980.

== Painting ==
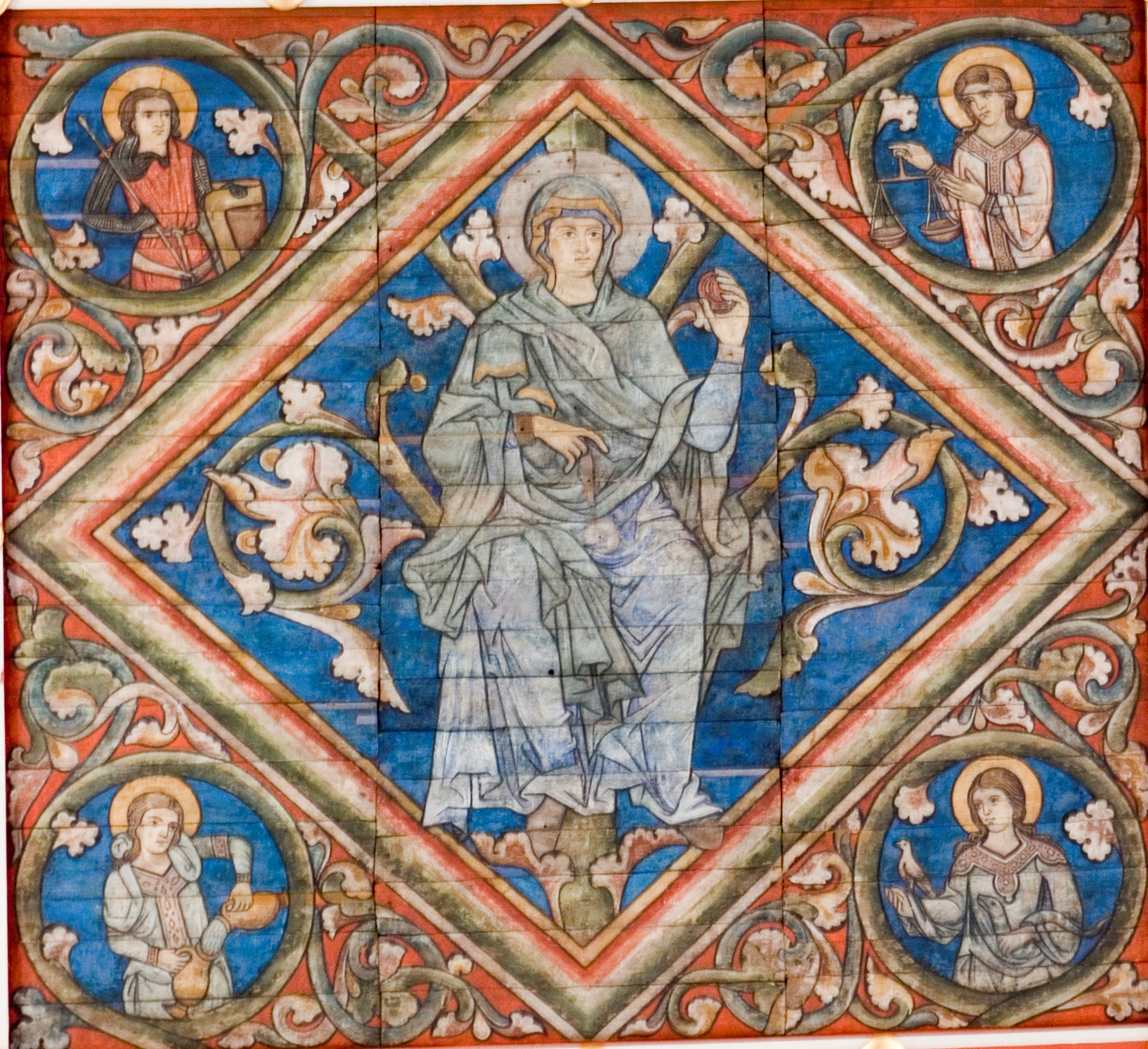
The Virgin Mary from the ceiling of St Michael's, Hildesheim

The large flat wooden ceiling in the Church of St Michael, Hildesheim of c. 1200 has the space to include a complex iconographic scheme based around the tree, which encompasses Adam and Eve, the Prophets and the Four Evangelists.(whole ceiling illustrated below) Panel paintings are rare, but a German example of c. 1470 (Darmstadt) shows a Tree on the outside of the wings of a triptych. A large Polish baroque oil by Michael Willmann (1678, Kościół Wniebowzięcia NMP, Krzeszów) shows a typically crowded Baroque apotheosis scene, with thin tendrils lacing round the figures, but not supporting them.

The nave ceiling of Ely Cathedral was painted with a scheme rather similar to Hildesheim by the gentleman artist Henry Styleman Le Strange, who began in 1858. After his death (leaving no detailed drawings for the remainder) in 1862, it was completed by another amateur artist, Thomas Gambier Parry using his special Gambier Parry process with lavender oil.

== Architectural stone-carving ==
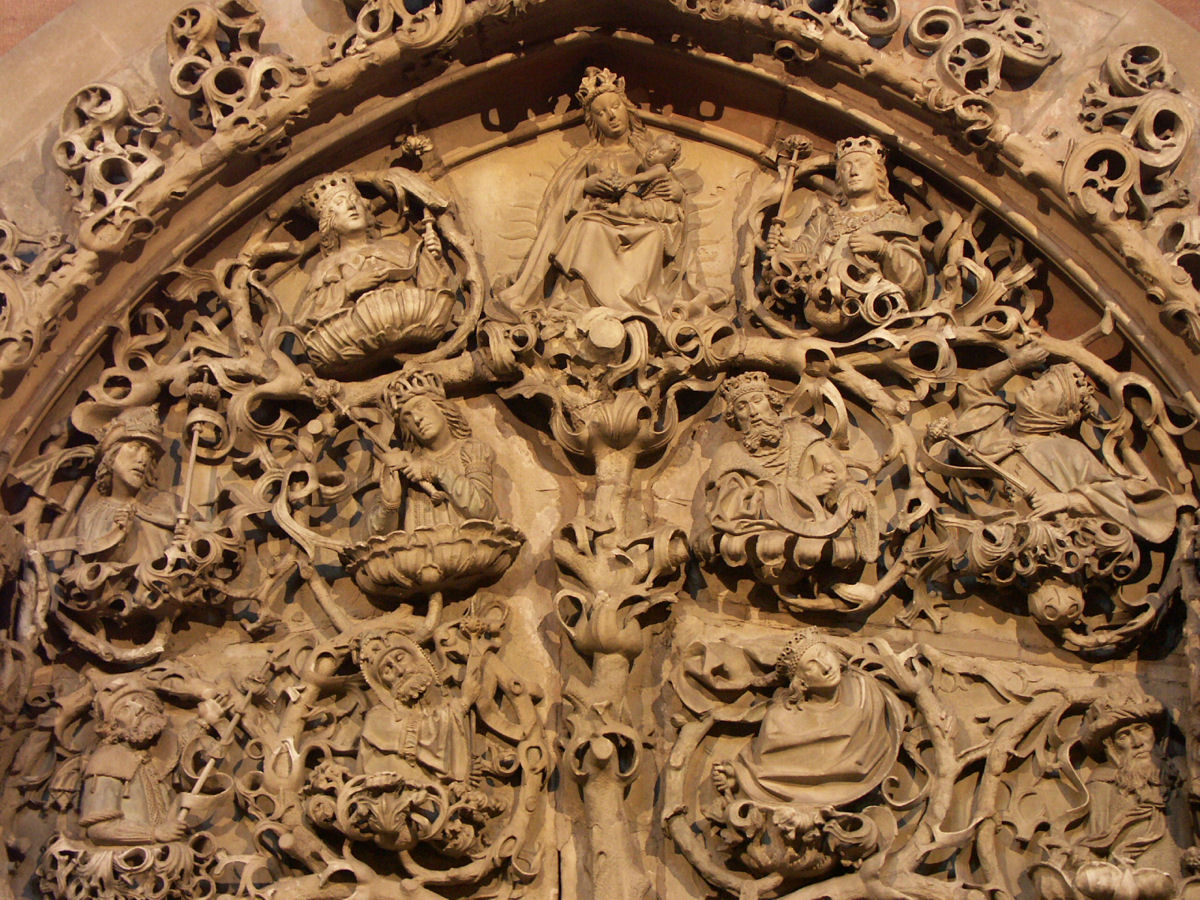
Relief of Tree of Jesse, Cathedral St. Peter, Worms, Germany

Relatively small-scale Jesse Trees feature in prominent positions in many medieval churches, most notably under a statue of St James on the central column of the famous main entrance (the Portico de la Gloria of 1168–88) of the Cathedral of Santiago de Compostela. Another masterpiece of Romanesque stone-carving, the cloister of the Monastery of Santo Domingo de Silos, has a Tree on a flat panel carved in relief. Several 13th-century French cathedrals have Trees in the arches of doorways: Notre-Dame of Laon, Amiens Cathedral, and Chartres (central arch, North portal - as well as the window). However these mostly show the ancestors in archivolts on both sides of an arch, and although they are connected by tendrils, the coherence of the image is rather lost. Another popular way of showing the ancestry of Christ was to have a row or gallery of statues of the Kings of Judah (part of the ancestral line from Jesse) on the facade, as at Notre Dame de Paris, but these too go beyond the image of the Tree. In a shorthand version, a statue of the Virgin and Child on an entrance trumeau to Freiburg Minster is supported by a Jesse sleeping on a chair (c. 1300).

Church of St Cuthbert, Wells, Somerset. St Cuthbert's Church formerly held a sculpted Tree of Jesse forming the reredos in its south transept, its components arranged around the east window. The contract survives, and shows that it was made in 1470 by John Stowell. It was destroyed during the Reformation or Interregnum, but the outline of the figure of Jesse is still visible, and many fragments of sculpture also survive.

Christchurch Priory, Dorset. Christchurch Priory contains a boldly carved reredos in high-relief of the 1350s in the form of the Tree of Jesse. The figures of Jesse, King David and another prophet all survive; and Christ is represented as part of a nativity scene.

== Wood carving ==
Priory Church of St Mary, Abergavenny, Wales. The Priory Church of St Mary, Abergavenny, formerly held a 15th-century composition, described by Thomas Churchyard in 1587 as "a most famous worke in maner of a genealogie of Kings, called the roote of Jesse". By this date it had been destroyed during the Reformation, but what survives is the larger than life-sized recumbent figure of Jesse himself, carved from a single piece of oak. It has been described by Andrew Graham-Dixon as "the most impressive wood carving to have escaped the bonfires of the Reformation in Wales"; and by Phillip Lindley as "without doubt one of the finest pieces of fifteenth-century wood sculpture remaining in England or Wales". It is unclear what form the rest of the tree originally took, but in 2016 a new stained-glass Jesse window designed by Helen Whittaker was installed in the church, incorporating the wooden Jesse at its foot.

Abbotsford House Chapel, Abbotsford, Nr Melrose, Borders, Scotland. The Chapel of Abbotsford House, built in 1855 by Sir Walter Scott's granddaughter Charlotte, houses a Flemish Gothic carved and painted wooden altar front of c. 1480, depicting the Tree of Jesse. It was purchased by her husband, James Hope-Scott.

Church of Saint Francis, Porto, Portugal. An 18th-century Tree of Jesse carved in wood in Baroque style, it is three-dimensional and has coloured and gilded figures perched among its branches. Thirteen figures with the black bearded figure of Jesse lying on the bottom. The tree culminates with a picture of the Madonna and Child and a dove above them. On either side of the tree are other figures who appear to be either singing or reading from an open book which they are holding.

== Other pictural art ==
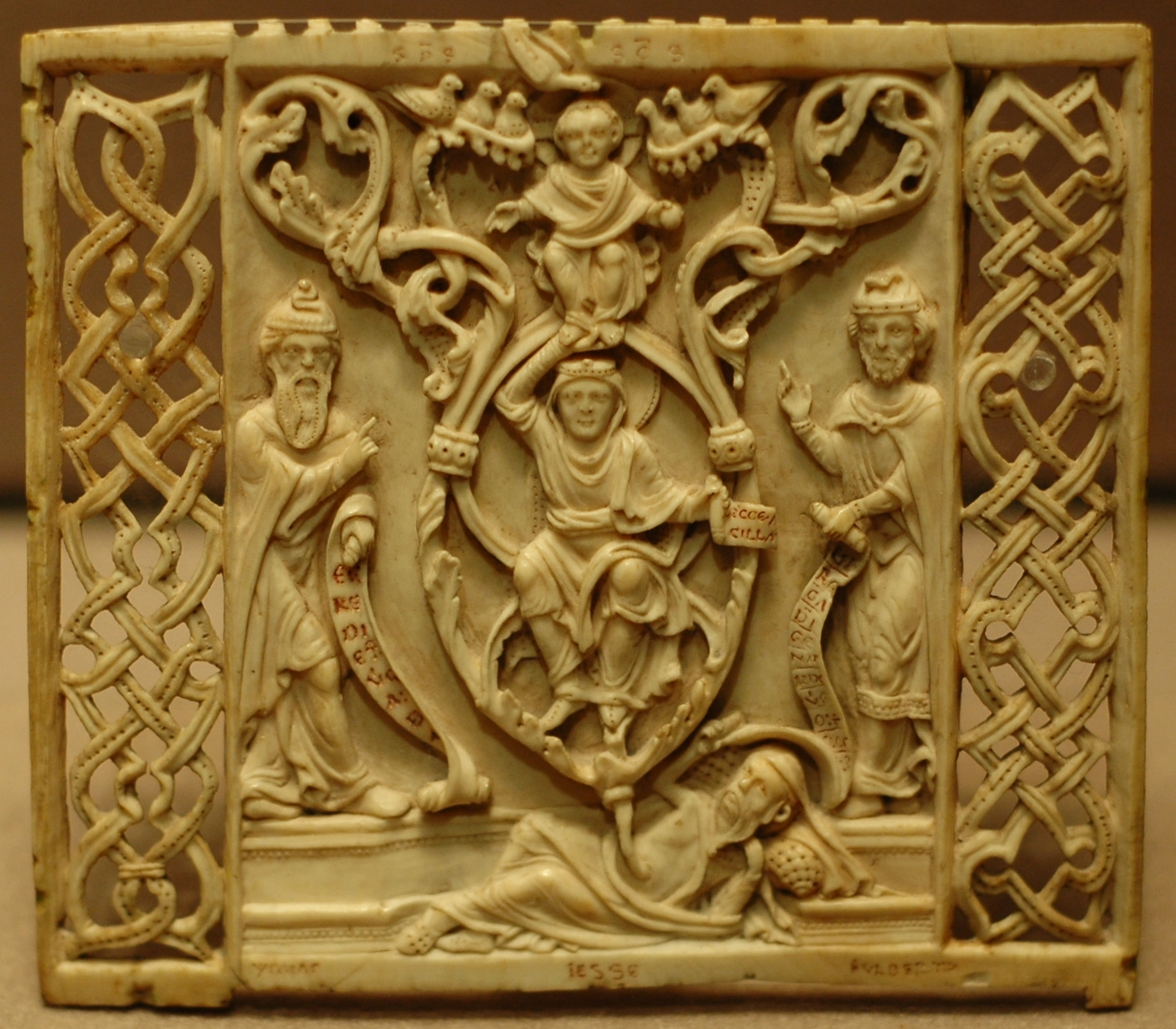
A comb from Bavaria, c. 1200

Ivory from Bavaria The rectangular back of an ivory comb (right) from Bavaria, from about 1200, is delicately carved with a Tree of Jesse scene, showing Jesse lying with the tree emerging from his navel. Two branches form a mandorla around the Blessed Virgin Mary who raises one hand to support the infant Christ, while with her other, she holds a scroll. A prophet stands to either side.

San Zeno, Verona A bronze west door from the Basilica of St Zeno in Verona has a Tree in relief of about 1138 on a single panel, with Jesse, Christ and four ancestors.

St Mark's Basilica, Venice A large mosaic Tree was put on the north wall of the north transept in the 1540s, by the Bianchini brothers as mosaicists, following a design by Salviati.

Monstrance from Augsburg A late 17th-century monstrance from Augsburg incorporates a version of the traditional design, with Jesse asleep on the base, the tree as the stem, and Christ and twelve ancestors arranged around the holder for the host.

Cathedral Notre-Dame, Antwerp, Belgium. An embroidered cope depicting the Tree of Jesse.

Abbey Church, Buckfast Abbey, Devon

The church was rebuilt on medieval foundations between 1905 and 1937. The marble floor of the Lady chapel depicts the Tree of Jesse made in the Abbey's own workshops in Byzantine style mosaic.

The Church of the Nativity, Bethlehem, Palestinian Territories A large bas-relief of the Tree of Jesse by religious sculptor Czesław Dźwigaj was incorporated into the Church of St. Catherine within the Church of the Nativity in Bethlehem in 2009, as the gift of Pope Benedict XVI during his trip to the Holy Land. Measuring 3.25 metres wide by 4 metres high, its focus is an olive tree representing the Tree of Jesse, which displays Christ's lineage from Abraham to Saint Joseph and other biblical motifs. Situated in the passage used by pilgrims making their way to the Grotto of the Nativity, the bas-relief also incorporates symbolism from the Old Testament. The upper portion is dominated by a crowned figure of Christ the King posed with open arms blessing the Earth.

== Poetry and music ==
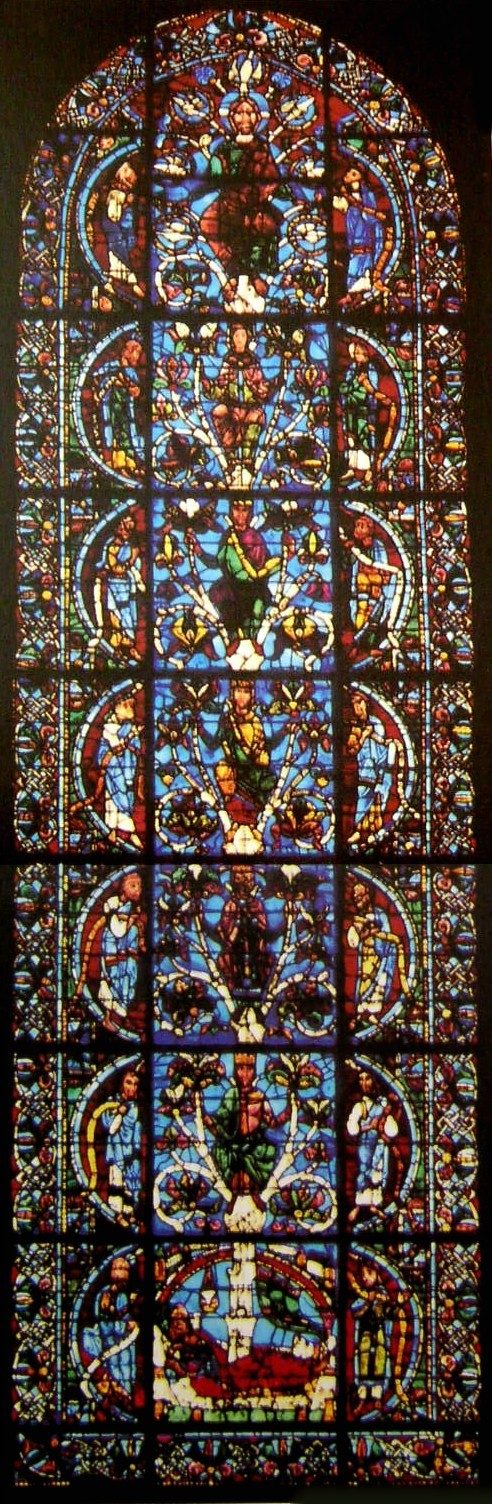
The oldest complete Jesse Tree window is in Chartres Cathedral, 1145.

The symbolic device of the Tree of Jesse has featured in Christian hymns since at least the 8th century, when Cosmas the Melodist wrote a hymn about the Virgin Mary flowering from the Root of Jesse, Ραβδος εκ της ριζης (translated in 1862 by John Mason Neale as "Rod of the Root of Jesse").

Virga Jesse floruit, an expression referring to the Virgin Mary and the birth of Christ, put to music, e.g.,

- As a Gradual:
  (Alleluja, alleluja.)
  Virga Jesse floruit:
  Virgo Deum et hominem genuit:
  pacem Deus reddidit,
  in se reconcilians ima summis.
  Alleluja.
  - William Byrd, included in his first book of Gradualia.
  - Virga Jesse by Anton Bruckner
- As part of a longer Christmas hymn, the text of which is given by Vopelius and Spitta:
  Virga Jesse floruit
  Emanuel noster apparuit
  Induit carnem hominis
  Fit puer delectabilis.
  Alleluja
  - used in a Christmas cantata by Johann Kuhnau
  - included in Magnificat in E-flat major, BWV 243a by Johann Sebastian Bach

In addition, the Tree of Jesse is also referenced in the medieval series of lyrical poems known as the Cantigas de Santa Maria, written during the reign of Alfonso X in the thirteenth century. Cantiga 20, "Virga de Jesse" makes use of the Tree of Jesse in the refrain of the song, further demonstrating its influence on medieval culture and thought:

Virga de Jésse
quen te soubésse
loar como mereces
e sen ouvésse per
que dissésse quanto
por nós padeces.

The symbol of the Virgin Mary as a rose flowering from the Tree of Jesse forms the central image of the 15th-century German hymn, Es ist ein Ros entsprungen, commonly sung to a melody by Michael Praetorius. Various translations exist of this popular hymn, including Theodore Baker's "Lo, How a Rose E'er Blooming"(1894) and "A Spotless Rose" by Catherine Winkworth. Popular musical settings include works by Johannes Brahms and Herbert Howells.

== Modern use ==
The Chrismon tree and the Advent calendar have been used by Christians, who may use the term "Jesse Tree" to refer to these, although the tree does not usually show Jesse or the Ancestors of Christ, and so may have little or no relation to the traditional Tree of Jesse. This form is a poster or a real tree in the church or home, which over the course of Advent is decorated with symbols (Chrismons) to represent stories leading up to the Christmas story, for the benefit of children. The symbols are simple, for example a burning bush for Moses and a ram for Isaac.

== Image gallery ==
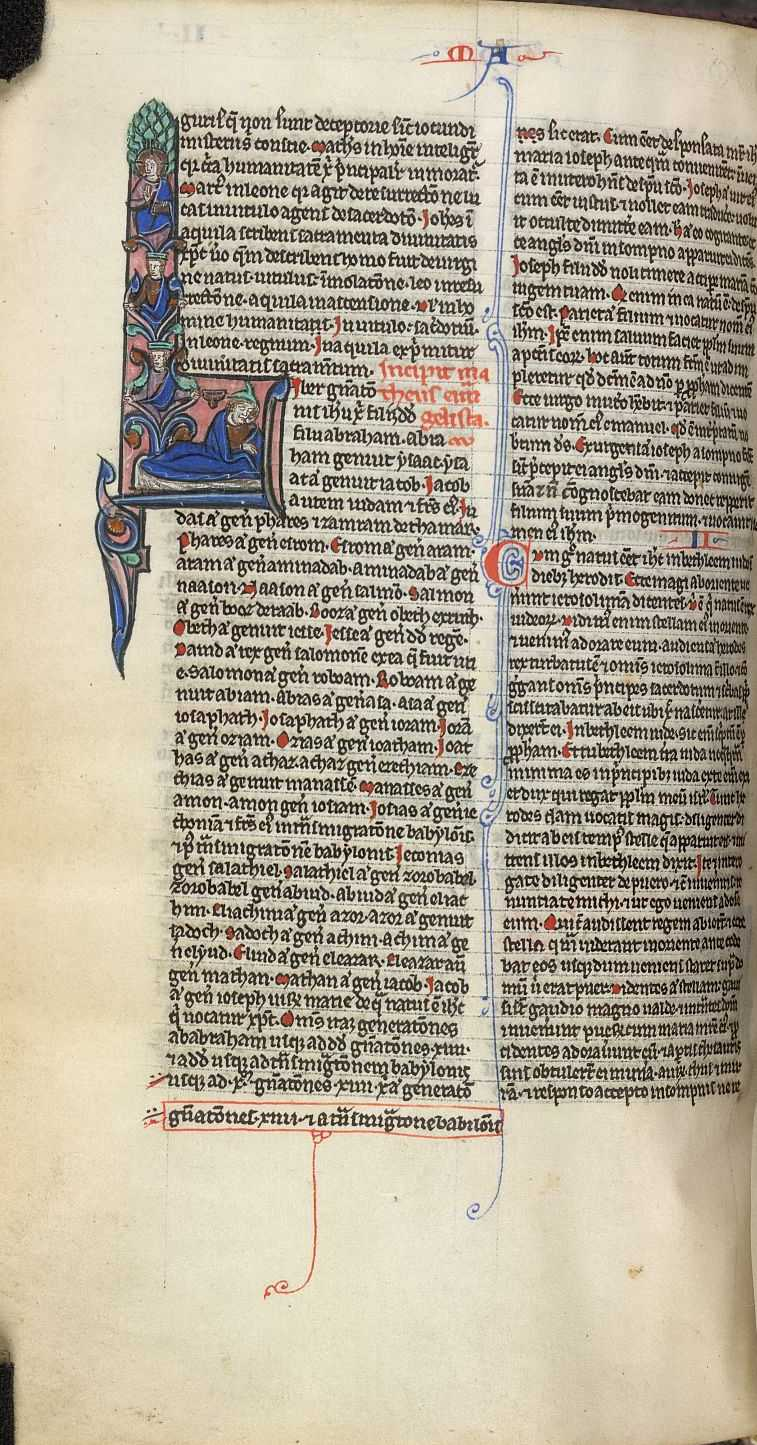
The beginning of the Gospel of Matthew from the Fécamp Bible shows the initial letter decorated with a Jesse Tree

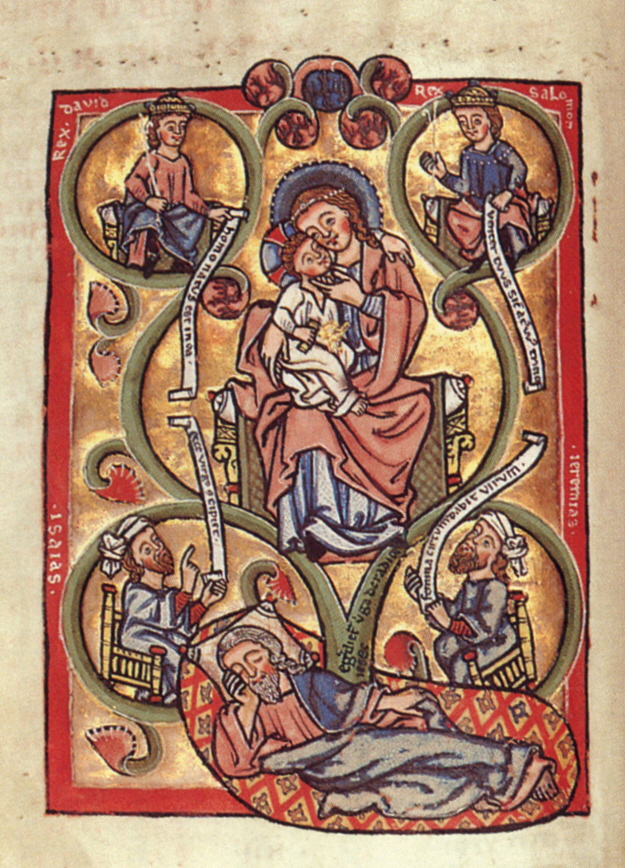
Scherenberg Psalter, c. 1260. Mary and Child, David and Solomon above, Isaiah and Jeremiah below. Note the doves in the medallions.

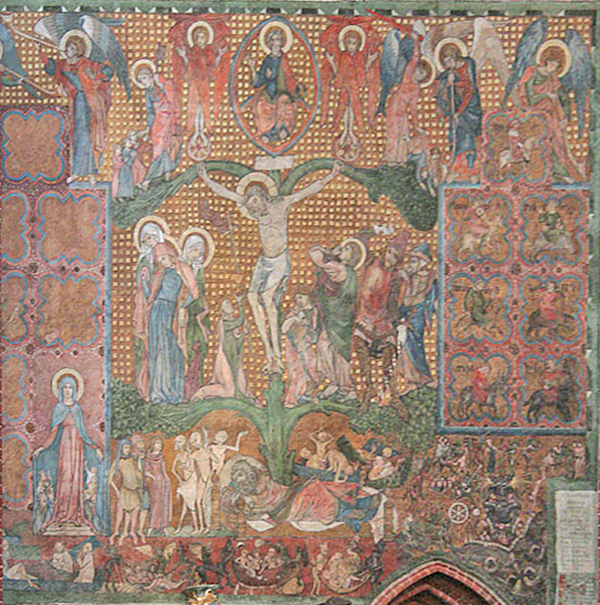
Wall painting c. 1380–90 from Toruń in Poland. Unusually, a Crucifixion occupies the middle of the Tree, with Christ in Glory above.

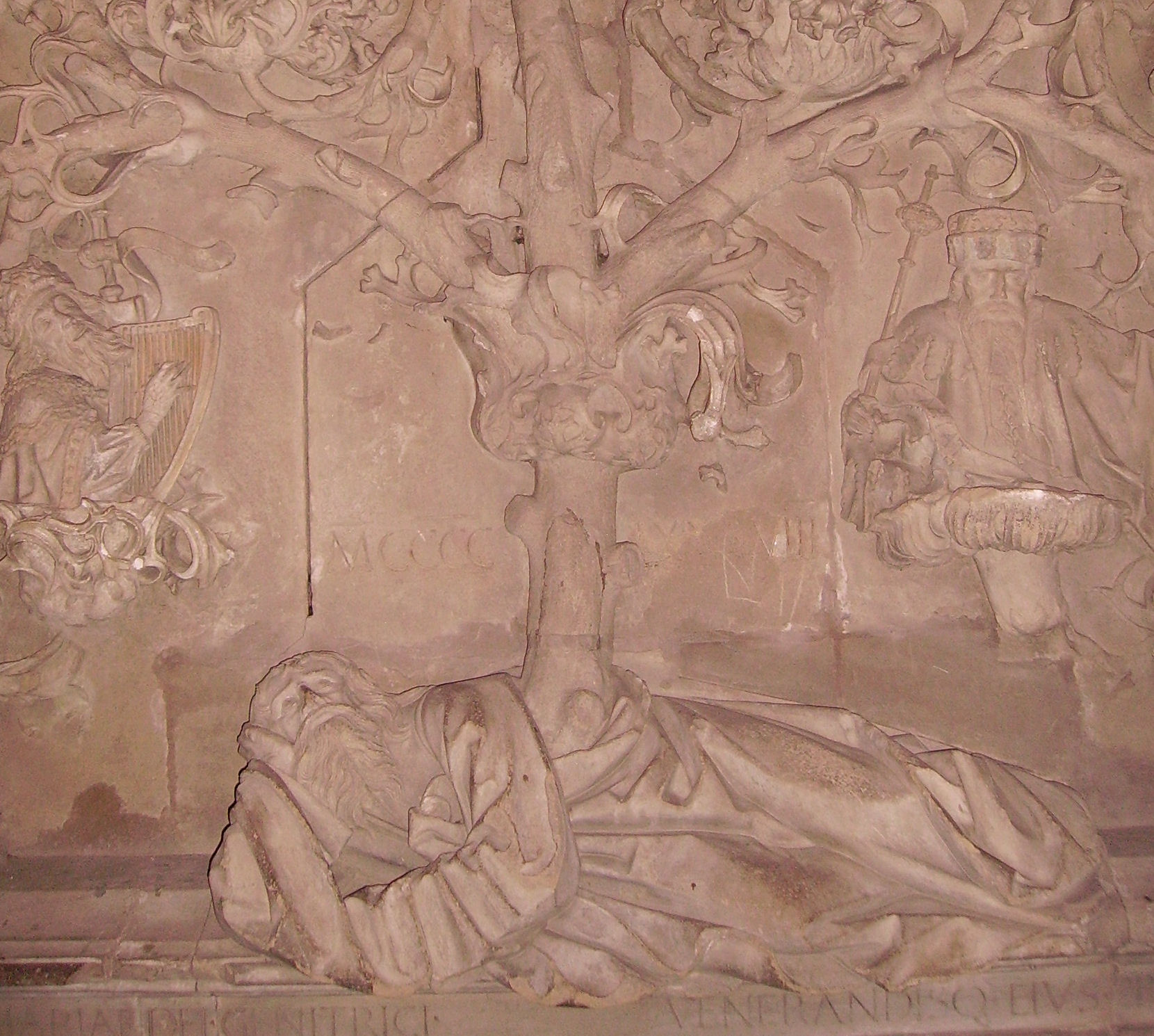
The bottom of a large stone relief from Worms Cathedral, end of the 15th century, previously in the demolished cloister.

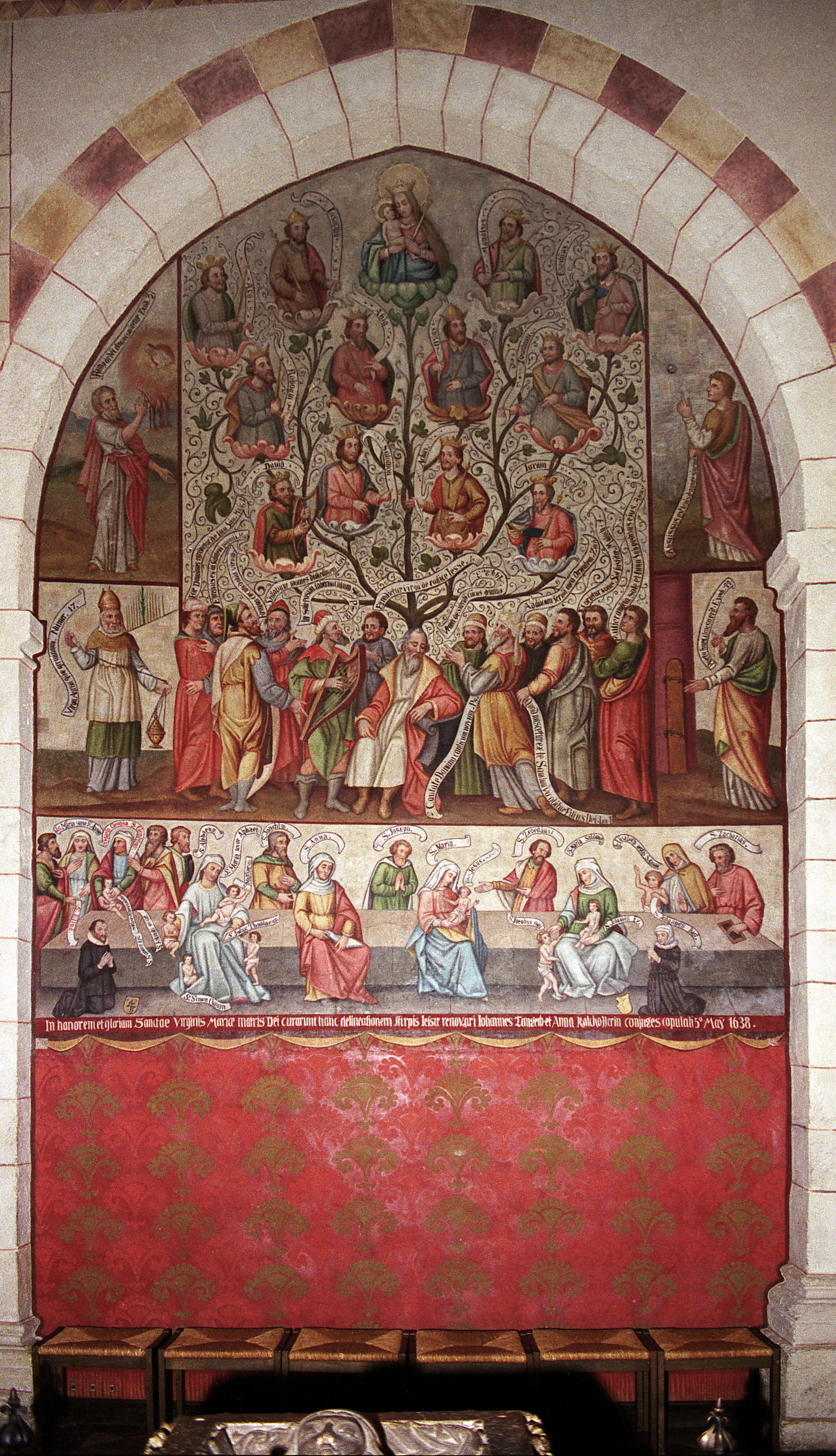
16th (?)-century painting from the Cathedral at Limburg

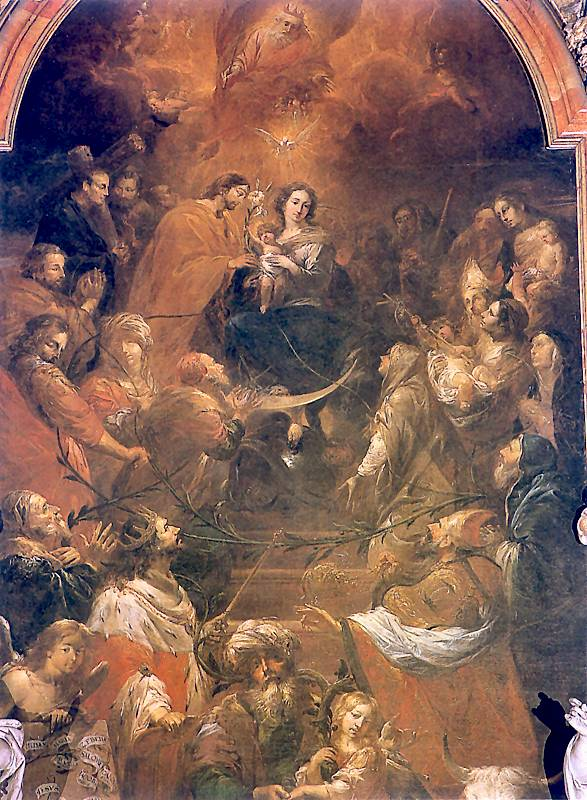
Michael Willmann 1678, Polish, oil on canvas, "Family tree of Christ", Church Of The Assumption Of The Blessed Virgin Mary, Krzeszów.

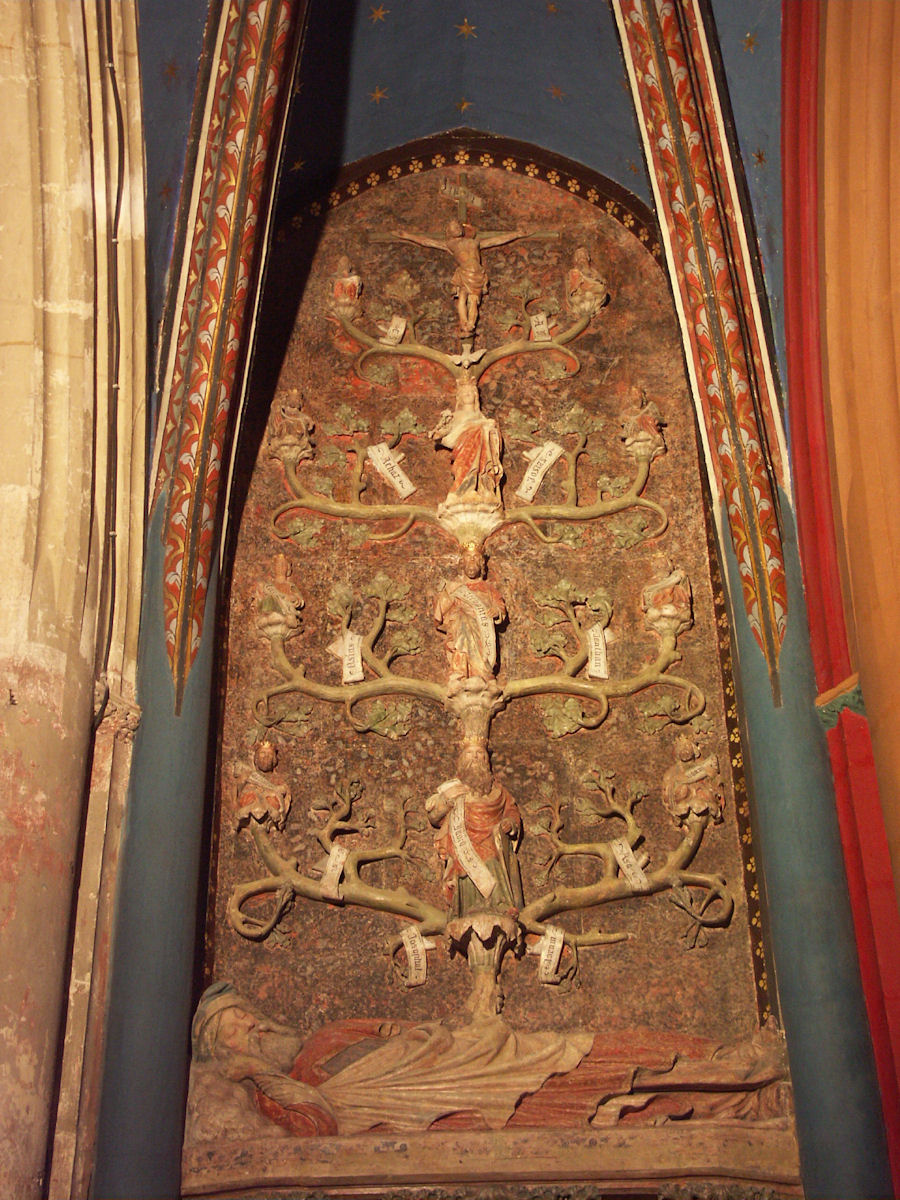
Basilique Saint-Quentin, France

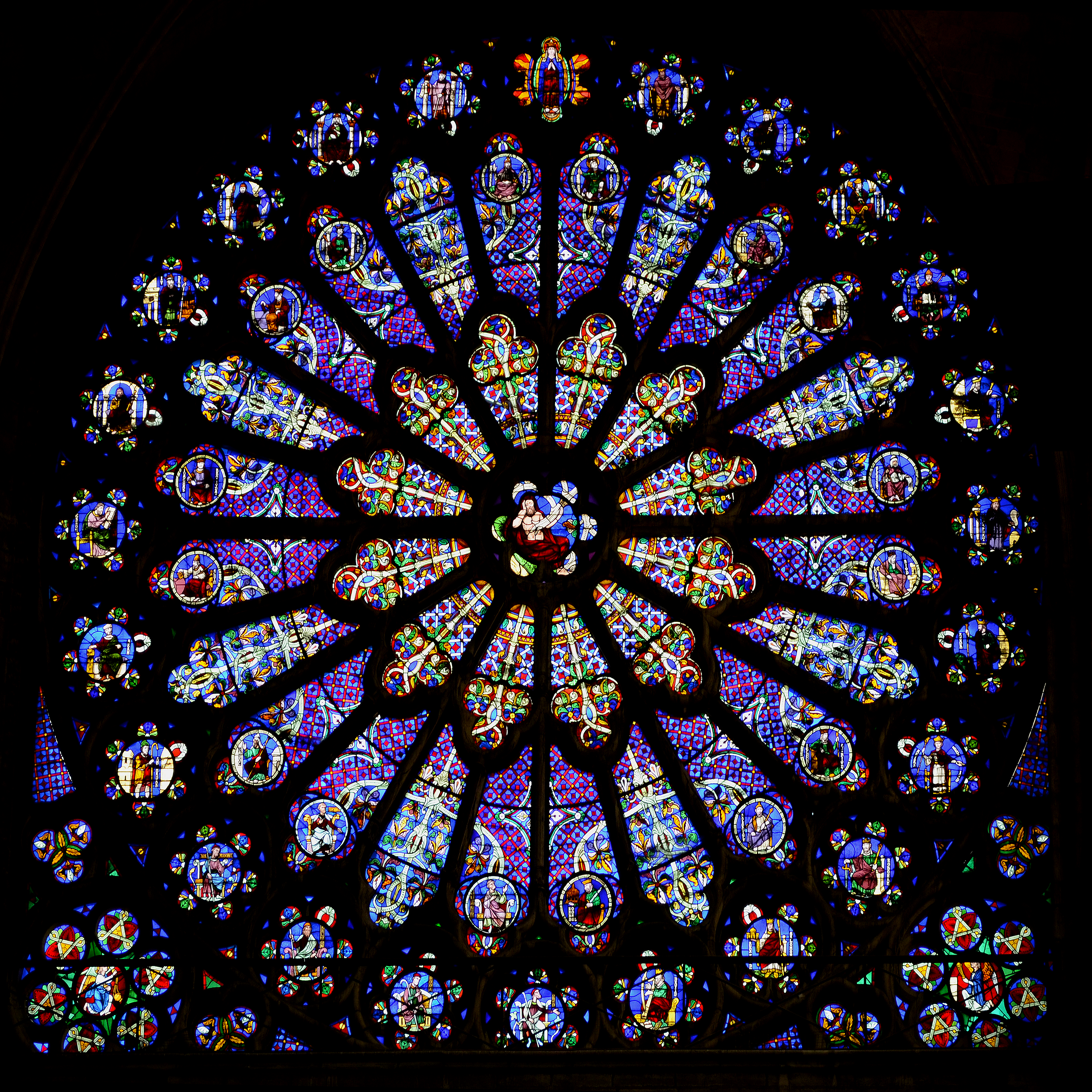
Rose window from the Basilica of St Denis, Paris, showing Jesse at the centre. This is not the earliest St Denis Jesse window, which is vertical like Chartres.

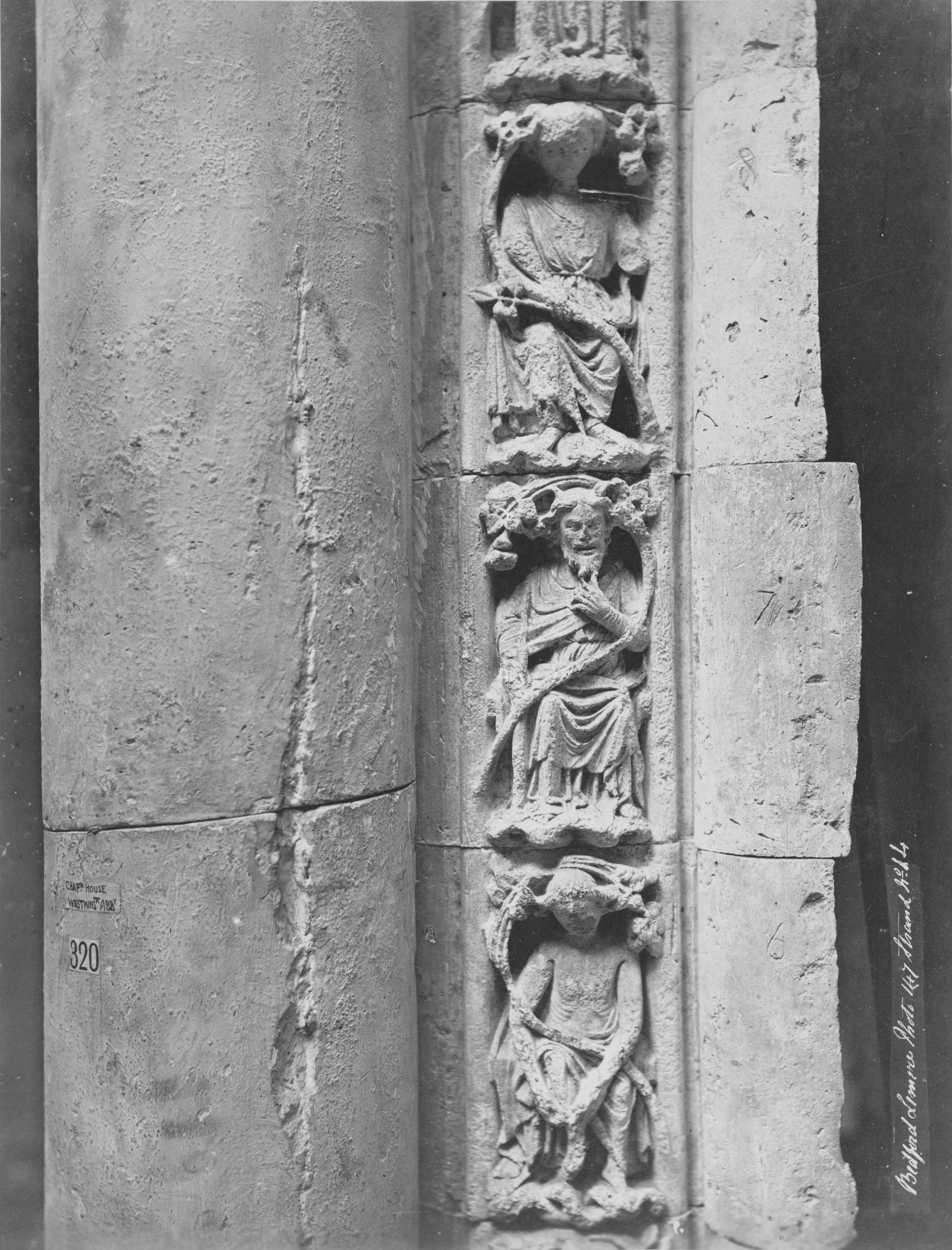
Plaster cast of the "Root of Jesse", originally from Westminster Abbey, Royal Architectural Museum, UK. Albumen print, c. 1874

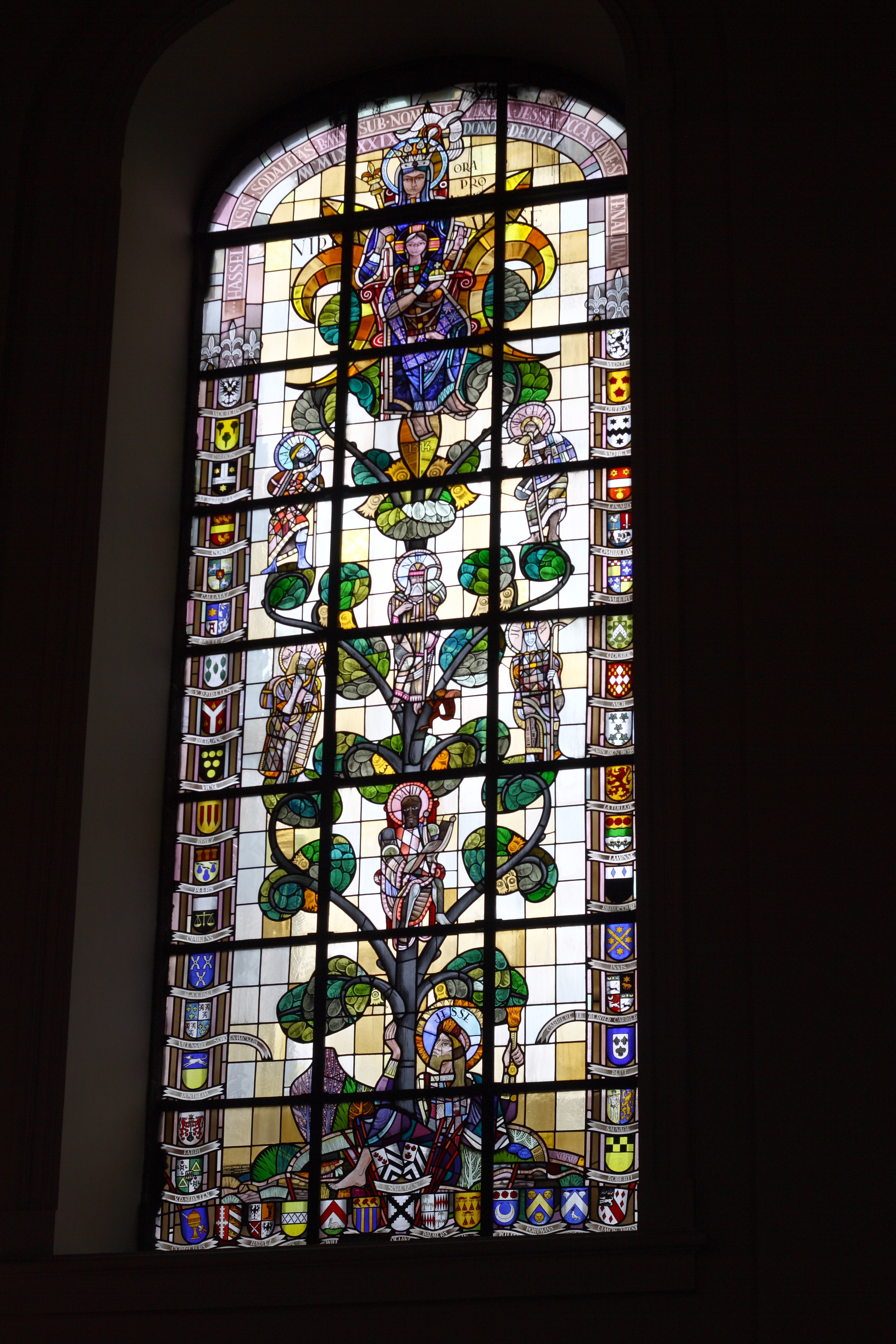
Tree of Jesse on stained glass windows of Virga Jesse Basilica, Hasselt (Belgium)

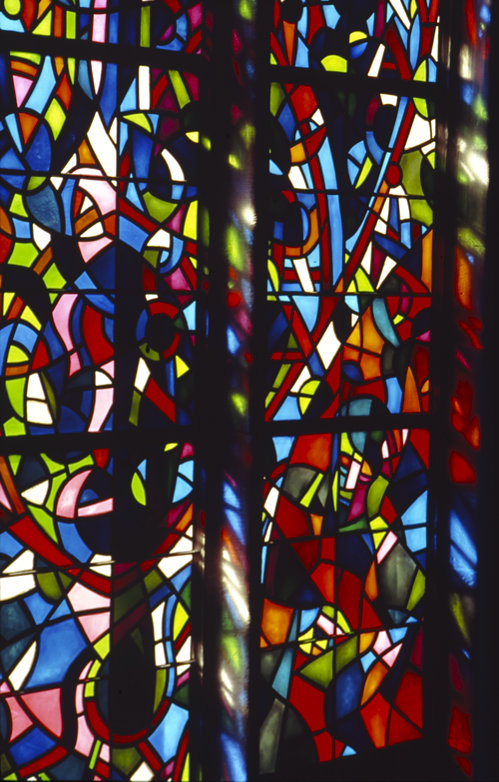
Tree of Jesse on stained glass windows by Sergio de Castro for the Collégiale de Romont (Switzerland), 1980.

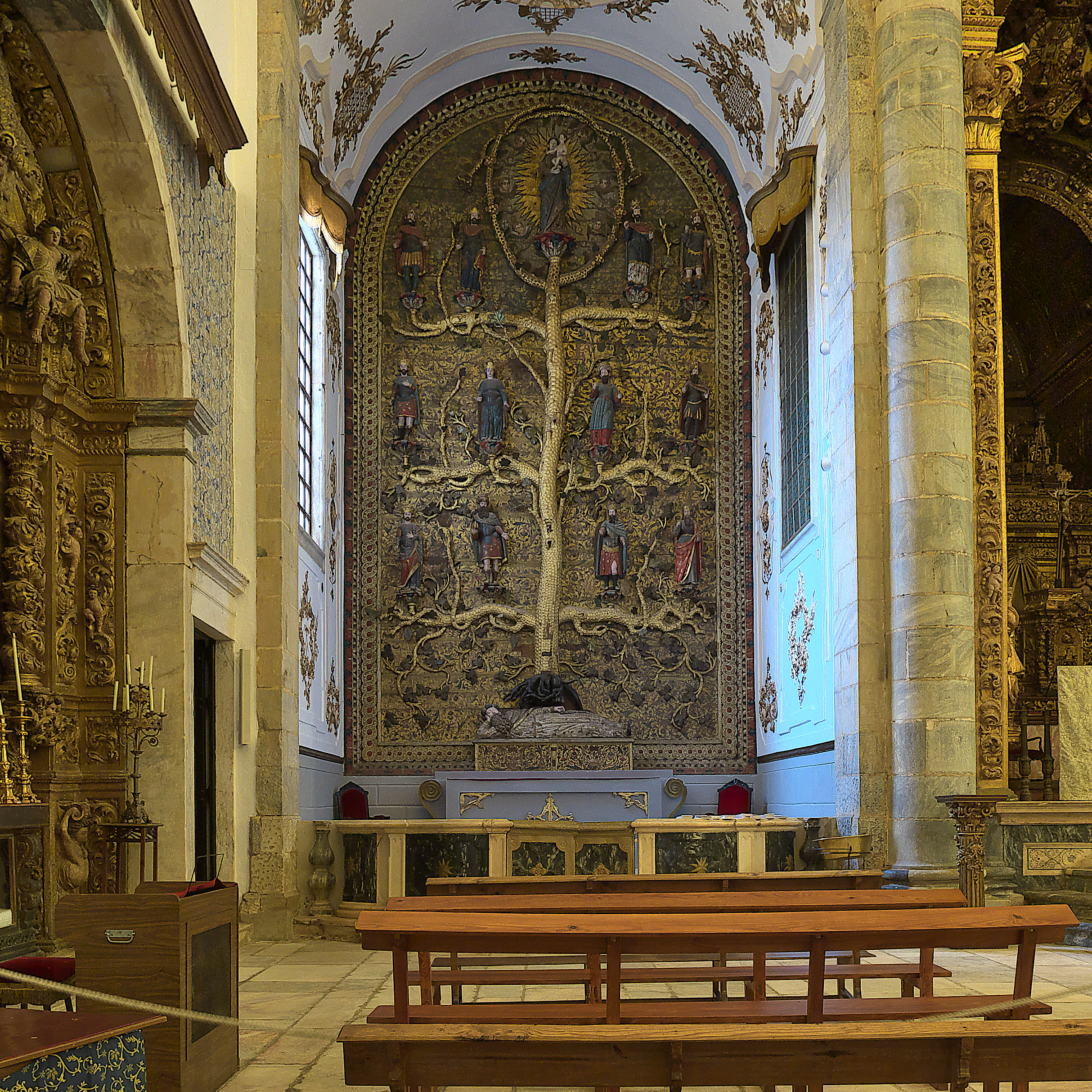
Holy church Maria of the Castle, Olivenza (Spain)

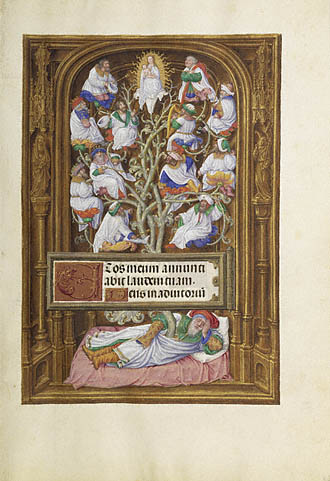
The Jesse Tree from the Spinola Hours. Master of James IV of Scotland Flemish, Bruges and Ghent or Mechelen, 1510-1520

== See also ==
- Genealogy of Jesus
- Medieval art
- Poor Man's Bible
- Stained glass
- British and Irish stained glass (1811–1918)
