= Douai Psalter =

The Douai Psalter is an East Anglian illuminated manuscript, severely damaged during World War I. The psalter, or Book of Psalms, was produced in the 1330s. The artwork was produced by the same scribe who illuminated the Macclesfield and Gorleston Psalters. Like the Gorleston Psalter, the Douai Psalter was associated with the church of St Andrew at Gorleston, near Yarmouth.

The psalter was considered "the finest complete example of the mature Italianate style in English illumination". In 1914, with German troops approaching, the psalter was buried inside a zinc box by the librarian of the Bibliothèque municipale de Douai. Upon being unearthed it was found to have been largely destroyed by acidity and water; only a few fragments and some black and white photographs survive.
