= Stowe Psalter =

11th-century religious text

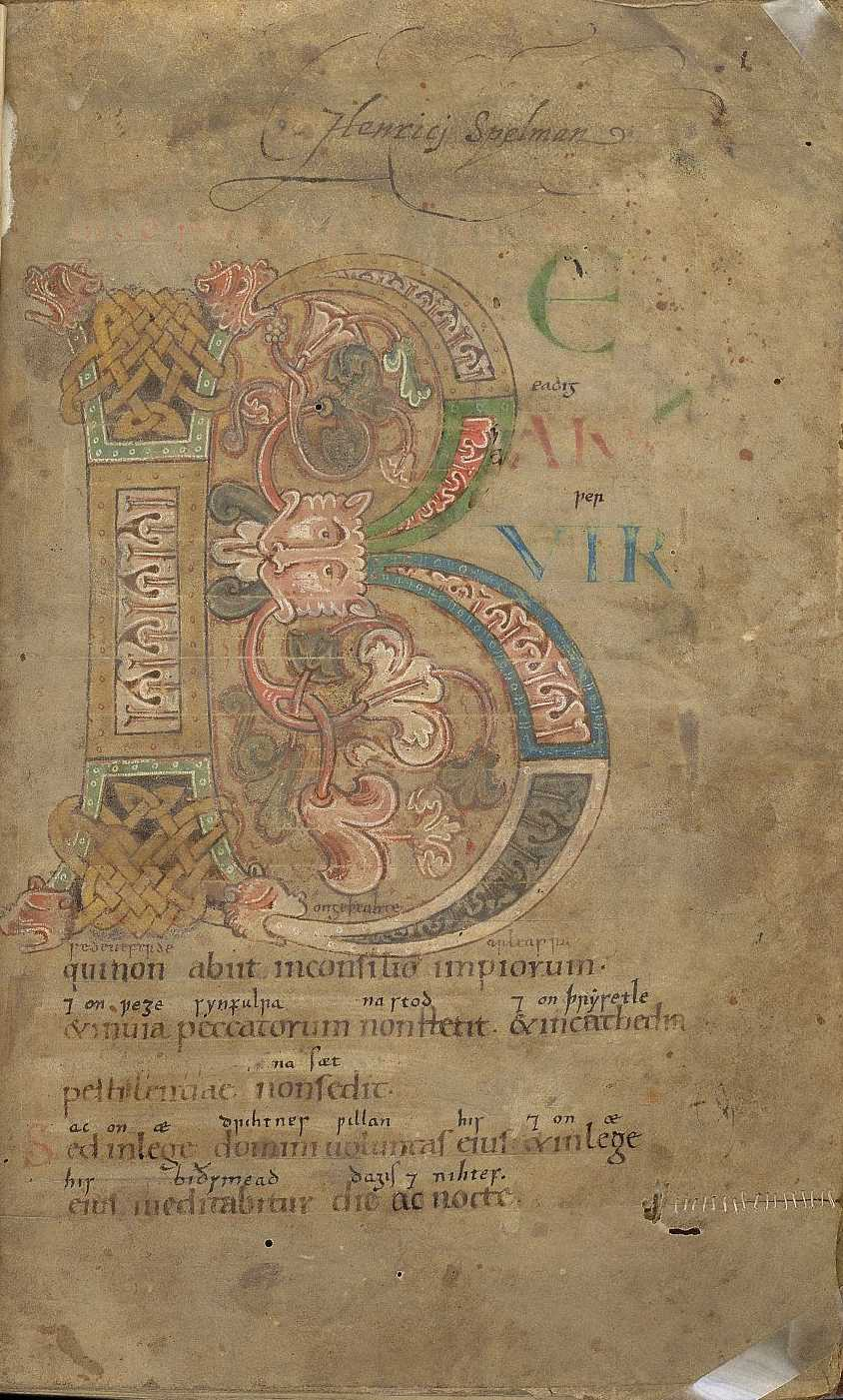
Beatus initial, Folio 1 recto of British Library, MS Stowe 2.

The Stowe Psalter (British Library Stowe MS 2, also known as Spelman Psalter or King Alfred's Psalter) is a psalter from the "2nd or 3rd quarter of the 11th century", at the end of Anglo-Saxon art. The text includes the Gallican version of the Psalms, followed by the Canticles with an interlinear Old English gloss.

== Description ==
This Psalter is closely related to the Tiberius Psalter (British Library Cotton MS. Tiberius C.VI). Both Psalters have identical prayers added to the end of each psalm. The Psalters also each have large initial "B"s, Beatus initials, at the beginning of Psalm 1 which closely resemble each other in form. The Anglo-Saxon glosses appear to have been written at the same time as the Latin text.

There are 180 extant vellum folios. The folios are 220 by 180 mm, with the text being written in an area of 225 by 120 mm. In its current binding there are two vellum flyleaves that are not counted in the foliation of the manuscript. Two folios at the end of the Canticles have been cut away. The manuscript was re-bound in tooled leather during the 17th century.

The text is written in English half-uncials, while the titles of the Psalms are written in rustic capitals. The large decorated Beatus initial at the beginning of Psalm 1 (folio 1r), and smaller decorated initials at the beginning of Psalm 51 (folio 56r) and Psalm 101 (folio 111v), are the only major decorations in the manuscript, a common pattern in psalters. Other divisions in the text are marked by smaller colored initials. There are occasional marginal ritual directions and antiphons added in a 15th-century hand. There are also a few added marginal decorations.

The manuscript was probably created at the abbey of New Minster, in Winchester. There are three other manuscripts from New Minster that were written by the scribe of this manuscript. The manuscript is signed on folio 9 recto "Kateryn Rudston" in a 16th-century hand. It belonged to Sir Henry Spelman, who signed it on folios 1 recto and 180 verso. An edition of the text was published by Spelman's son.

It was sold by Walter Clavell in 1742. The manuscript was later owned by Thomas Astle, who called it King Alfred's Psalter. Astle included a facsimile of folio 1 verso in his Origin and Progress of Writing. It was owned by the Richard Temple-Nugent-Brydges-Chandos-Grenville, 1st Duke of Buckingham and Chandos and kept at Stowe House. It contains his press mark inside the front cover. In 1849 it was sold by his son, along with the rest of the manuscripts from Stowe House to Bertram Ashburnham, 4th Earl of Ashburnham. In 1883, the British Museum purchased this manuscript, along with 1084 other manuscripts from the Stowe collection, from the 5th Earl of Ashburnham.

== Gallery ==
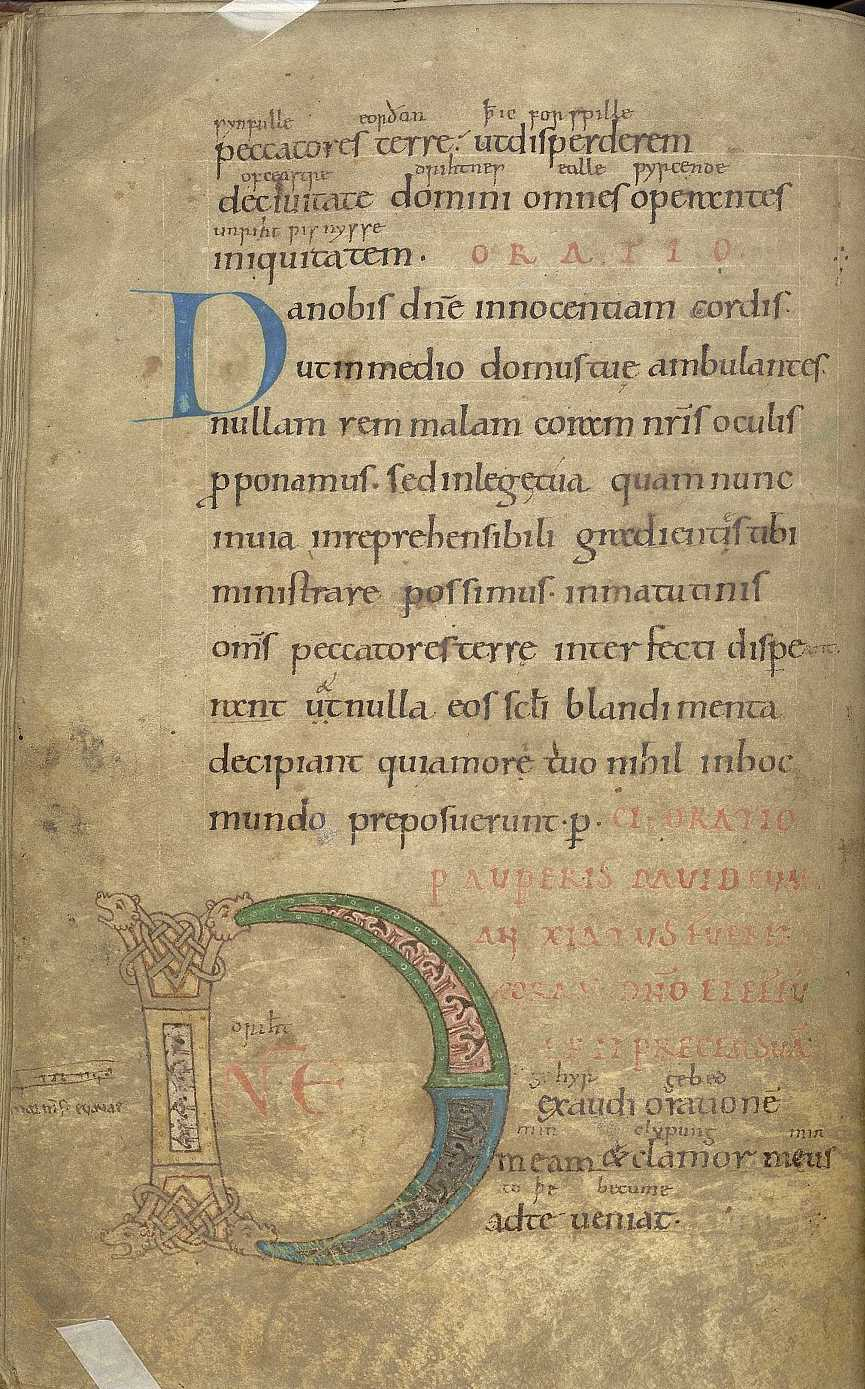
"D" at Psalm 101

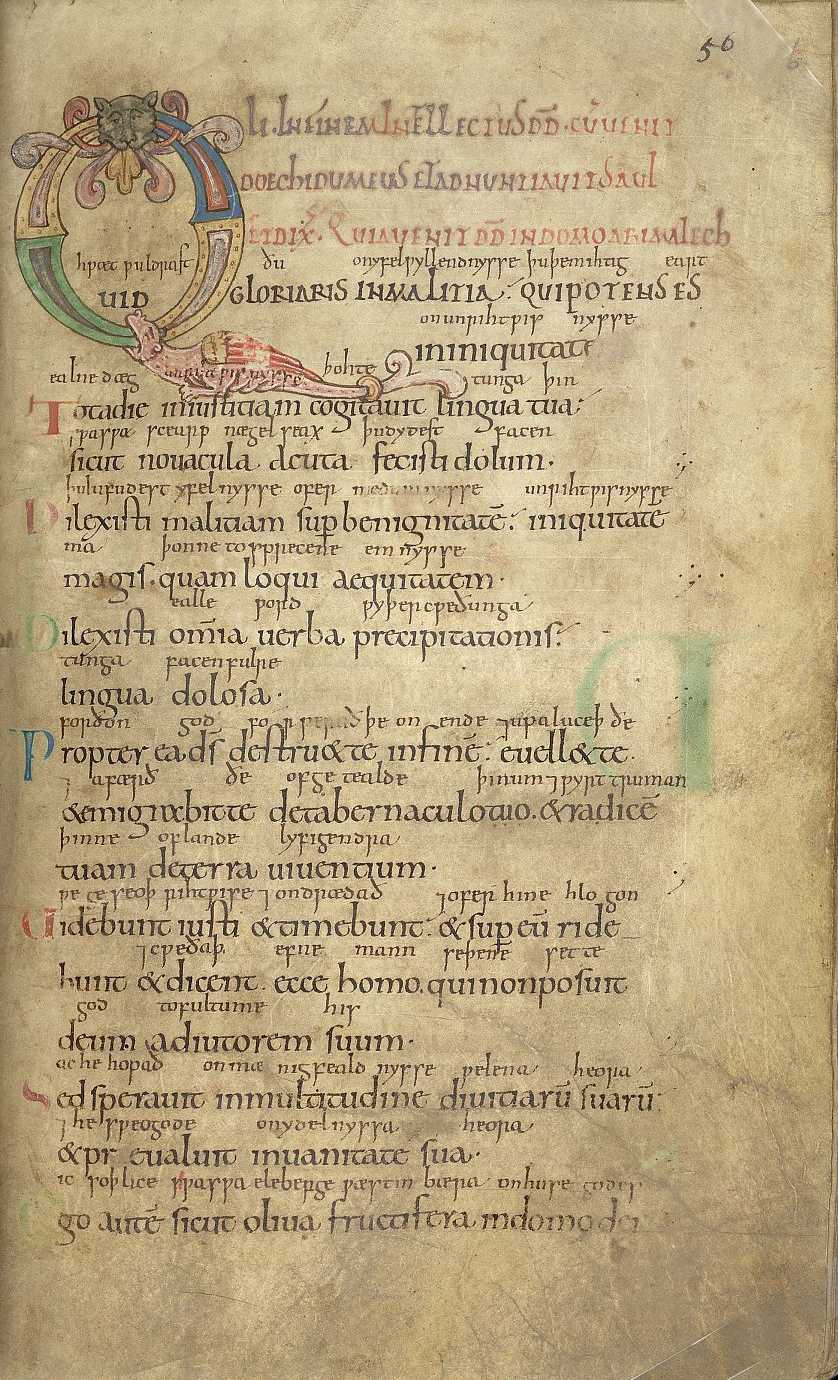
"Q" at Psalm 51

== See also ==
- St. Albans Psalter
- Tiberius Psalter
