= Tiberius Psalter =

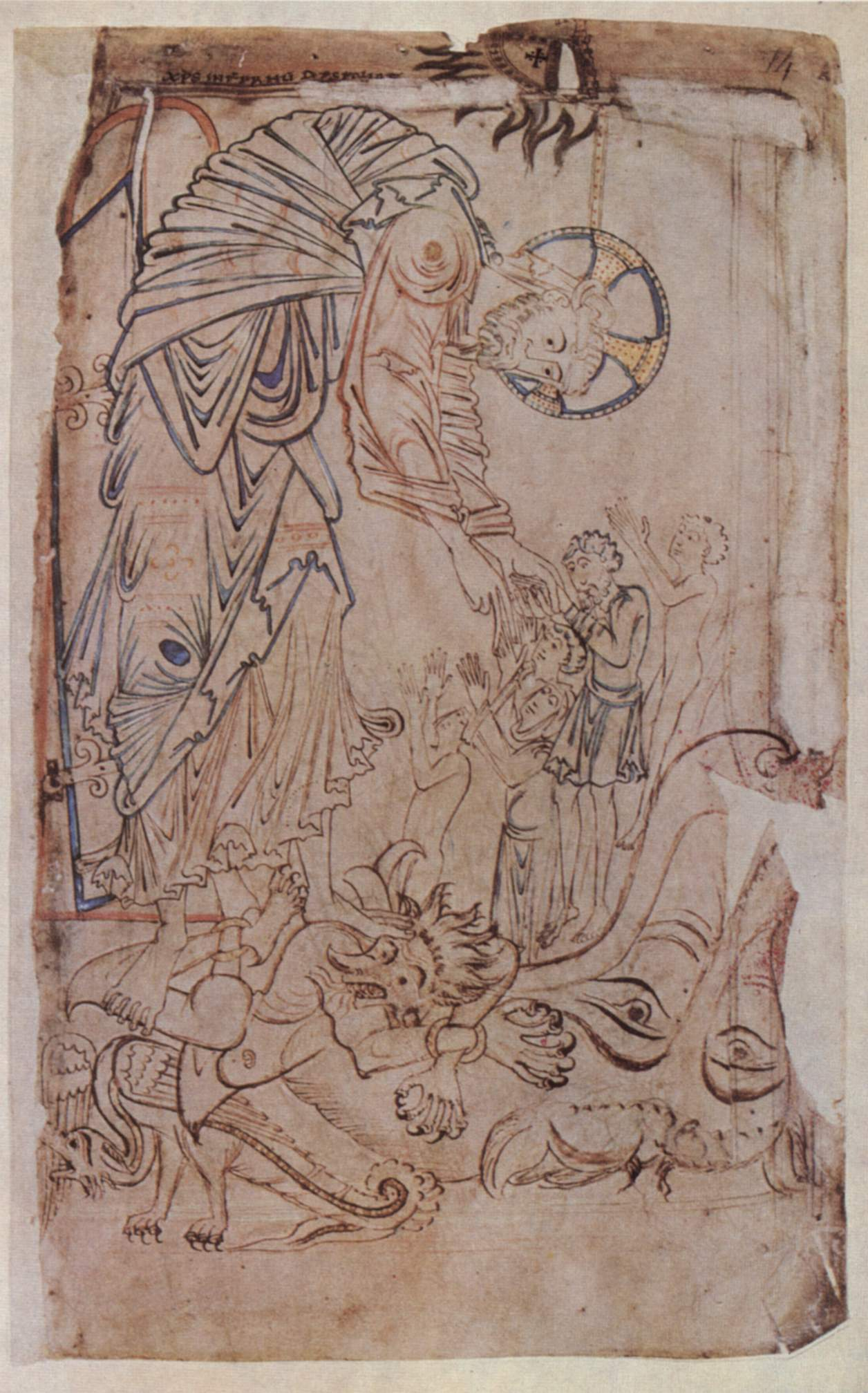
The Harrowing of Hell in the Tiberius Psalter

The Tiberius Psalter (British Library Cotton MS. Tiberius C.vi) is one of at least four surviving Gallican psalters produced at New Minster, Winchester in the years around the Norman conquest of England (the other three being the Stowe Psalter, Vitellius Psalter and Lambeth Psalter). The manuscript can now be seen in full online at the British Library website.

It has the earliest known cycle of prefatory miniatures in a psalter (f. 7v–16r), a form which became very popular over the following centuries; the 12th-century St. Albans Psalter has one of the best known and fullest of such cycles. The Tiberius cycle depicts the lives of David and Christ, linking them typologically. The miniatures are in a so-called "third style" of late Anglo-Saxon art, "in which the Winchester and Utrecht styles fused and assumed an even greater monumentality". Most of them use with great expressiveness the English tinted outline drawing style which had developed over the previous century; a few use a fully painted style, for example f. 30v, with a portrait of the enthroned David.

Its estimated date has been rather mobile in recent years, moving from "mid-11th century", or "around 1050", to "3rd quarter of the 11th century" according to the British Library in 2016.

The manuscript is incomplete and was damaged in the Cotton Library fire of 1731, removing the top corners of each of the first few pages. It was rebound in 1894, with the folios mounted individually into a book with a larger page size. The 129 original pages are about 248 x 146 mm. After initial material, there are 24 pages with drawings, 5 illustrating the life of David and 11 that of Christ. There is a large initial and illuminated border with Winchester style acanthus foliage at the beginning of the main sections of the book, such as the start of Psalm 1 (f. 31r).

There is a continuous interlinear gloss in Old English of the psalms, and other vernacular material.

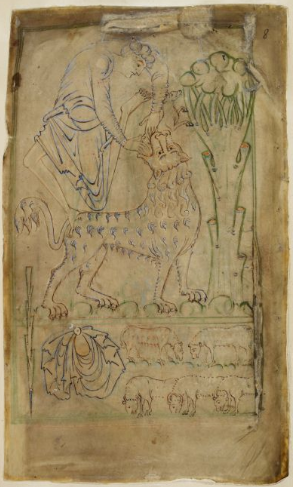
F. 8r, David and the Lion

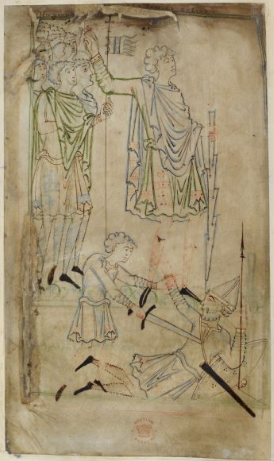
F. 8v, David, facing Goliath

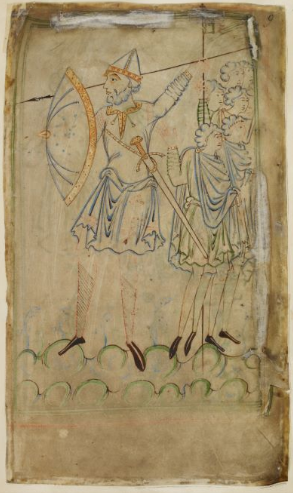
F. 9r, Goliath slain

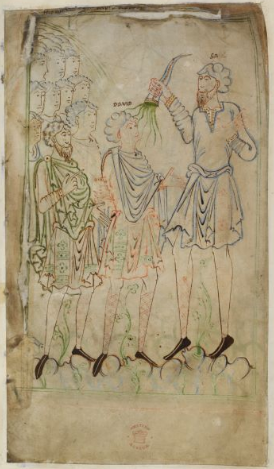
F. 9v, Saul and David

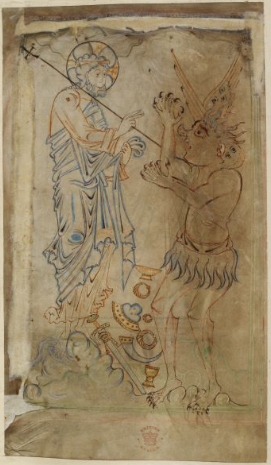
F. 10v, Temptation of Christ

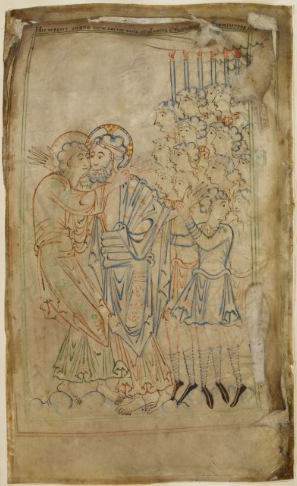
F. 12r, Arrest of Christ

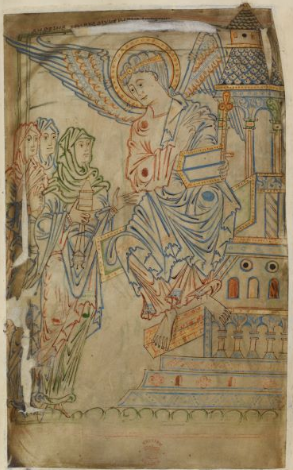
F. 13v, Women at the tomb

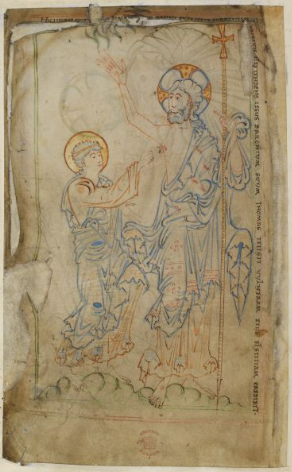
f. 14r. Doubting Thomas

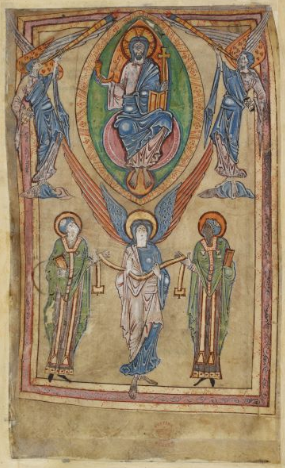
F. 18v, Christ in Majesty

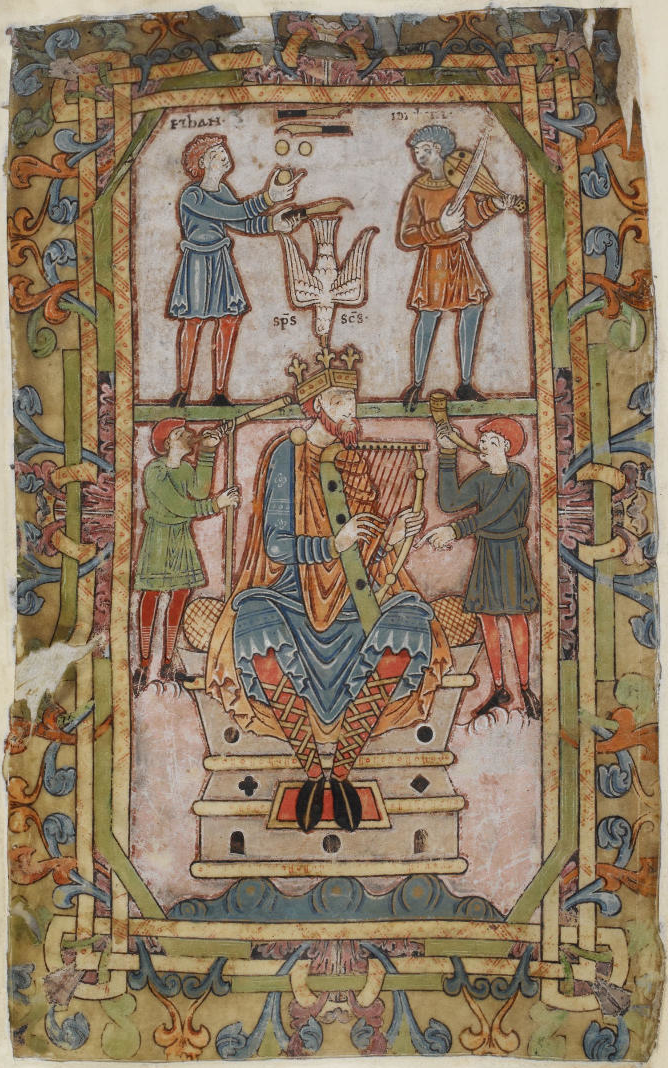
F. 30v, Enthroned David

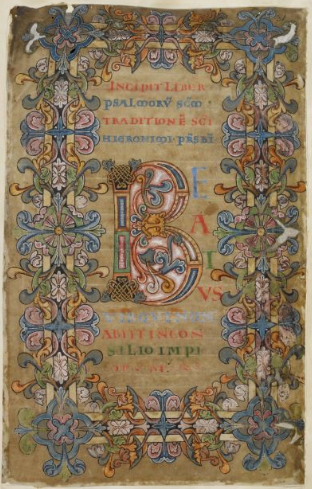
F. 31r Beatus initial

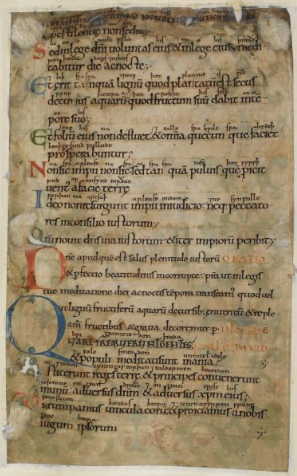
F. 31v Psalm text page
