= Mudil Psalter =

- Location within Egypt
- Coordinates: 28.852405°N 30.932573°E

The Mudil Psalter is a manuscript from the late 4th or early 5th century from Middle Egypt. It was discovered in 1984 in the Coptic cemetery of al-Muḍil (Arabic: المضل), a deserted place some 5 km northeast of the city of al-Fashn. It contains the complete text of the Psalms in the Sahidic dialect of the Coptic language and is the oldest complete Coptic psalter.

The manuscript is written on parchment and bound in wooden boards. It consists of 498 leaves measuring 12.2 × 16.7 cm. The text is written in 21 lines per page.

The Mudil Psalter lay open in a grave beneath the head of a young girl. This burial method may have been based on ancient Egyptian traditions of placing the Egyptian Book of the Dead in a grave. The manuscript is now housed in the Coptic Museum in Cairo under the inventory number 12488 (inventory number 6614 of the Manuscripts Department).

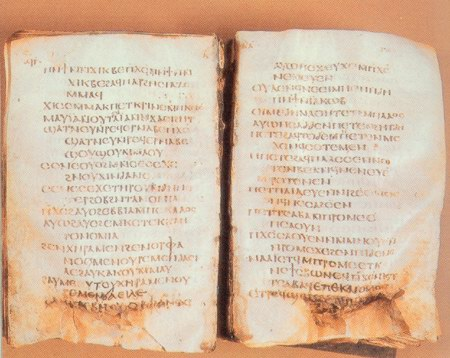
Mudil Psalter

== Literature ==
- Gregor Emmenegger: Der Text des koptischen Psalters aus al-Mudil. Ein Beitrag zur Textgeschichte der Septuaginta und zur Textkritik koptischer Bibelhandschriften, mit der kritischen Neuausgabe des Papyrus 37 der British Library London (U) und des Papyrus 39 der Leipziger Universitätsbibliothek (2013) (= Texte und Untersuchungen zur Geschichte der altchristlichen Literatur, Bd. 159). Walter de Gruyter, Berlin/New York 2007, ISBN 978-3-11-019948-2. (English translation: "The Text of the Coptic Psalter from al-Mudil. A Contribution to the Textual History of the Septuagint and to the Textual Criticism of Coptic Bible Manuscripts, with the Critical New Edition of Papyrus 37 of the British Library London (U) and Papyrus 39 of the Leipzig University Library (2013) (= Texts and Investigations on the History of Early Christian Literature, Vol. 159.")
- Gawdat Gabra: Zur Bedeutung des koptischen Psalmenbuches im oxyrhynchitischen Dialekt Göttinger Miszellen 93 (1986): 37–42. (English translation: Gawdat Gabra: On the Meaning of the Coptic Psalm Book in the Oxyrhynchite Dialect in Göttinger Miszellen 93 (1986): 37–42.)
