= New England Psalter =

The New England Psalter was an early reading textbook for children which was first published in the late 17th century. It was preceded by the hornbook and the primer as early reading texts and by a variety of psalters which were used in religious services. The contents of the New England Psalter included: the Psalms, some of the stories of the Old and New Testament, rules for reading, lessons in spelling, instructions for printing letters, reading verse and the use of capitals. It is significant that during this period of time the laws of England forbade the printing of Bibles outside of Britain. It was considered legal to print the Psalms in America. Once children had completed the lessons in the New England Psalter they proceeded to the Bible, the catechism and the spelling book.

The New England Psalter was reprinted regularly throughout the eighteenth century.
