= Walrus ivory =

Material from the tusks of a walrus

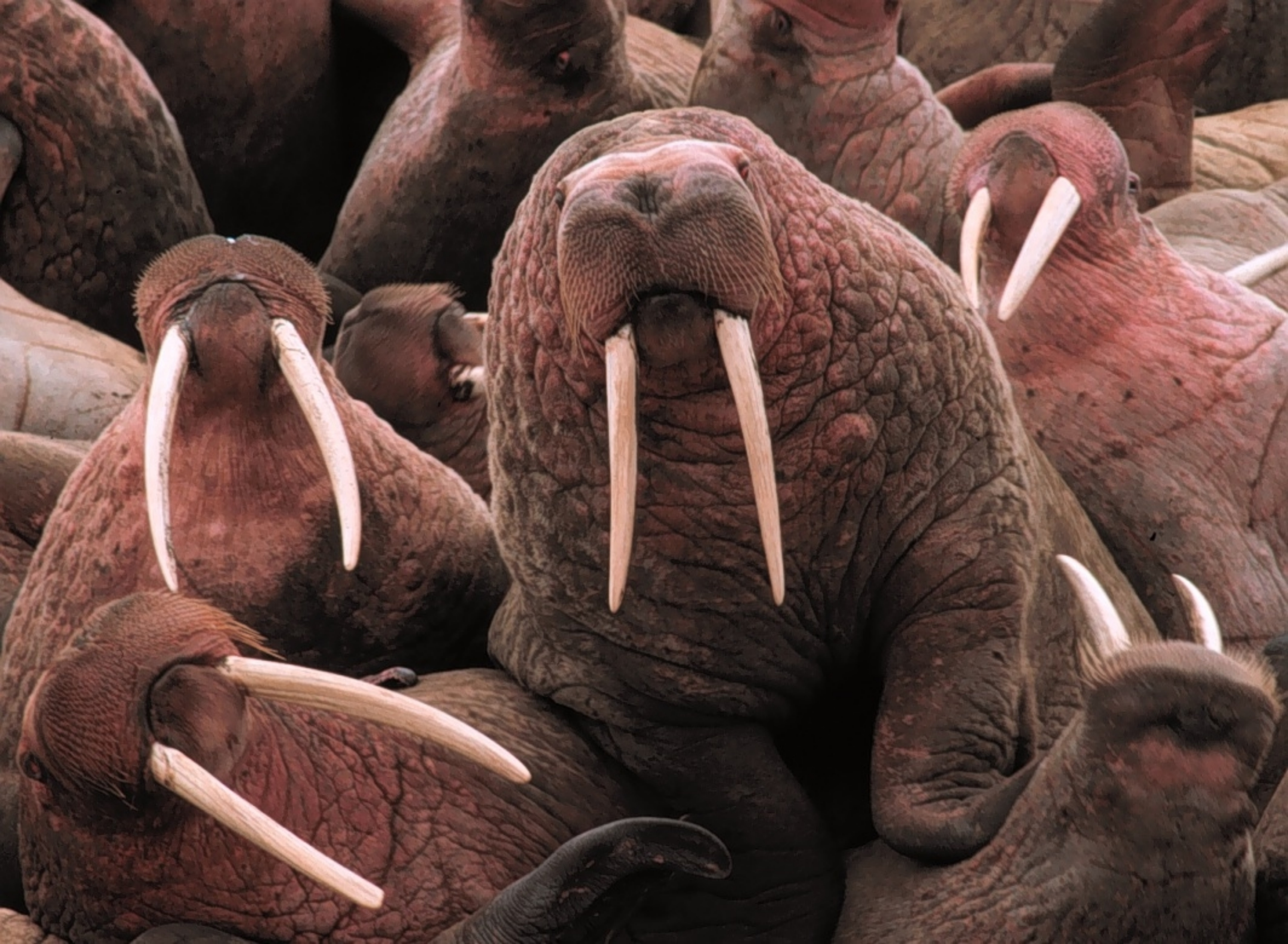
Pacific Walrus at Cape Peirce

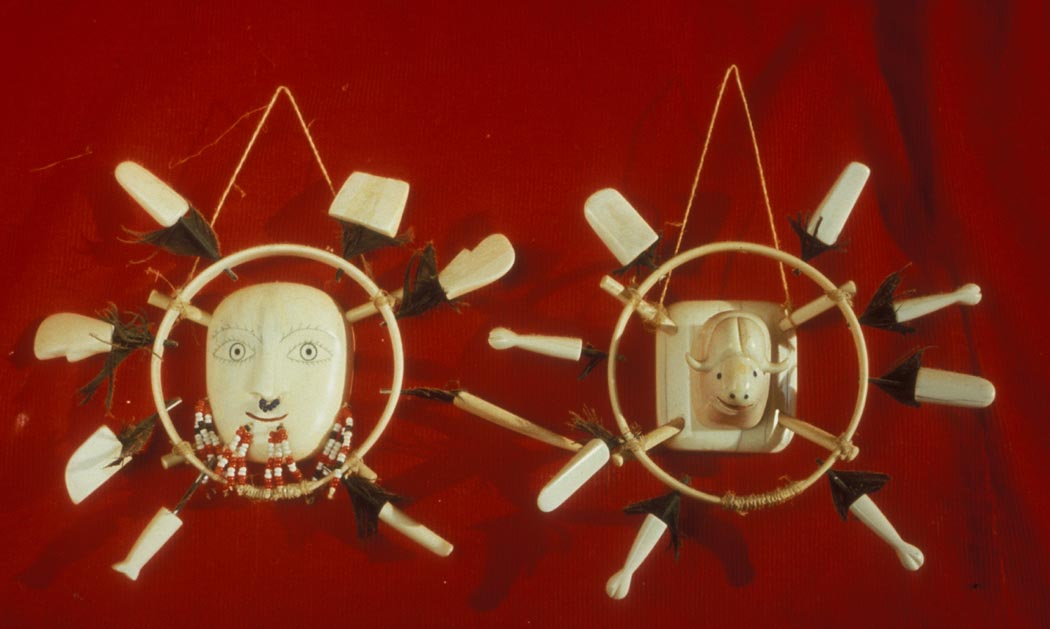
Ceremonial ivory masks produced by Yupik in Alaska

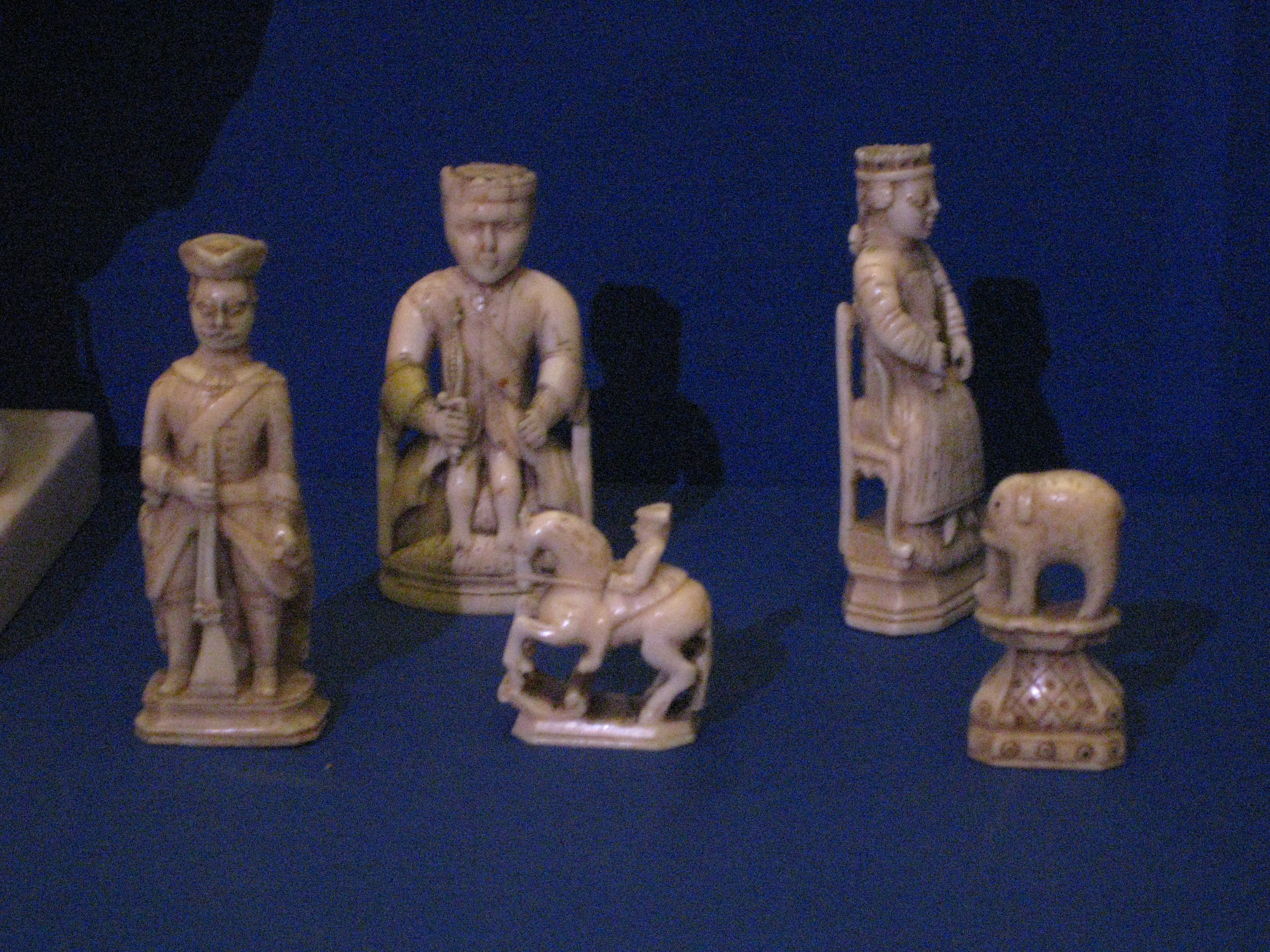
A walrus ivory chess set, mid-18th century, Russia

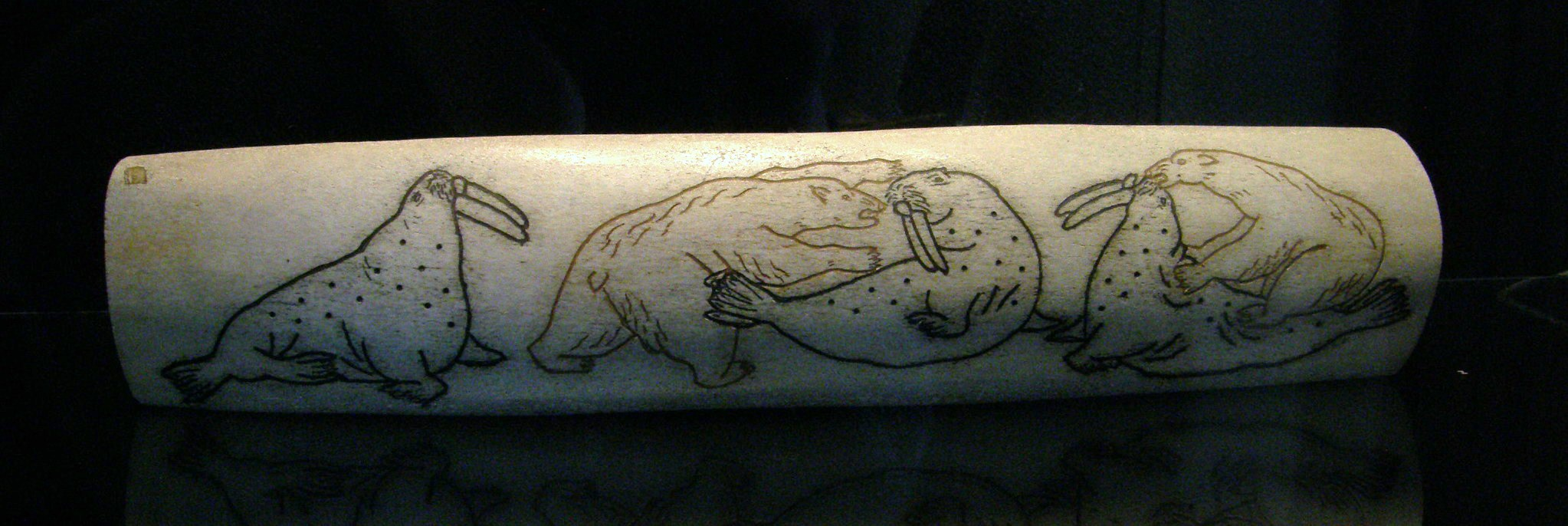
Engraved walrus tusk depicting polar bears attacking walrus, dating from the 1940s in Chukotka (Magadan Regional Museum).

Walrus ivory, also known as morse, comes from two modified upper canines of a walrus. The tusks grow throughout life and may, in the Pacific walrus, attain a length of one metre. Walrus teeth are commercially carved and traded; the average walrus tooth has a rounded, irregular peg shape and is approximately 5 centimetres (2.0 in) in length.

The tip of a walrus tusk has a tooth enamel coating which is worn away during the animal's youth. Fine longitudinal cracks, which appear as radial cracks in cross-section, originate in the cementum and penetrate the dentine. These cracks can be seen throughout the length of the tusk. Whole cross-sections of walrus tusks are generally oval with widely spaced indentations. The dentine is composed of two types: primary dentine and secondary (often called osteodentine). Primary dentine has a classical ivory appearance. Secondary dentine is marble or oatmeal-like.

== Carving ==
Walrus-ivory carving and engraving has been an important folk art for people of the Arctic since prehistoric times, among them the Inuit, Inupiaq and Yupik of Greenland and North America and the Chukchi and Koryak of Russia. The Chukchi and Bering Sea Yupik in particular continue to produce ivory. The folk art of walrus-ivory carving has been popular in European Russia since the Middle Ages, with notable schools of walrus-ivory carving in Kholmogory and Tobolsk. During Soviet times, several walrus carving collectives were established in villages in Chukotka, notably Uelen. International trade is, however, somewhat restricted by the Convention on the International Trade of Endangered Species (CITES).

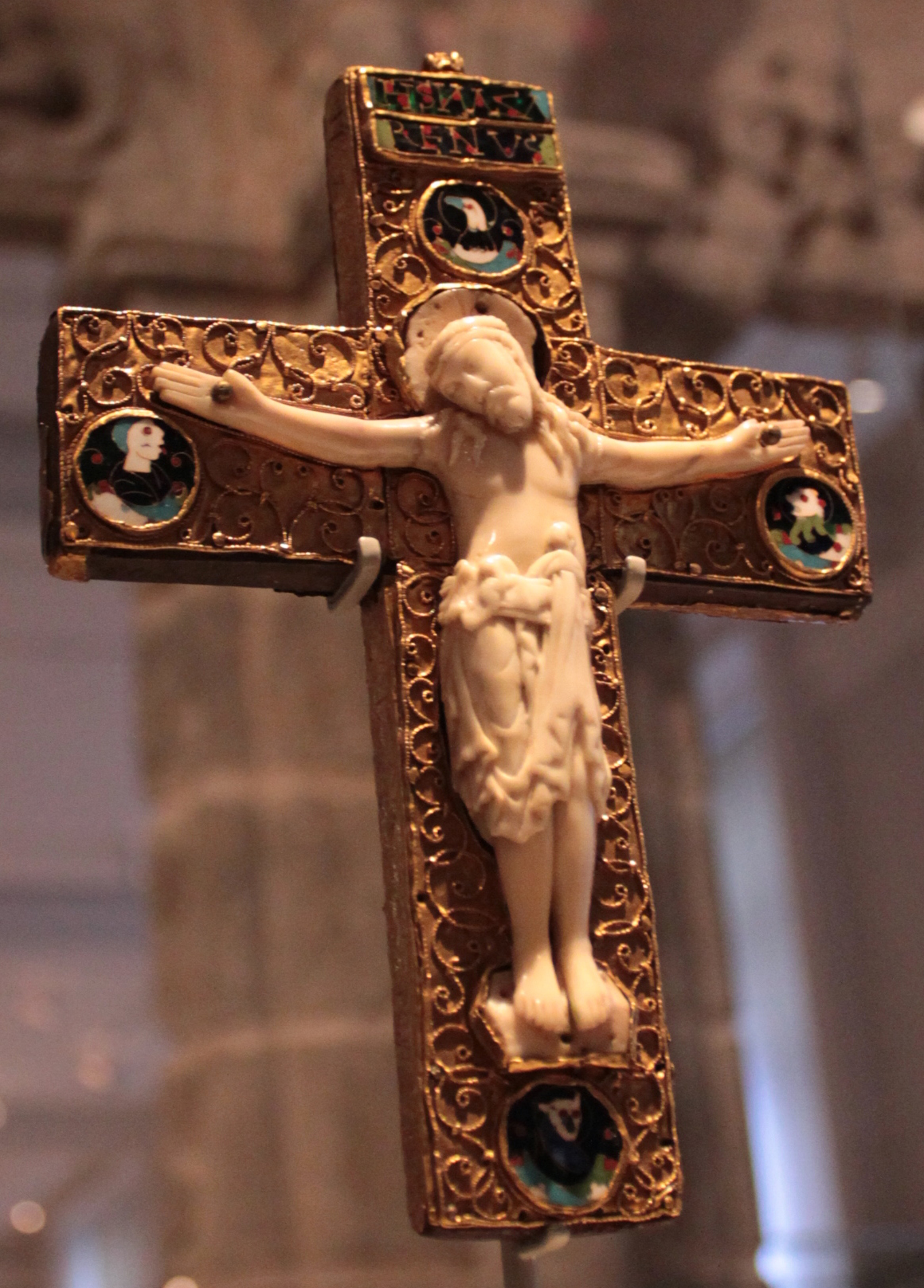
Reliquary Cross, 10th century

In the Early Medieval period, when supplies of elephant ivory reaching Europe reduced or ceased after the Muslim conquests, walrus ivory began to be traded by Vikings into northern Europe as a replacement. King Alfred the Great of Wessex records that he was presented with walrus tusks by the Viking trader Ohthere of Hålogaland in about 890, which may mark the start of this trade. Nearly all ivories in Anglo-Saxon art use walrus, and most northern European ivories of the 11th and 12th centuries. Initially large walrus herds were found much further south than is the case today, and it is likely that their hunting for ivory greatly impacted on populations. Around 1160 northern European ivory carving was greatly reduced, which may well be because the material was less easily available. Around 1260, at the start of the Gothic period, elephant ivory began to reach Europe again, and the industry greatly increased. The Norse also carved items in walrus ivory, notably the Lewis chessmen.

== See also ==
- Ivory trade
- Scrimshaw
