= Psalter of Saint Louis =

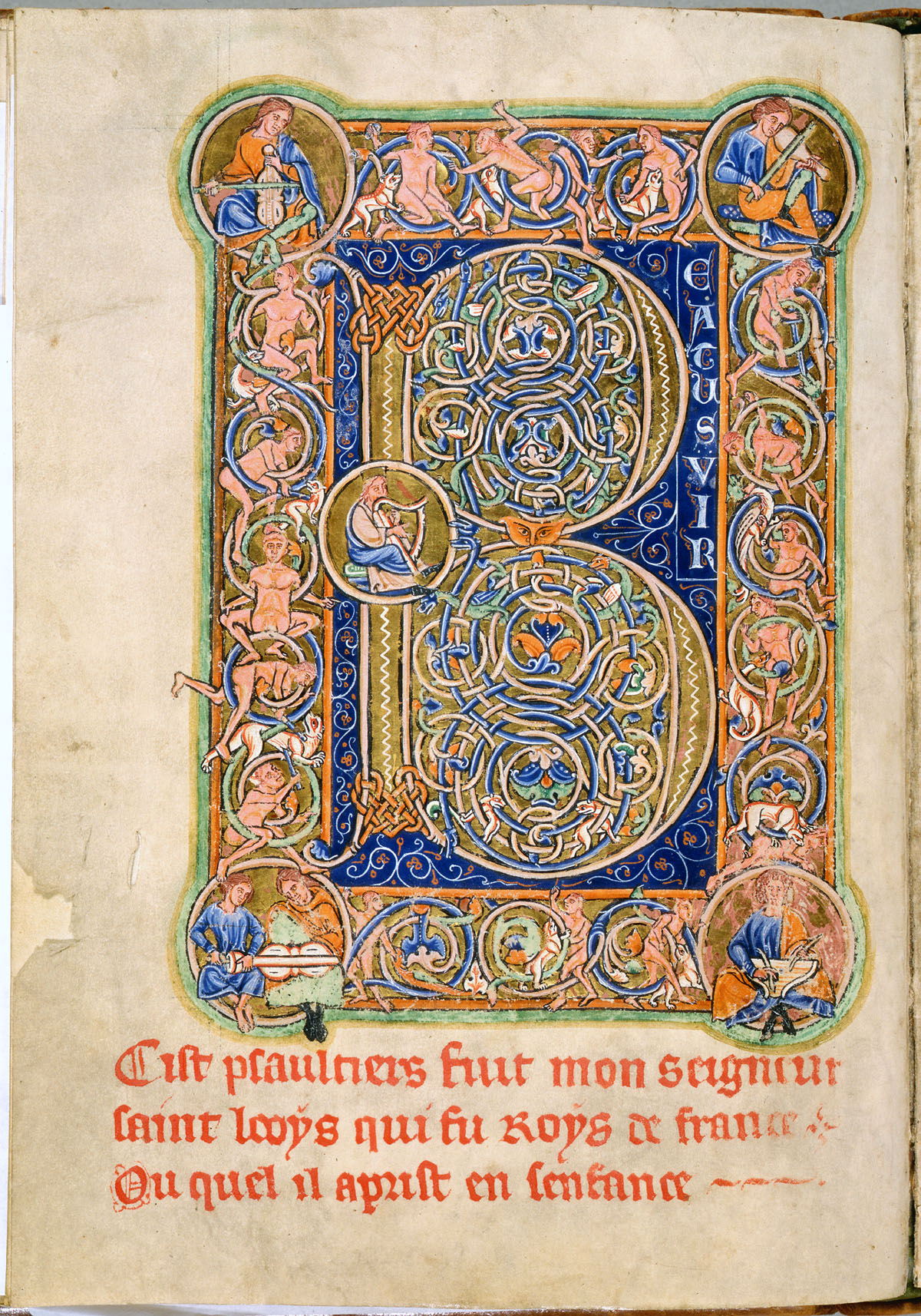
Large Beatus initial from the Leiden Psalter of Saint Louis, with inscription in French recording Louis' use.

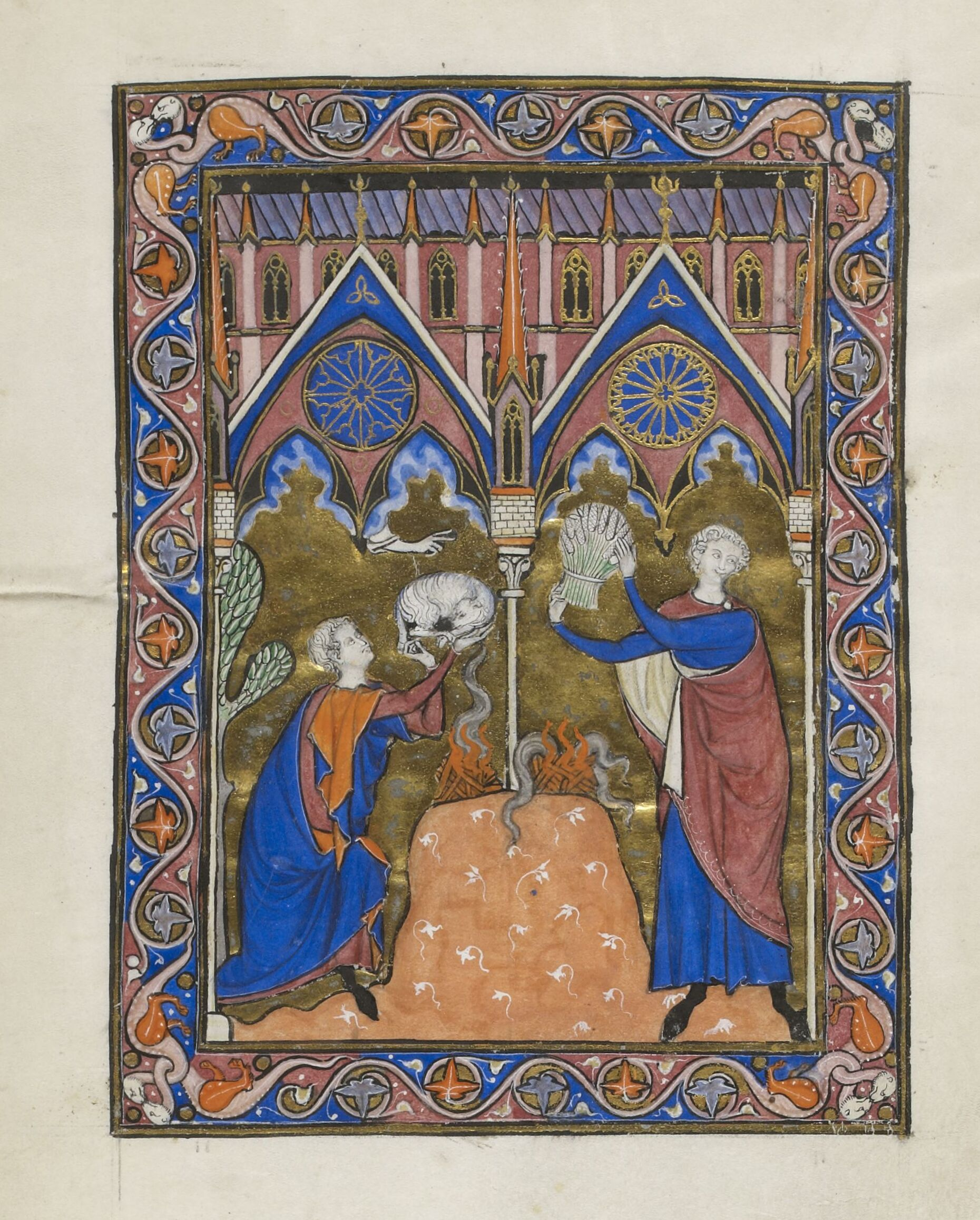
Psalter of Saint Louis - BNF Lat10525 f1v, Cain and Abel making an offering to God

Two lavishly illuminated psalters are known as the Psalter of Saint Louis (and variants) as they have been associated with King Louis IX of France. Now in Paris and Leiden, they are, respectively, examples of French Gothic and English Romanesque illumination.

== Paris, Bibliothèque nationale de France, MS Latin 10525 ==
Until recently, scholars believed that the Paris Psalter of St. Louis (Bibliothèque nationale de France MS Latin 10525) was made for Louis sometime between the death of his mother Blanche of Castile in 1253 and his death in 1270. This is due to a fifteenth-century inscription (written between 1408 and 1422) on folio Av. More recent scholarship, however, has shown that the manuscript was most likely made after Louis's death, sometime between 1270 and 1274, for the marriage of his son Philip III to Marie of Brabant in 1274. Remaining in the royal family for six generations, the book became associated with Louis and seems to have become something of a cult object in the family's veneration of him as a saint. It left the royal library when Charles VI gave it to Marie de France, a religious at Poissy (the place of Louis IX's birth).

The manuscript contains 78 miniatures of Old Testament scenes starting with the story of Cain and Abel and ending with the coronation of Saul, a calendar of feast days, prayers and the 150 psalms.

== Leiden, University Library, BPL 76A ==
The Leiden St Louis Psalter, (Leiden, University Library: BPL 76A), was originally produced for Geoffrey Plantagenet, Archbishop of York, probably in northern England in the 1190s. It is in Latin, with some inscriptions added in French, on parchment, with 185 folios, 24,5 x 17,7 cm. in size, 23 miniatures and historiated initials.

This manuscript passed into the hands of Blanche of Castile after Geoffrey's death, and, as religious manuscripts often were, was used to teach the future saint King Louis IX how to read as a child, as a 14th-century inscription below the Beatus initial (illustrated right) records. After the king's death it passed through a number of royal owners, including the Valois Dukes of Burgundy, being regarded as a relic of the saint, before reaching the Leiden University Library in 1741.

A digital version of the manuscript can be consulted via Leiden University Libraries’ Digital Collections.

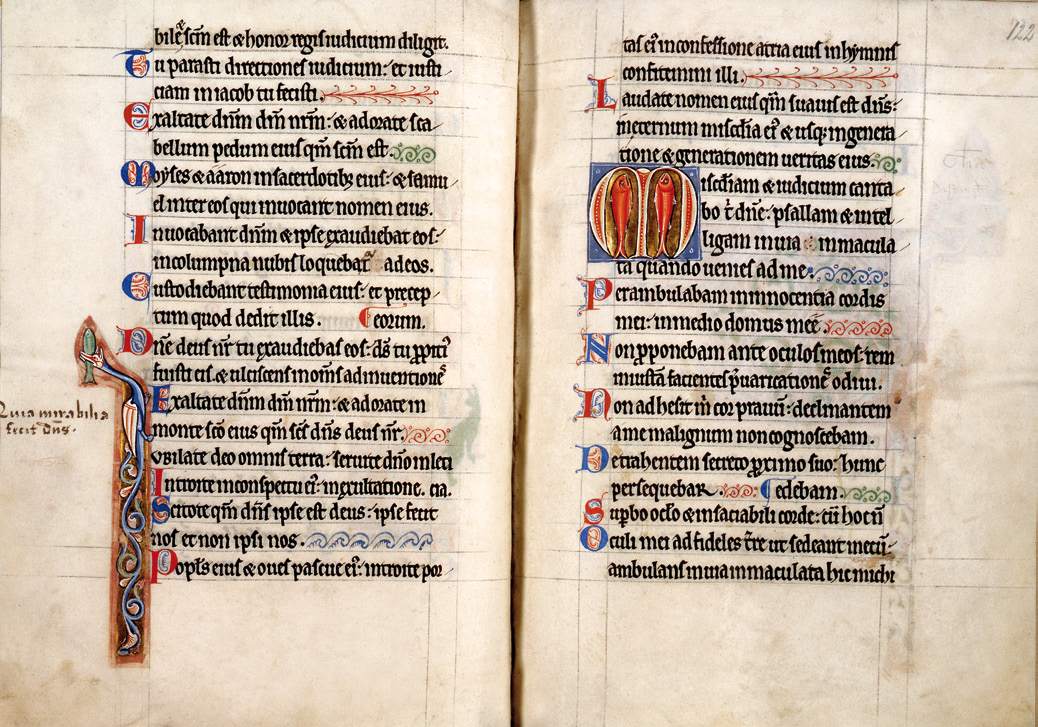
Leiden Saint Louis Psalter page 16 verso-17 recto. Left column latin Vulgate text: bile sanctum est et honor regis judicium diligit. / Tu parasti directiones; judicium et justi- / tiam in Jacob tu fecisti, Psalm 98.

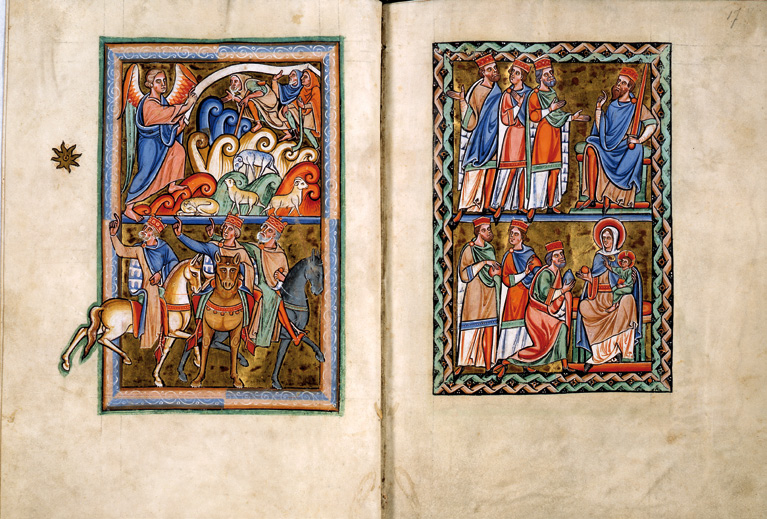
Page 121 verso-122 recto.

== Bibliography ==
- Günter Haseloff, Die Psalterillustration im 13. Jahrhunderts.: Studien zur Geschichte der Buchmalerei in England, Frankreich und den Niederlanden. Inaugural-Dissertation, Georg August Universität zu Göttingen, 1938.
- Victor Leroquais, Les psautiers, manuscrits latins des bibliothèques publiques de France. Mâcon, Protat frères, 1940–41.
- Robert Branner, Manuscript painting in Paris during the reign of Saint Louis : a study of styles. Berkeley: University of California Press, 1977.
- Harvey Stahl, Picturing kingship. History and painting in the Psalter of Saint Louis. University Park, Pa., Pennsylvania State University Press, 2008.
- Patricia Danz Stirnemann, ed., Der Psalter Ludwigs des Heiligen: Ms lat 10525 der Bibliothèque nationale de France. Akademische Druck- und Verlagsanstalt ADEVA: Graz, 2011.
