= Anglo-Saxon reliquary cross =

Ivory figure of Christ set on a cross

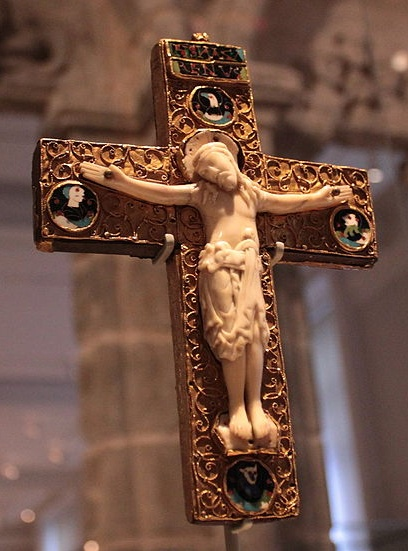

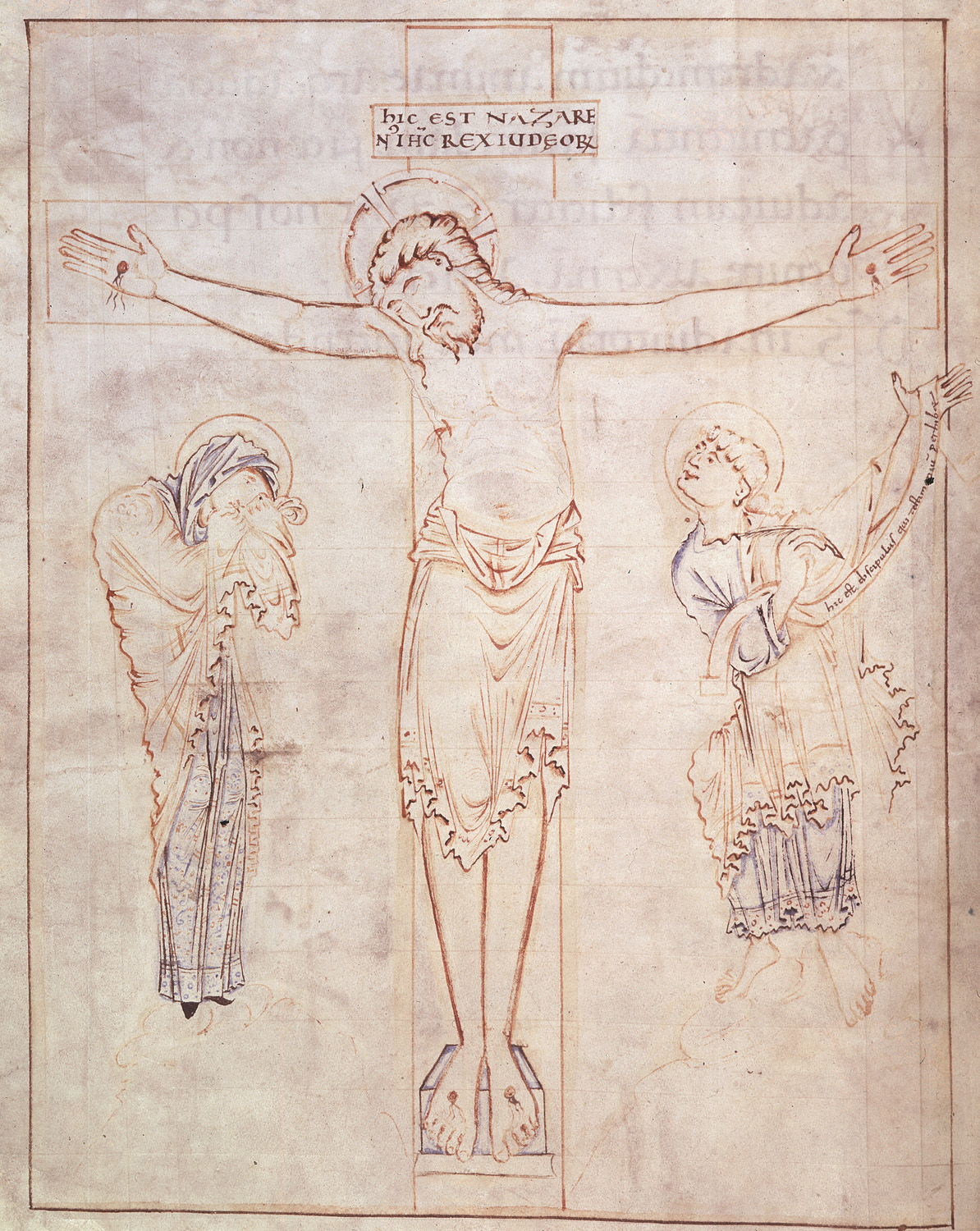
Ramsey Psalter, tinted drawing of the Crucifixion, f.3v

The Reliquary Cross is a late 10th-century Anglo-Saxon ivory figure of Christ, set on an earlier Ottonian cross to make a reliquary in the form of a crucifix. It is in the Victoria and Albert Museum (V&A) in London (Cat. 7943-1862, usually on display in room 8, case 16, in the "Medieval and Renaissance" gallery).

The cross is made of cedar wood and covered with plates of gold filigree work. The corpus or figure of Christ, was probably made in Winchester, and is in walrus ivory; the titulus and medallions are in cloisonné enamel, and apparently also English. The body of the reliquary, because of a technical "trick" in the gold filigree, is thought to be German, around the same date, probably from the area of Aachen and Essen.

The V&A says "the cross is one of the rare surviving pieces which give substance to descriptions in contemporary documentary sources of the sumptuous church furnishings of pre-Conquest England. The enamels are unique in Anglo-Saxon art and may have been made by an English goldsmith familiar with German work. The wood core of the cross was perhaps regarded as a relic of the True Cross. It is most unlikely because of its size and weight, that it was made to be worn as a pectoral cross and more probable that the suspension loop allowed it to hang above an altar or shrine."

== Description ==
The body of the cross is of cedar wood, covered with sheets of gold, the back with repousse decoration now badly crumpled and flattened, the front decorated with filigree work, enamels and an ivory corpus of Christ. This is carved in walrus ivory. Haloed and crowned, the bearded Christ wears an elaborately pleated loin-cloth, knotted through the folded girdle. The head leans towards the right shoulder and the long hair falls in several plaits onto the shoulders. The figure is held in place by golden nails through the palms. The titulus above Christ and four medallions with symbols of the four Evangelists are of cloisonné enamel. The back of the cross shows the Lamb of God and the emblems of the Evangelists in repoussé or beaten work.

The height of the cross is 18.5 cm (7.3 in), the width 13.7 cm (5.4 in), the depth 2.6 cm (1.0 in), the weight 0.22 kg (0.49 lb). The height of the figure is 12.2 cm (4.8 in), the width 10.9 cm (4.3 in).

In 1926, during cleaning work, a human finger, perhaps female, was found in a cavity underneath the corpus. A fragmentary and not totally legible inscription around the edge of the cross seems to list the relics of saints once contained in the cavity beneath the ivory figure of Christ.

'IHS NAZARENUS'
RE(LIQVIE LIGNI) ....VLQ DE...O ET CAMIN....(IHS.XPS) AMD NIS//RV....EDA....DI....DI SIMEONIS ET MAR

Despite Papal disapproval of the dismemberment of saints, a finger relic was by no means unusual in Anglo-Saxon England: King Athelstan bestowed one third of his extensive collection of relics to the monastery of St Mary and St Peter at Exeter in AD 932. The gift included a finger, purportedly that of Mary Magdalene.

David Wilson points to the close similarity between the figure on the cross and that in a tinted drawing in the Ramsey Psalter, dated 980–1000.
