= Psalter of St Germain =

- Bibliothèque nationale de France
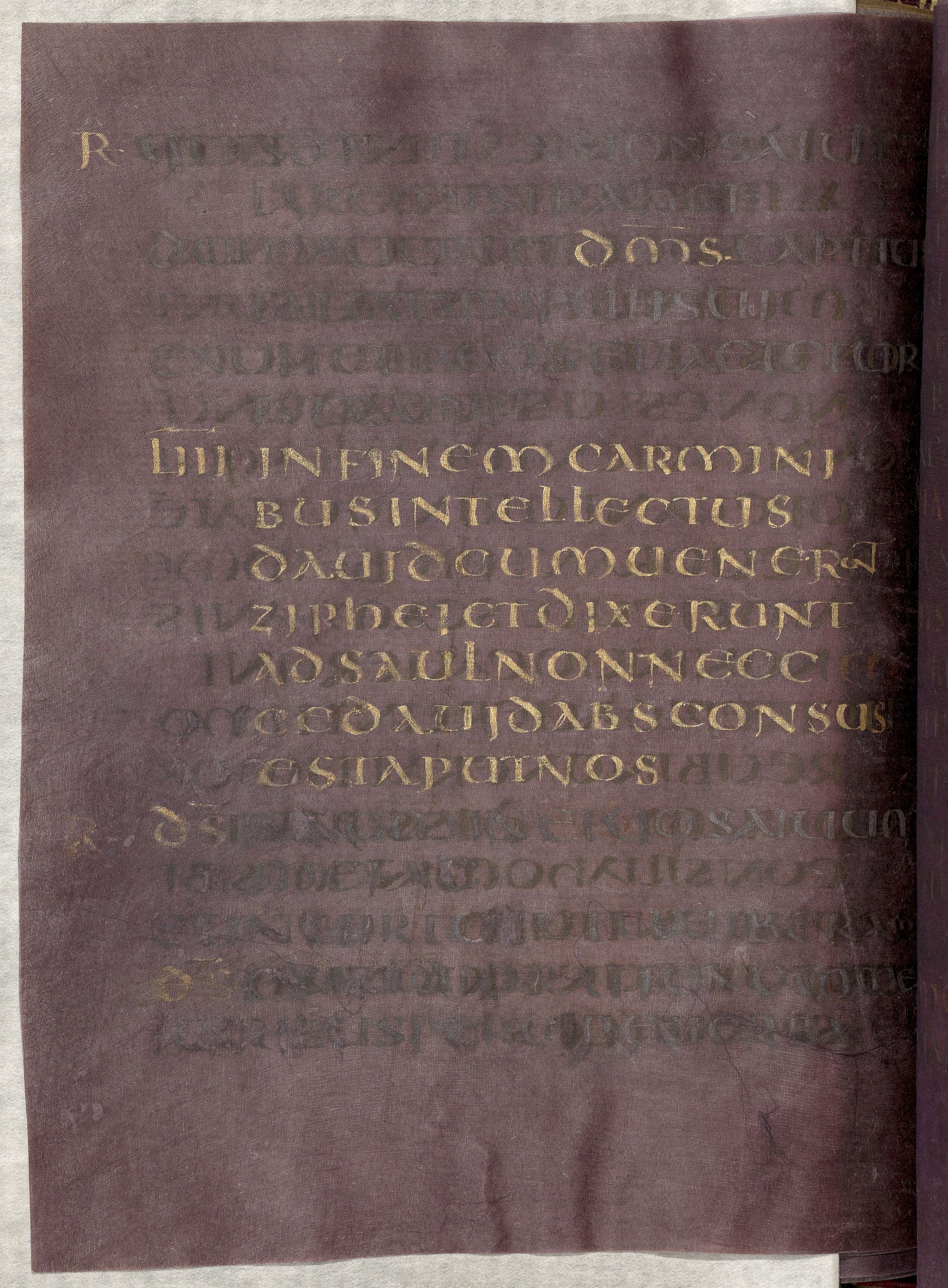
- Beginning of Psalm 53, folio 101^{v}
- Also known as: Psautier pourpré de saint Germain, Bibliothèque nationale de France MS Latin 11947
- Type: Psalter
- Date: 6th century
- Language: Latin
- Material: Purple parchment
- Size: 22 centimetres (8.7 in) x 27.5 centimetres (10.8 in)
- Script: Uncial
- Previously kept: Abbey of Saint-Germain-des-Prés
- Accession: 1795–1796

The Psalter of St Germain is an illuminated manuscript dating from the 6th century. It comes from the Abbey of Saint-Germain-des-Prés in Paris. It is a psalter, in the version of the Vetus Latina, which could date back to the period of the founder of the abbey, Saint Germain of Paris. It is currently kept at the Bibliothèque nationale de France.

== History ==
According to legend, the manuscript was brought back by the Frankish king Childebert I from an expedition to Spain, and given (with the golden cross and the tunic of Saint Vincent) to the abbey of Saint-Germain-des-Prés in Paris. If so, it would have been used by the founder of the latter, Germain of Paris; however, there is no evidence to prove this. Its text is close to the versions of the psalms which circulated in Gallia Lugdunensis at the end of Antiquity, which is compatible with its being present at the origins of this abbey.

The manuscript is attested in the inventories of relics of Saint-Germain Abbey from 1269. Jacques du Breul, librarian of the abbey, added a descriptive note at the beginning of the manuscript in 1560. He also made a complete copy of the text, which is still kept at the Bibliothèque nationale de France (MS Lat. 13163). This copy serves as the basis of the edition of the text included in the second volume of Bibliorum Sacrorum latinae versiones antiquae by the Benedictine Petrus Sabatier in 1743.

After the closure of the abbey in 1791, the collection of manuscripts was sequestered, saved from a fire in 1794, then given to the Bibliothèque nationale in 1795–1796.

== Description ==
The text of the manuscript contains the Psalms in the version called Vetus Latina, which is older than the Vulgate of Saint Jerome. It is written on 291 folios on parchment entirely tinted with purple. The writing is made of large uncials, well spaced and regular. This writing is similar to Italian manuscripts from the same period. It is silver in colour, except for the titles of psalms, the Nomina sacra or names of God, and the word diapsalma; in all these cases the writing is gold in colour. This is also true of the crossed out letter R, present in certain margins: it indicates the refrains that the faithful had to sing. These mentions attest to the liturgical use of the manuscript and the responses during the service. It was a ceremonial copy, reminiscent of other rare manuscripts from this period, between Late Antiquity and the early Middle Ages, such as the Codex Argenteus.
