= In cotidianis precibus =

24 March 1945 motu proprio from Pope Pius XII

In cotidianis precibus Latin for 'In daily prayers' Motu proprio of Pope Pius XII
- Signature date: 24 March 1945
- Subject: the new Latin translation of the Psalm to be used in the liturgy
- AAS: 37: 65–67

In cotidianis precibus (English: In daily prayers) is a motu proprio from Pope Pius XII dated 24 March 1945, regarding the new Latin translation of the Psalms to be used in the liturgy.

The Latin translation used hitherto had in earlier times been the one made from the Greek Septuagint by Jerome. According to the Pope, Jerome also realised that there must have been flaws in this translation of a translation, and that is why he translated the psalms directly from the Hebrew. However, this latter translations from the original Hebrew did not find its way into the tradition of the Catholic Church, while the Latin translation of the Septuagint became the common translation. This translation from the Septuagint was added to the breviary of Pope Pius V. Only in the course of the centuries, the Pope says, has the full richness of the original texts (in Hebrew) become apparent, especially through translations made - with the permission of the ecclesiastical authorities - directly from Hebrew into various vernacular languages.

Since the psalmists were inspired by the Holy Ghost, it is helpful to have translations that are as close as possible to the intentions of the original texts; all this - Pius writes - in accordance with his previously published encyclical Divino afflante Spiritu.

It is for this reason that the Pope decided to commission the production of a new translation of the Psalms, taking into account the tradition of the Vulgate, and using the new techniques and insights of textual criticism.

The work to produce the new translation was given by the Pope to the Pontifical Biblical Institute. In this motu proprio, the pope decides that this new translation must henceforth be used in the Hours:

We hope that henceforth all will draw from the recitation of the Divine Office more and more light, grace and consolation which will enlighten them and push them, in these difficult times that the Church is going through, to imitate these examples of holiness that the Psalms present with such brilliance. We hope that they will find more and more strength in it and that they will be stimulated to nurture and warm those feelings of love for God, of intrepid strength, of pious penance that the Holy Spirit raises in souls to the occasion of the reading of the psalms.
