= Psalter =

Volume containing the Book of Psalms

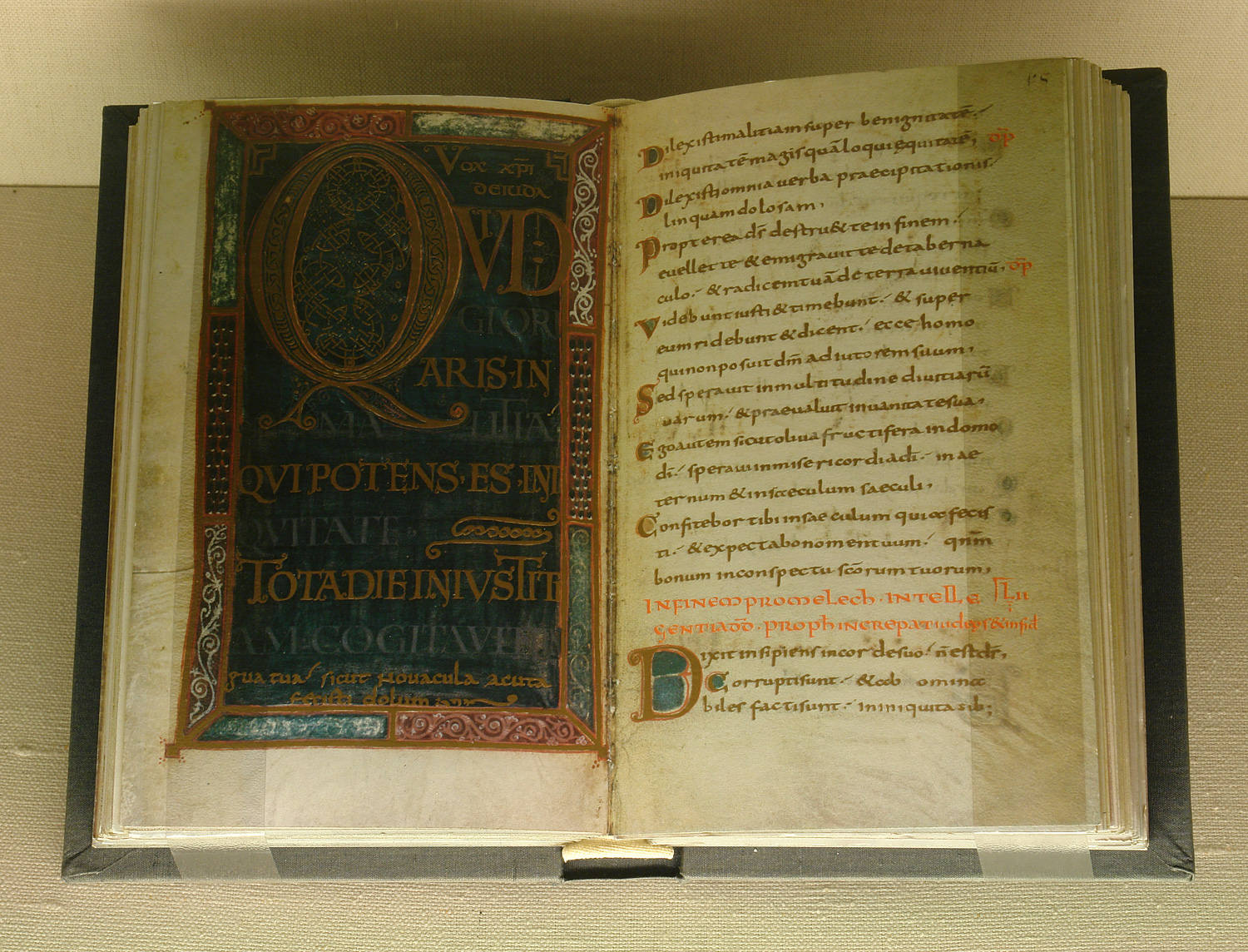
Carolingian Psalter (facsimile)

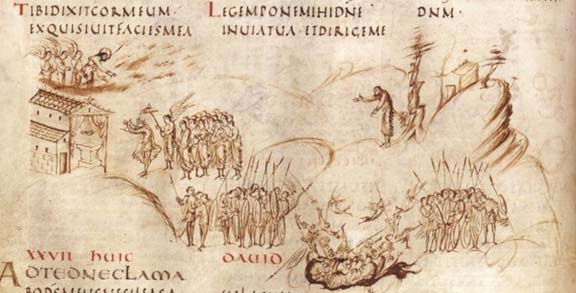
Folio 15b of the Utrecht Psalter illustrates Psalm 27

A psalter is a volume containing the Book of Psalms, often with other devotional material bound in as well, such as a liturgical calendar and litany of the Saints. Until the emergence of the book of hours in the Late Middle Ages, psalters were the books most widely owned by wealthy lay persons. They were commonly used for learning to read. Many psalters were richly illuminated, and they include some of the most spectacular surviving examples of medieval book art.

The English term (Old English psaltere, saltere) derives from Church Latin. The source term is Latin: psalterium, which is simply the name of the Book of Psalms (in secular Latin, it is the term for a stringed instrument, from Ancient Greek: ψαλτήριον psalterion). The Book of Psalms contains the bulk of the Divine Office of the Roman Catholic Church. The other books associated with it were the Lectionary, the Antiphonary, and Responsoriale, and the Hymnary. In Late Modern English, psalter has mostly ceased to refer to the Book of Psalms (as the text of a book of the Bible) and mostly refers to the dedicated physical volumes containing this text.

== Western Christianity ==
Dedicated psalters, as distinct from copies of the Psalms in other formats, e.g. as part of a full edition of the Old Testament, were first developed in the Latin West in the 6th century in Ireland and from about 700 on the continent.

The extensively illustrated Utrecht Psalter is one of the most important surviving Carolingian manuscripts and exercised a major influence on the later development of Anglo-Saxon art. In the Middle Ages psalters were among the most popular types of illuminated manuscripts, rivaled only by the Gospel Books, from which they gradually took over as the type of manuscript chosen for lavish illumination. From the late 11th century onwards they became particularly widespread - Psalms were recited by the clergy at various points in the liturgy, so psalters were a key part of the liturgical equipment in major churches.

Various different schemes existed for the arrangement of the Psalms into groups (see Latin Psalters). As well as the 150 Psalms, medieval psalters often included a calendar, a litany of saints, canticles from the Old and New Testaments, and other devotional texts. The selection of saints mentioned in the calendar and litany varied greatly and can often give clues as to the original ownership of the manuscript, since monasteries and private patrons alike would choose those saints that had particular significance for them.

Many psalters were lavishly illuminated with full-page miniatures as well as decorated initials. Of the initials the most important is normally the so-called "Beatus initial", based on the "B" of the words Beatus vir... ("Blessed is the man...") at the start of Psalm 1. This was usually given the most elaborate decoration in an illuminated psalter, often taking a whole page for the initial letter or first two words. Historiated initials or full-page illuminations were used to mark the beginnings of the major divisions of the Psalms, or the various daily readings, and may have helped users navigate to the relevant part of the text, as medieval books almost never had page numbers.

Many psalters, particularly from the 12th century onwards, included a richly decorated "prefatory cycle" –a series of full-page illuminations preceding the Psalms, usually illustrating the Passion story, though some also featured Old Testament narratives. Such images helped to enhance the book's status, and served as aids to contemplation in the practice of personal devotions.

The psalter is also a part of either the Horologion or the breviary, used to say the Liturgy of the Hours in the Eastern and Western Christian worlds respectively.

== Eastern Christianity ==
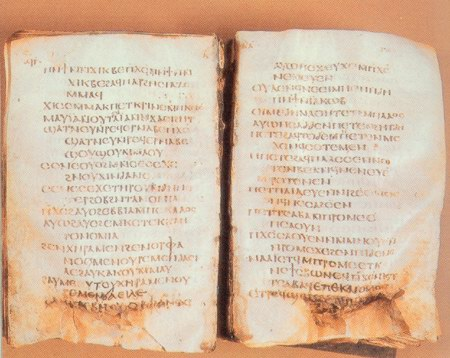
The Mudil Psalter, the oldest complete psalter in the Coptic language, Coptic Museum, Egypt, Coptic Cairo

Non-illuminated psalters written in Coptic include some of the earliest surviving codices (bound books) altogether. The earliest Coptic psalter predates the earliest Western (Irish) one by more than a century. The Mudil Psalter, the oldest complete Coptic psalter, dates to the 5th century. It was found in the Al-Mudil Coptic cemetery in a small town near Beni Suef, Egypt. The codex was in the grave of a young girl, open, with her head resting on it. Scholar John Gee has argued that this represents a cultural continuation of the ancient Egyptian tradition of placing the Book of the Dead in tombs and sarcophagi.

The Pahlavi Psalter is a fragment of a Middle Persian translation of a Syriac version of the Book of Psalms, dated to the 6th or 7th century. In Orthodox Christianity, the Book of Psalms for liturgical purposes is divided into 20 kathismata or "sittings", for reading at Vespers and Matins. Kathisma means sitting, since the people normally sit during the reading of the psalms. Each kathisma is divided into three stases, from stasis, to stand, because each stasis ends with Glory to the Father..., at which everyone stands.

The reading of the kathismata are arranged so that the entire psalter is read through in the course of a week. During Great Lent it is read through twice in a week. During Bright Week (Easter Week) there is no reading from the Psalms. Orthodox psalters usually contain the Biblical canticles, which are read at the canon of Matins during Great Lent.

The established Orthodox tradition of Christian burial has included reading the Psalms in the church throughout the vigil, where the deceased remains the night before the funeral, a reflection of the vigil of Holy Friday. Some Orthodox psalters also contain special prayers for the departed for this purpose. While the full tradition is showing signs of diminishing in practice, the psalter is still sometimes used during a wake.

== Significant psalters ==
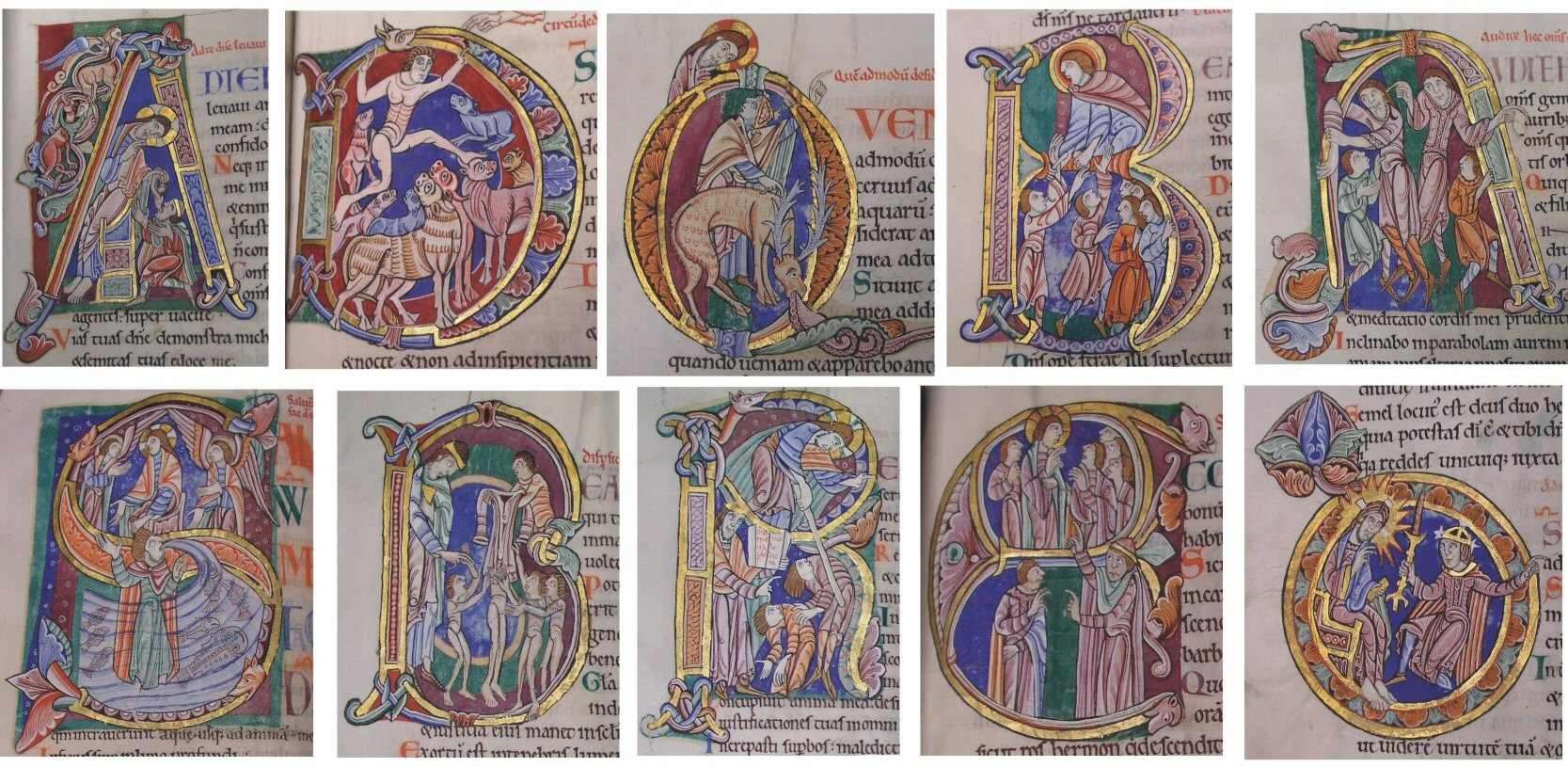
Initials from the beginning of psalms in the St. Albans Psalter.

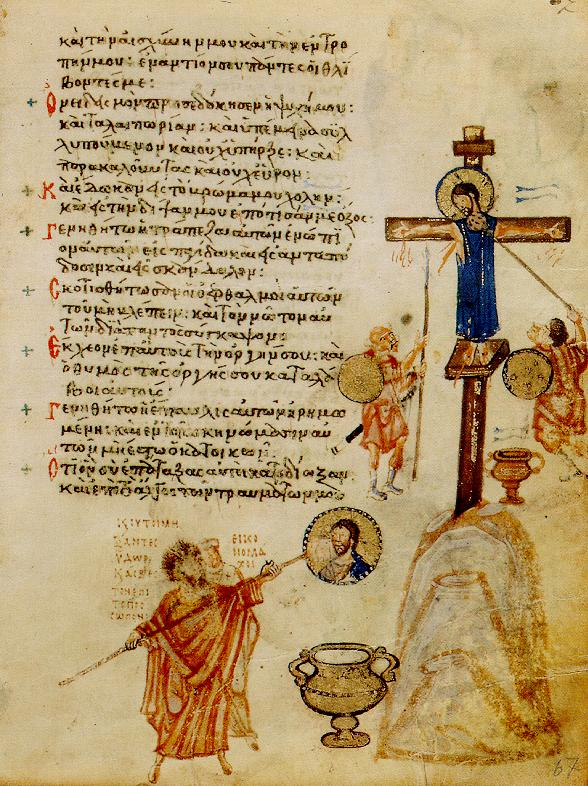
A page from the Chludov Psalter, 9th century

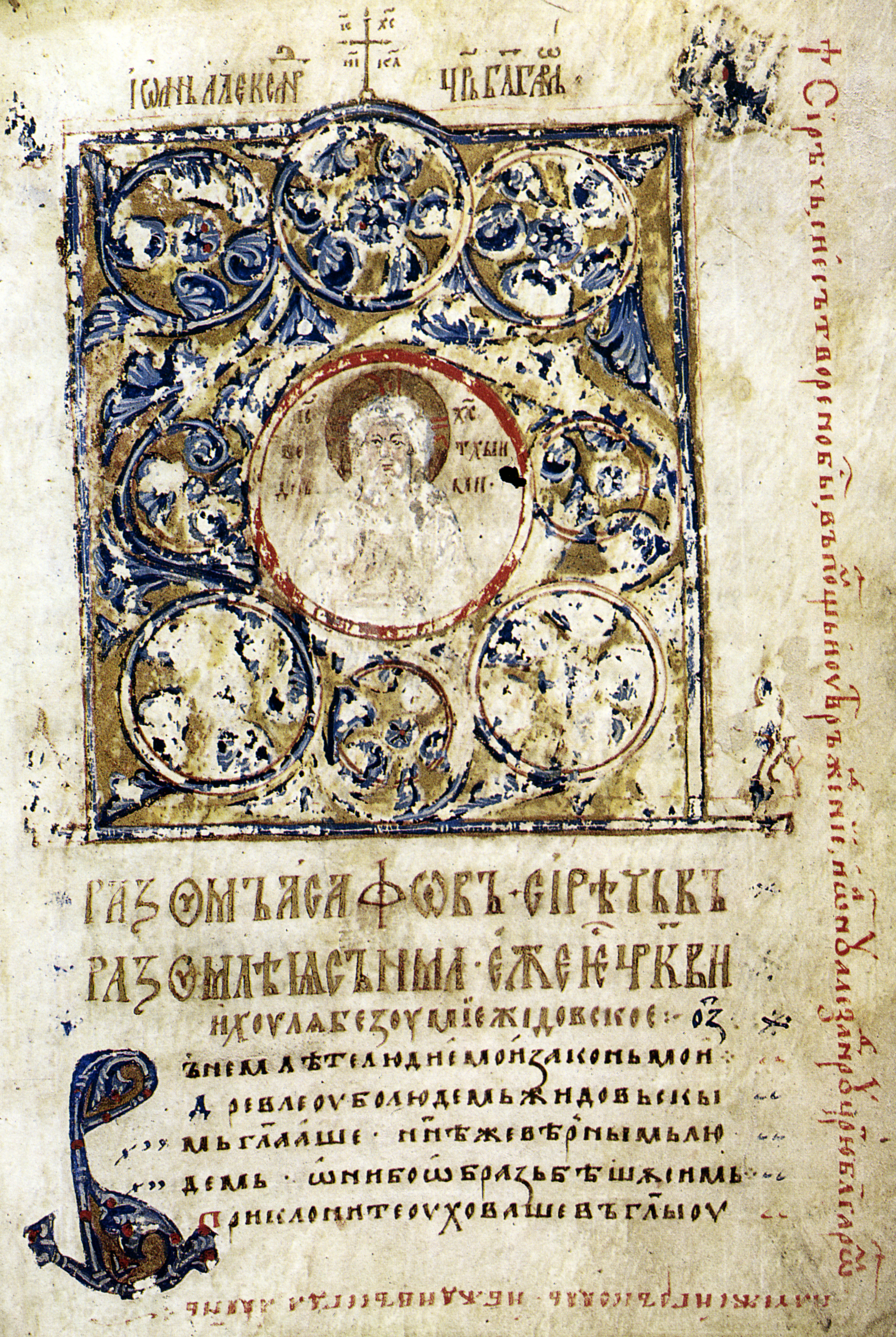
The Sofia Psalter, 1337

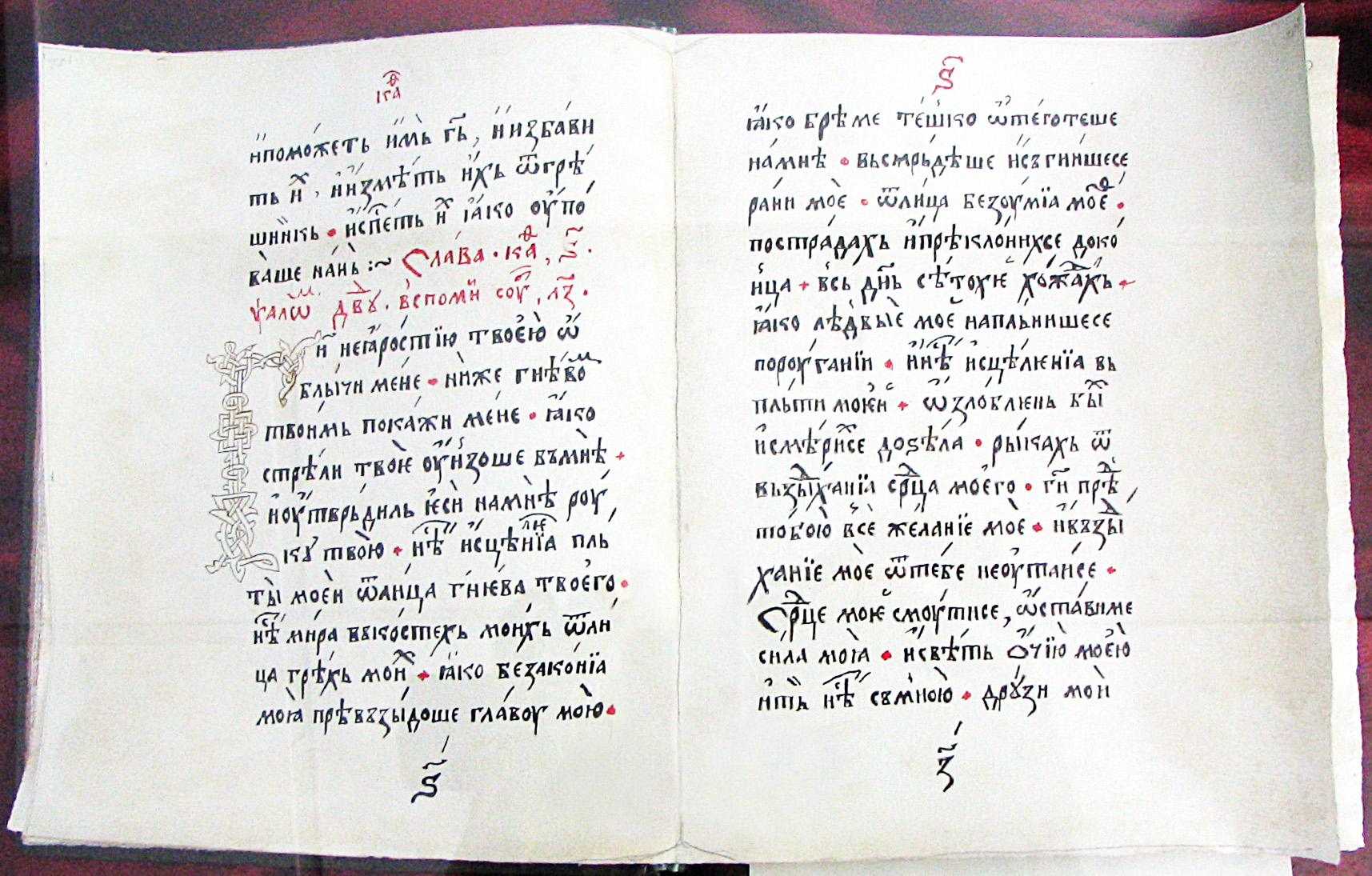
The Psalter of Jerotej Račanin, 1700

=== Manuscripts ===
See also Category:Illuminated psalters

==== Early Medieval ====
- Psalter of St. Germain of Paris, 6th century
- Cathach of St. Columba, early 7th century
- Faddan More Psalter
- Vespasian Psalter, 2nd quarter of the 8th century
- Montpellier Psalter
- Chludov Psalter, 3rd quarter of the 9th century
- Southampton Psalter
- Utrecht Psalter, 9th century
- Salaberga Psalter
- Stuttgart Psalter
- Lothair Psalter, 840–855, British Library, Add. MS 37768

==== High Medieval ====
- Paris Psalter, 10th century
- Ramsey Psalter
- Gertrude Psalter, late 10th century with mid-11th century illuminations
- Theodore Psalter, 1066, at the British Library
- Psalterium Sinaiticum, 11th century
- Melisende Psalter, circa 1135
- Eadwine Psalter, c 1160
- Harley Psalter
- St. Albans Psalter
- Winchester Psalter
- Westminster Psalter
- Felbrigge Psalter
- Great Canterbury Psalter (Anglo-Catalan Psalter or Paris Psalter), c.1200 and 1340s
- Psalter of St. Louis
- Ormesby Psalter, start 13th century, Bodleian Library
- Potocki Psalter, mid 13th century, now Warsaw with detached leaves elsewhere.
- Mansfield Psalter, late 13th century.

==== Late Medieval ====
- Queen Mary Psalter
- Luttrell Psalter
- Gorleston Psalter
- Macclesfield Psalter
- Tickhill Psalter
- Sofia Psalter
- Tomich Psalter
- "MS 232/15 Psalter at OPenn".
- Kiev Psalter of 1397
- Psalter of Jean, Duc de Berry
- Burnet Psalter
- Rushall Psalter, 15th century.

==== Early modern / Tudor period ====
- Psalter of Henry VIII
- Daskal Philip Psalter
- "1953‑128‑7 Liturgical psalter at OPenn". openn.library.upenn.edu.

=== Printed editions ===
See also Category:Psalters

==== Incunabula ====
- Psalterium Romanum, 1457 [Mainz], Johann Fust and Peter Schöffer. The first printed psalter.
- Psalterium Benedictinum, 1459 [Mainz], Johann Fust and Peter Schöffer. The second printed psalter.

==== Early modern editions ====
- Coverdale's Psalter, 1535
- Genevan Psalter, 1562
- David's Psalter, a translation of the Book of Psalms into Polish by Jan Kochanowski, 1579
- Scottish Psalter, 1635 and 1650
- Bay Psalm Book, 1640, the first book printed in British North America. The Psalms in it are metrical translations into English.
- New England Psalter

==== Modern editions ====
- Grail Psalms, 1963, 2008
- ICEL Psalter, 1995

== See also ==
- Metrical psalter
- Book of Hours
- Latin Psalters
- Pahlavi Psalter
- Psalms
