= Beatus vir =

Opening words of Psalm 1 and 111/112

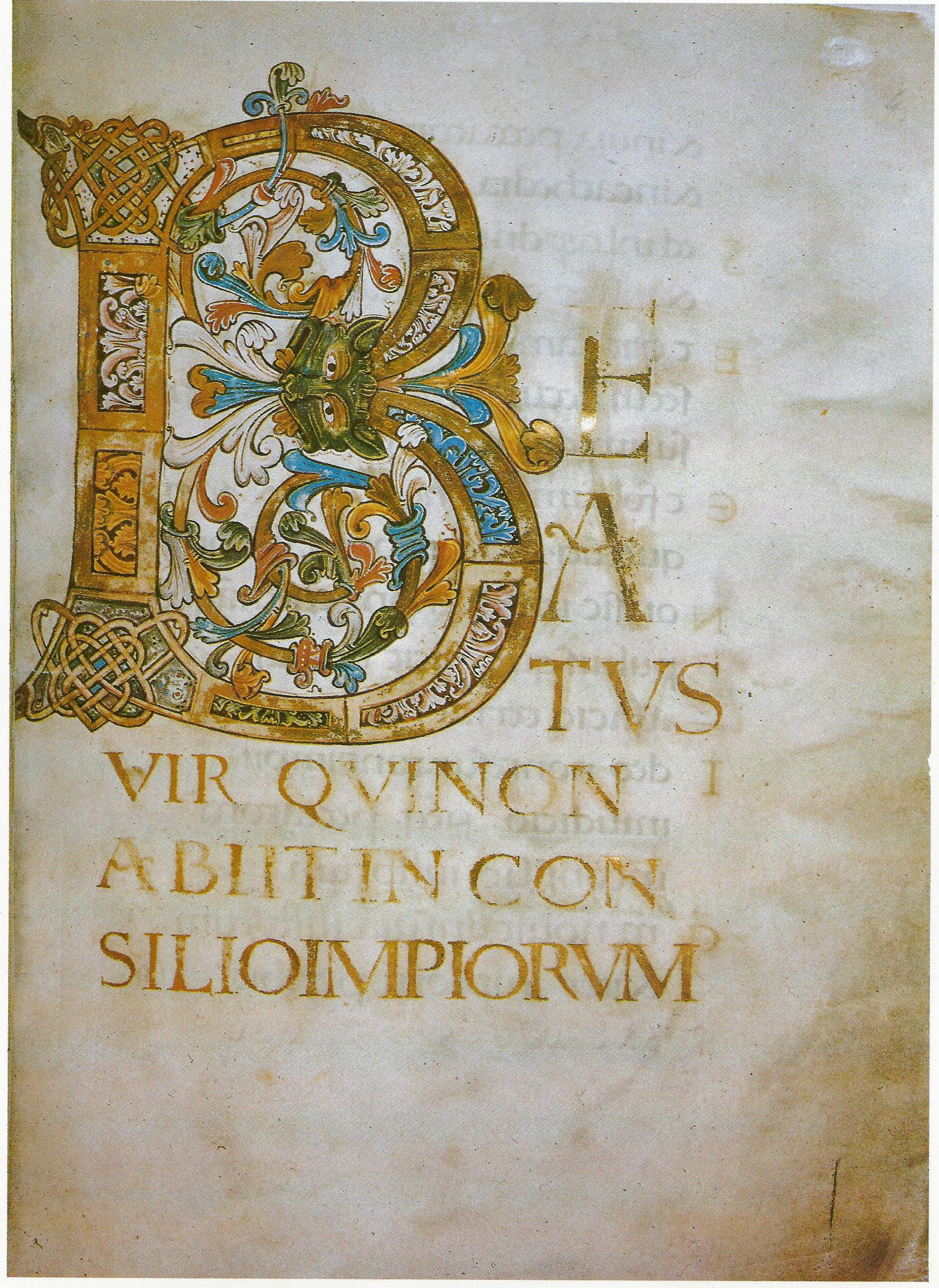
Beatus initial, f.4, start of Psalm 1 in the 10th-century Anglo-Saxon Ramsey Psalter

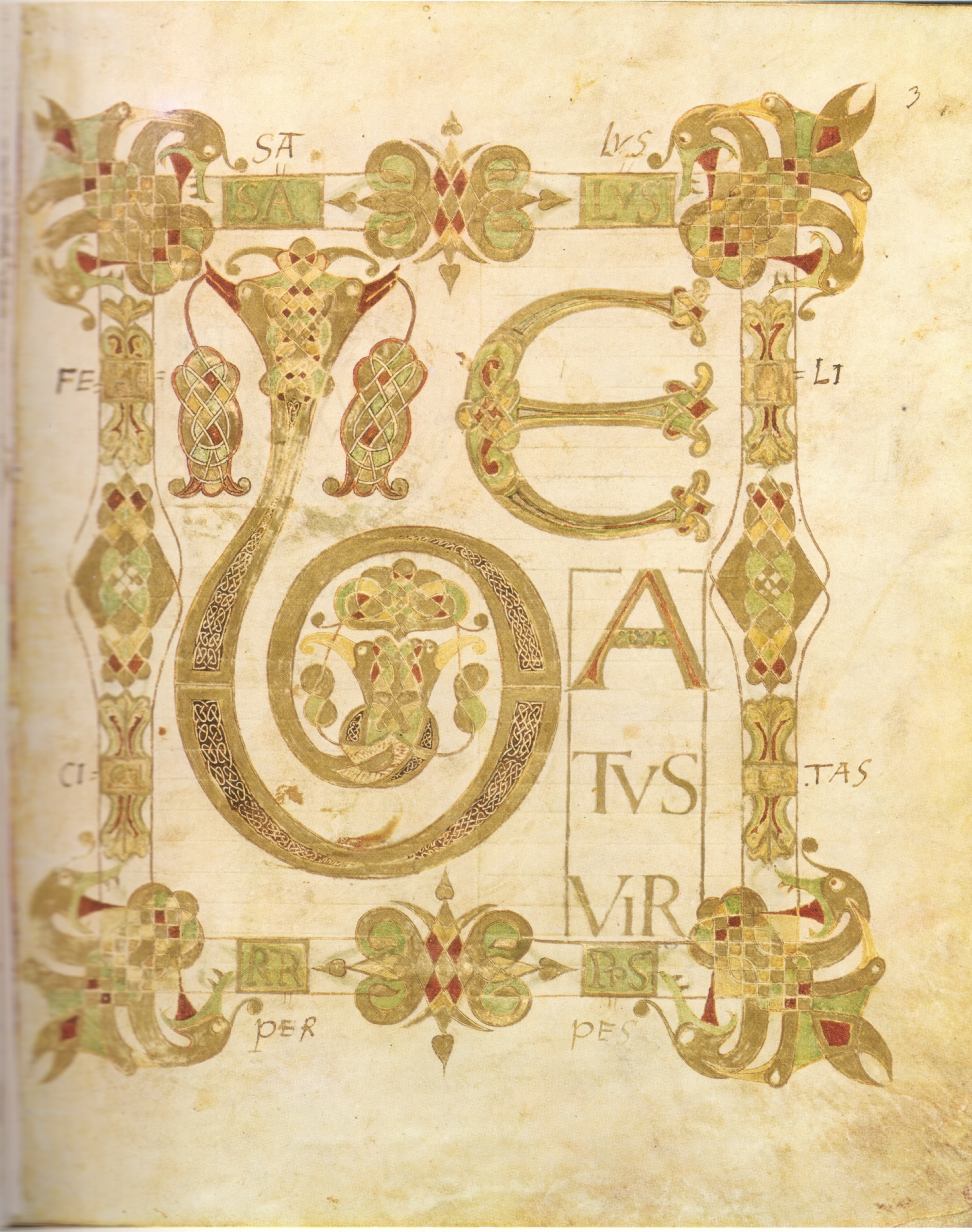
Beatus vir takes up the whole page in the 9th-century Ludwig Psalter.

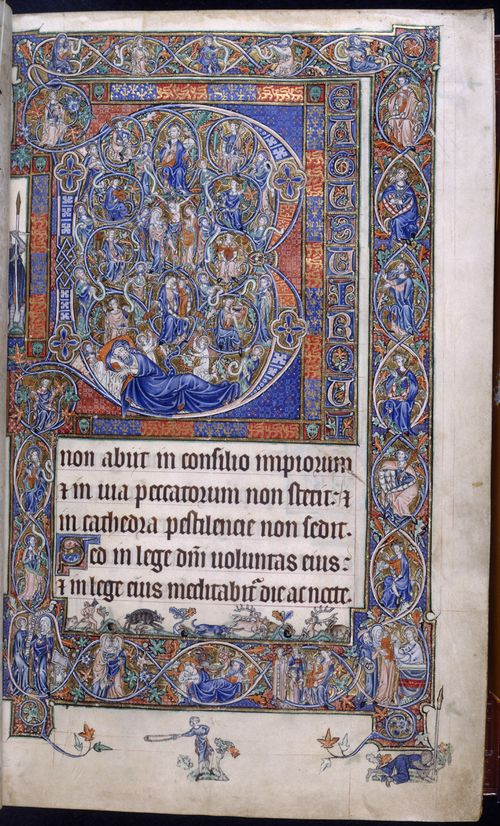
The Tree of Jesse Beatus initial in the Gorleston Psalter, c. 1310, bordered by the royal arms of England and France (fol. 8r)

Beatus vir (Ecclesiastical Latin: [beˈatus ˈvir]; "Blessed is the man ...") (Note: Hebrew: אשרי האיש (’ašrê hā-’îš). Other translations use "happy" etc., and very modern ones sometimes controversially use "person" as a gender-neutral substitution, although the Latin, Greek, and Hebrew terms are all decisively masculine.) are the first words in the Latin Vulgate Bible of both Psalm 1 and Psalm 112 (in the general modern numbering; it is Psalm 111 in the Greek Septuagint and the Vulgate (Note: Throughout this article, the psalm numbering and links follow the general modern numbering. The Septuagint and Vulgate numbering is stated in the respective articles)). In each case, the words are used to refer to frequent and significant uses of these psalms in art, although the two psalms are prominent in different fields, art in the case of Psalm 1 and music in the case of Psalm 112. In psalter manuscripts, the initial letter B of Beatus is often rendered prominently as a Beatus initial.

Altogether the phrase occurs 14 times in the Vulgate text, eight times in the Book of Psalms, and four times in the rest of the Old Testament, but no uses in the New Testament.

== Psalm 1 in art ==
Psalm 1 naturally begins the text of the Book of Psalms. In illuminated manuscript psalters this start was traditionally marked by a large Beatus initial for the B of Beatus, and the two opening words are often much larger than the rest of the text. Between them these often take up a whole page. Beatus initials have been significant in the development of manuscript painting, as the location of several developments in the use of initials as the focus of painting. As the "initial par excellence it stimulated the ornamentalizing impulse of the medieval artist to ever-increasing heights of fantasy". The 10th-century Anglo-Saxon Ramsey Psalter initial illustrated here is the first known to use the "lion mask" on the bar of the "B".

In psalters of the Early and High Middle Ages there were often similarly large initials at the start of Psalm 52 ("Q" for "Quid gloriaris") and Psalm 102 ("D" for "Domine"), (Note: Incipit: "Domine exaudi orationem meam et clamor meus ad te veniat …") marking traditional groupings of the psalms. Other divisions of text produced different groupings, of eight or ten groups, but all had a group beginning at Psalm 1. Often these initials were the only major illumination in the manuscript, as in the Stowe Psalter. In bibles the first letter of each book was also enlarged and illuminated in grand manuscripts, producing more beatus initials.

King David was regarded as the author of the psalms, and many initials included depictions of him, so serving also as author portraits; the rounded compartments of the letter "B" often allowed two scenes to be shown. Greatly enlarged beatus initials go back as least as far as the Corbie Psalter, made at Corbie Abbey soon after 800. There were probably Insular examples but none have survived. The Corbie example contains two large figures within a letter shape filled with geometric motifs, mostly interlace, but for some centuries after it is ornament that dominates, with large plant scrolls taking over from geometric ornament. Figures returned during the 11th century. In some elaborate later initials more scenes were shown, allowing typological comparisons between the Old and New Testaments. In some psalters after about 1200, especially English ones including both the Gorleston Psalter (illustrated) and Windmill Psalter, very large "B"s allowed room for a Tree of Jesse, which included David.

=== Incipit of Psalm 1 ===
==== Vulgate ====
1. Beatus vir qui non abiit in consilio impiorum, et in via peccatorum non stetit, et in cathedra pestilentiae non sedit;
2. sed in lege Domini voluntas ejus, et in lege ejus meditabitur die ac nocte.

==== King James Version ====
1. Blessed is the man that walketh not in the counsel of the ungodly, nor standeth in the way of sinners, nor sitteth in the seat of the scornful.
2. But his delight is in the law of the Lord; and in his law doth he meditate day and night.

== Psalm 112 in music ==
Psalm 112 has been included in various places in Western Christian liturgy, especially in the context of vespers, and has been popular for musical settings, which are generally known by their opening words, Beatus vir. A database of psalm settings by Italian composers of the 17th and 18th centuries lists 81 settings of Psalm 112.

Today probably the best known is Claudio Monteverdi's setting of 1640, SV 268, from his Selva morale e spirituale, also known as the Vespers of 1640. This piece is still often performed by itself, and has been described as "one of the most attractive and inspired settings of the Selva morale and one of the few sacred works of Monteverdi’s later years that has become widely known."

Other examples include:

- Antonio Vivaldi (1678–1741), Beatus vir (RV597), the better known of his three settings, one now lost; RV598 is the other.
- Mozart's Vesperae de Dominica (K. 321), third movement, also Vesperae solennes de confessore (K. 339).
- Beatus vir, ZWV 75, 76, and 77, by Jan Dismas Zelenka,
- Beatus vir, MH 410, MH 398, by Michael Haydn,
- Beatus vir, Seibel 26, 27, and 28 by Johann David Heinichen
- Beatus Vir, Opus 38, by Henryk Górecki
- Beatus Vir by Niccolo Jommelli
- Beatus Vir, Op. 19: IV Salmi concerti by Isabella Leonarda
- Beatus Vir, by François Giroust (1777)
- Beatus Vir, JC-104 by Giovanni Battista Sammartini

Other settings include those by Giammateo Asola, Marc-Antoine Charpentier, 6 settings 1670 - 1690 (H.175, H.154, H.199, H.208, H.221, H.224), Michel-Richard Delalande, Charles-Hubert Gervais and Johann Adolf Hasse.

=== Incipit of Psalm 112 ===
==== Vulgate ====
1. Alleluja, reversionis Aggaei et Zachariae. Beatus vir qui timet Dominum: in mandatis ejus volet nimis.
2. Potens in terra erit semen ejus; generatio rectorum benedicetur.

==== King James Version ====
1. Praise ye the Lord. Blessed is the man that feareth the Lord, that delighteth greatly in his commandments.
2. His seed shall be mighty upon earth: the generation of the upright shall be blessed.

=== Settings of other psalms ===
Psalm 1 has been given many settings, though none are now well-known. Beatus Vir (Gorecki), Opus 38, subtitled Psalm for baritone, large mixed chorus and grand orchestra, is a setting of texts from various psalms by Henryk Górecki from 1979, commissioned by Pope John Paul II. Neither Psalm 1 nor 112 are used, and the title comes from part of Psalm 33.

Pieces called Beatus vir are catalogued by Marc-Antoine Charpentier (6 settings: H.175, H.154, H.199, H.208, H.221, H.224 (Ps. 112), 376 (different text), Stanislao Mattei, Félicien David and many others.

Verses from Psalms 1-3 (compiled together under the title 'Blessed is the man') form part of the Orthodox All-Night Vigil, and as such settings of these verses are found in settings of the service, including those by Pyotr Ilyich Tchaikovsky and Sergei Rachmaninov.

Beatus vir
3rd movement
Mozart – vesperae de dominica. 3rd. movement
(4:24 minutes, 5 MB)

== See also ==
- Latin Psalters
- Vulgate

== Sources ==
- Calkins, Robert G. Illuminated Books of the Middle Ages. 1983, Cornell University Press, ISBN 0500233756
- Otto Pächt, Book Illumination in the Middle Ages (trans fr German), 1986, Harvey Miller Publishers, London, ISBN 0199210608
