= Latin Psalters =

Translations of the Book of Psalms into Latin

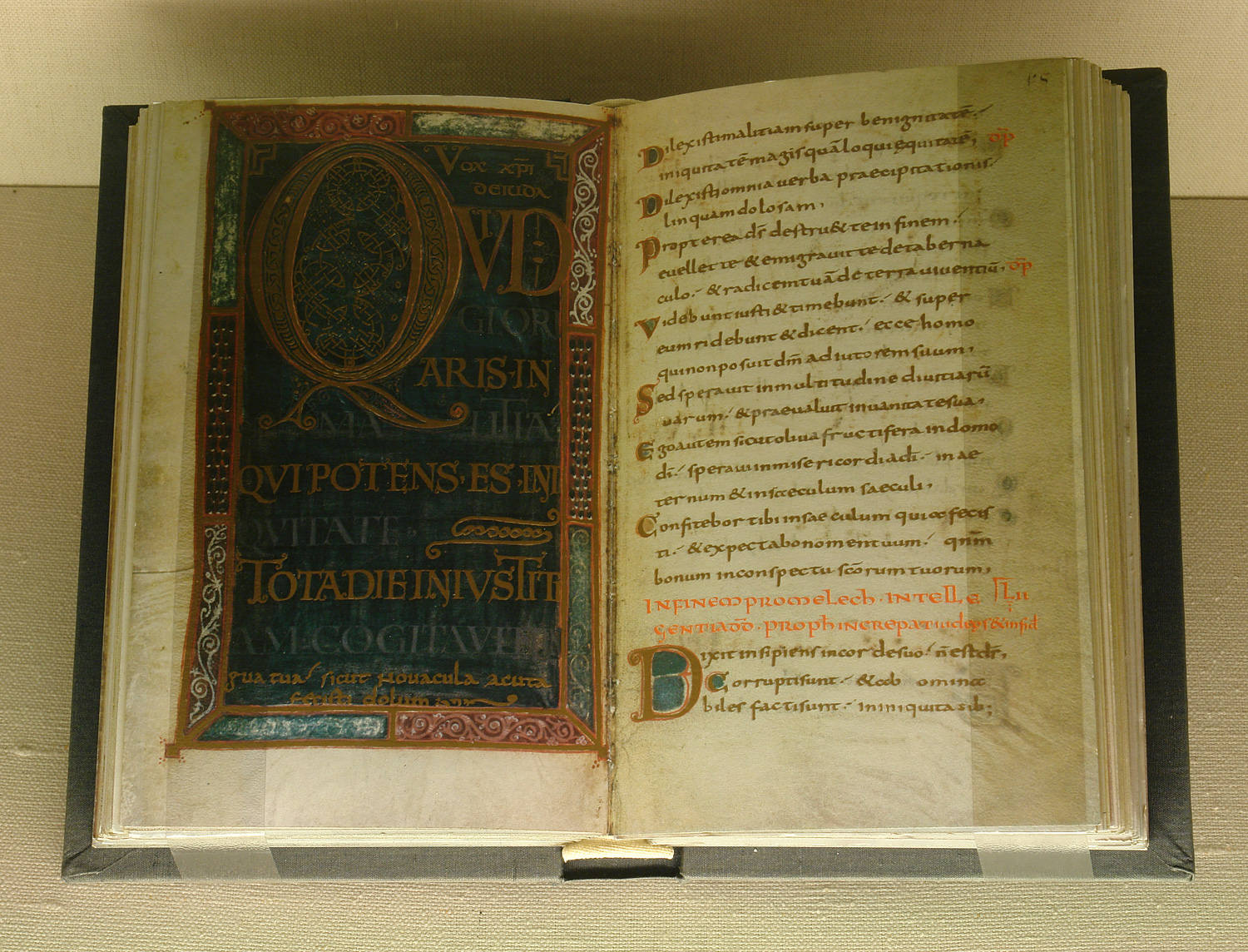
The Golden psalter open to Psalm 51(52), "Quid gloriaris in malitia, qui potens es in iniquitate?"

There exist a number of translations of the Book of Psalms into the Latin language. They are a resource used in the Liturgy of the Hours and other forms of the canonical hours in the Latin liturgical rites of the Catholic Church.

These translations are typically placed in a separate volume or a section of the breviary called the psalter, in which the psalms are arranged to be prayed at the canonical hours of the day. In the Middle Ages, psalters were often lavish illuminated manuscripts, and in the Romanesque and early Gothic period were the type of book most often chosen to be richly illuminated.

== Versions ==
The Latin Church has a number of more or less different full translations of the psalms into Latin. Three of these translations, the Romana, Gallicana, and juxta Hebraicum, have been traditionally ascribed to Jerome, the author of most of the Latin Vulgate; however, the Romana was not produced by Jerome. Two other translations, the Pian and Nova Vulgata versions, were made in the 20th century.

=== Versio Vetus Latina ===
Also called the Psalterium Vetus, the psalter of the Vetus Latina Bible. Quotations from the Psalms in Latin authors show that a number of related but distinct Old Latin recensions were circulating in the mid-4th century. These had by then substantially replaced the older Latin 'Cyprianic Psalter', a recension found in the works of Cyprian of Carthage that only survived in the 4th-century writings of the Donatists; and are all thought to be revisions of a lost common early 3rd-century version.

A 12th-century Latin bible from Monte Cassino (Ms. Cas. 557) preserves, alongside the Roman, Gallican and Iuxta Hebraeos psalters, a fourth complete version of the psalms extensively corrected with reference to the columns of the Hexapla Greek, possibly using a columnar transcription of the Hexapla psalter similar to that surviving in Milan. The underlying Latin text for this manuscript is believed to correspond with an early 3rd-century 'Cyprianic Psalter'.

=== Versio Ambrosiana ===
This is the version used in the Ambrosian rite for use in Milan.

=== Versio Mozarabica ===
This is the version used in the Mozarabic rite for use in Toledo.

=== Versio Romana ===
The Roman Psalter, called also the Versio Romana or Psalterium Romanum, was traditionally identified with Jerome's first revision of the psalms completed in 384; which was thought to have been made from the Versio Vetus Latina, with cursory corrections to bring it more in line with the psalms in the common Greek text of the Septuagint. More recent scholarship rejects this theory. The Roman Psalter is indeed one of five known revised versions of the mid-4th century Old Latin Psalter; but, compared with the four others the revisions in the Roman Psalter are in clumsy Latin and signally fail to follow Jerome's known translational principles, especially in failing to correct harmonised readings. Nevertheless, it is clear from Jerome's correspondence (especially in the long and detailed Epistle 106) that he was familiar with this psalter text, albeit without ever admitting any responsibility for it; and consequently it is assumed that the surviving Versio Romana represents the minimally revised Roman text as Jerome had found it.

The Roman version is retained in the Roman Missal and is found in the writings of Pope Gregory the Great, but for the Divine Office, it was, from the 9th century onwards, replaced throughout most of the west by Jerome's so-called "Gallican" version. It lived on in England where it continued to be used until the Norman Conquest and in Saint Peter's Basilica in Rome and fragments of it were used in the Offices at St. Mark's Cathedral in Venice from at least 1609 until 1807.

=== Versio Gallicana ===
The Versio Gallicana or Psalterium Gallicanum, also known as the Gallican Psalter (so called because it became spread in Gaul from the 9th century onward) has traditionally been considered Jerome's second Latin translation of the Psalms, which he made from the Greek of the Hexapla between 386 and 389. This became the psalter of the Sixto-Clementine Vulgate bible.

This most influential psalter has a distinctive style which is attributable to its origins as a translation of the Septuagint. Following the Septuagint, it eschews anthropomorphisms. For instance, the term rock is applied to God numerous times in the Hebrew Psalter, but the Latin term petra does not occur as an epithet for God in the gallicana. Instead more abstract words like refugium, "refuge"; locus munitus, "place of strength"; or adiutor, "helper" are used.

=== Versio juxta Hebraicum ===
The versio juxta Hebraicum or versio iuxta Hebraeos was the last made by Jerome. It is often informally called the "Hebrew Psalter" despite being written in Latin. Rather than just revise the Gallicana, he translated these psalms anew from the Hebrew, using pre-Masoretic manuscripts ca. 392. This psalter was present in the Bibles until Alcuin's reforms linked to the Carolingian liturgical reform: Alcuin replaced the versio juxta Hebraicum by a version of the psalter used in Gaul at the time. The latter became known as the Gallican psalter (see the section above), and it superseded the versio juxta Hebraicum. The versio juxta Hebraicum was kept in Spanish manuscripts of the Vulgate long after the Gallican psalter had supplanted it elsewhere. The versio juxta Hebraicum was never used in the liturgy.

=== Versio Piana ===
Under Pius XII, a new Latin translation of the psalms, known as Versio Piana, Psalterium Vaticanum or Novum Psalterium, was published by the Pontifical Biblical Institute. This version is sometimes called the Bea psalter after its author, Augustin Bea. (Note: Augustin Bea's book Il nuovo Salterio Latino. Chiarimenti sull'origine e lo spirito della traduzione, Rome, 1946 (published in English in The Catholic Biblical Quarterly, Vol. 8, No. 1 (January, 1946), pp. 4–35) explains in details the criteria and the reasons for his version.) In 1945, its use was officially permitted by the pope through the motu proprio In cotidianis precibus, but not required.

=== Versio Nova Vulgata ===
In 1969, a new psalter was published which translated the Masoretic Text while keeping much of the poetry and style of the Gallican psalter. The 1969 psalter deviates from the previous versions in that it follows the Masoretic numbering of the psalms, rather than the Septuagint enumeration. It is the psalter used in the edition of the Roman Office published in 1986.

== Comparison ==
Below is a comparison of Jerome's two versions of the first three verses of the psalm Venite exsultemus (psalm 94 (95)) with the Vetus Latina, Ambrosiana, Mozarabica, Romana, Gallicana, and Hebraicum versions, as well as the two 20th-century versions (Piana and Nova Vulgata), which illustrates some of the distinctions noted above:

Versio Vetus Latina	Versio Ambrosiana	Versio Mozarabica	Versio Romana	Versio Gallicana	Versio juxta Hebraicum	Versio Piana	Versio Nova Vulgata
Psalmus 94	Psalmus 94	Psalmus 94	Psalmus 94	Psalmus 94	Psalmus 94	Psalmus 94	Psalmus 94 (95)
Venite, exultemus in Domino: jubilemus Deo salutari nostro.	Venite, exultemus Domino: jubilemus Deo salutari nostro.	Venite, exultemus in domino, iubilemus deo saluatori nostro.	Venite, exsultemus Domino; iubilemus Deo salutari nostro.	Venite, exsultemus Domino; jubilemus Deo salutari nostro;	Venite laudemus Dominum iubilemus petrae Iesu nostro	Venite, exsultemus Domino, Acclamemus Petrae salutis nostrae:	Venite, exsultemus Domino; iubilemus Deo salutari nostro.
Præveniamus vultum ejus in confessionem: et in psalmis jubilemus ei.	Præveniamus faciem ejus in confessione: et in psalmis jubilemus illi.	Preoccupemus faciem eius in confessione, et in psalmis iubilemus ei.	Præoccupemus faciem eius in confessione, et in psalmis iubilemus ei.	præoccupemus faciem ejus in confessione, et in psalmis jubilemus ei:	praeoccupemus vultum eius in actione gratiarum in canticis iubilemus ei	Accedamus in conspectum eius cum laudibus, Cum canticis exsultemus ei.	Praeoccupemus faciem eius in confessione et in psalmis iubilemus ei.
Quia Deus magnus est, et rex magnus super omnes deos: quia non repelet Dominus populum suum.	Quoniam Deus magnus Dominus: et Rex magnus super omnes deos.	Quoniam deus magnus dominus, rex magnus super omnem terram.	Quoniam Deus magnus Dominus, et rex magnus super omnes deos.	quoniam Deus magnus Dominus, et rex magnus super omnes deos.	quoniam fortis et magnus Dominus et rex magnus super omnes deos	Nam Deus magnus est Dominus, Et Rex magnus super omnes deos.	Quoniam Deus magnus Dominus, et rex magnus super omnes deos.

== Enumeration ==
The enumeration of the psalms differs in the Nova Vulgata from that used in the earlier versions. The earlier versions take their enumeration from the Greek Septuagint. The Versio Nova Vulgata takes its enumeration from the Hebrew Masoretic Text.

Old enumeration used by the Vulgate and other early versions; taken from the Septuagint	New enumeration used by the Versio Nova Vulgata and most modern English bibles; taken from the Masoretic Text
1-8
9	9–10
10–112	11–113
113	114–115
114–115	116
116–145	117–146
146–147	147
148-150

- Psalms 9 and 10 in the Nova Vulgata are together as Psalm 9 in the older versions
- Psalms 114 and 115 in the Nova Vulgata are Psalm 113 in the older versions
- Psalms 114 and 115 in the older versions appear as Psalm 116 in the Nova Vulgata
- Psalms 146 and 147 in the older versions form Psalm 147 in the Nova Vulgata
- Psalms 10–112 and 116–145 (132 out of the 150) in the older versions are numbered lower by one than the same psalm in the Nova Vulgata.
- Psalms 1–8 and 148–150, 11 psalms in total, are numbered the same in both the old versions and the new one.

== Divisions ==
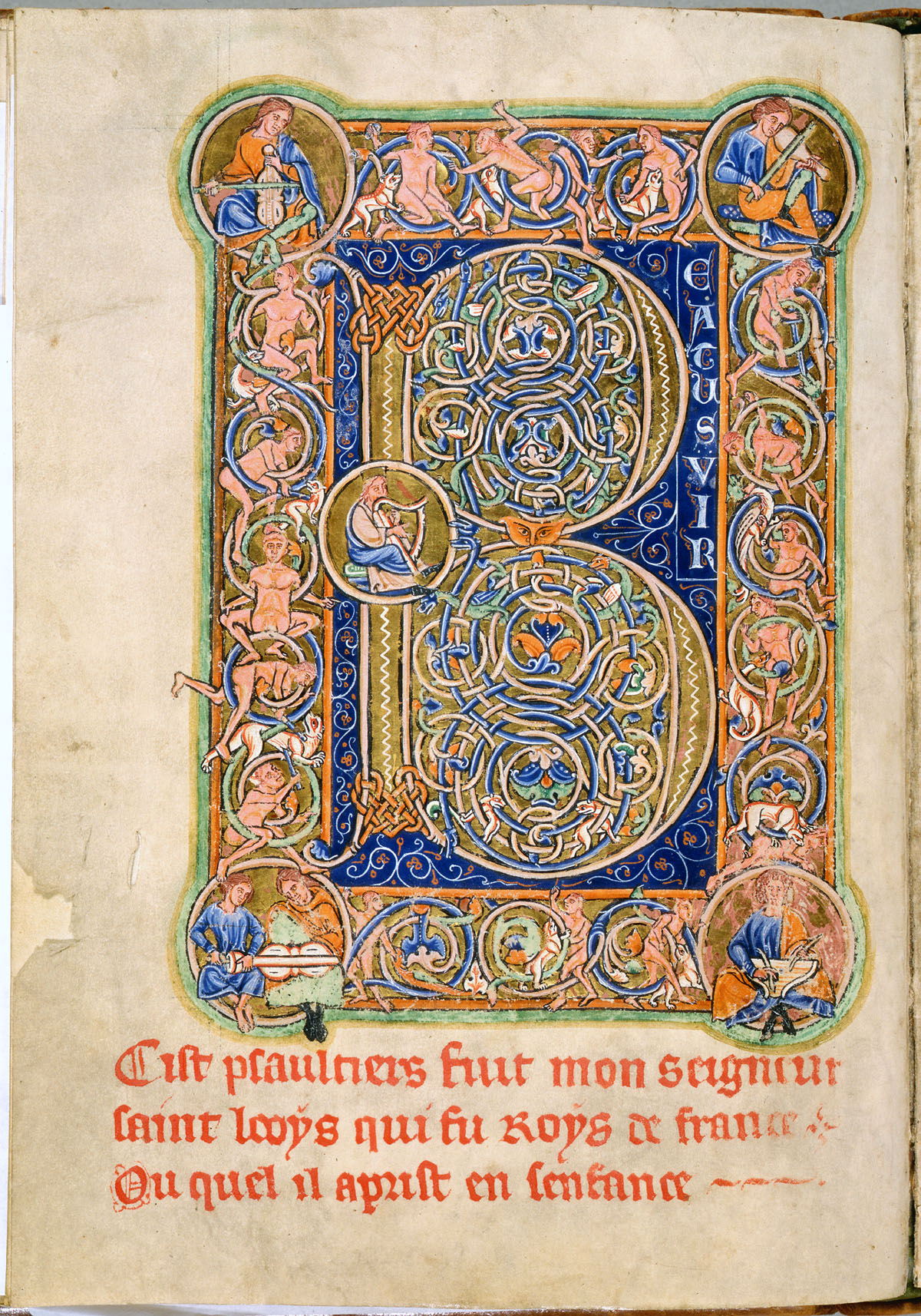
"Beatus initial" for the start of Psalm 1 "Beatus vir", from the Leiden St Louis Psalter; first of the early tripartite divisions of the psalms

Apart from the schemata described below, it was customary in medieval psalters to divide the text of the psalms in numerical sequence into sections or divisions, the start of which were typically marked by a much larger and more decorated initial letter than for the other psalms. The "B" of Psalm 1, Beatus Vir, usually was the most enlarged and decorated, and often those two words occupied a full page, the rounded shape of the letter being very suitable for decoration. These are often referred to as "Beatus initials". In early medieval psalters a three-fold division with decorated letters at Psalms 1, 51, 101 was typical, but by the Gothic period French psalters were often divided into eight sections, and English ones into ten, at Psalms 1, 26, 38, 51, 52, 68, 80, 97, 101 and 109.

== Schemata ==
A scheme (Latin schema, plural schemata) is an arrangement of all or most of the psalms for distribution to the various canonical hours. In addition to the psalms proper, these schemata typically include psalm-like canticles from other books of the Bible. Historically, these schemata have distributed the entire 150 psalms with added canticles over a period of one week, although the 1971 Liturgy of the Hours omits a few psalms and some verses and distributes the remainder over a 4-week cycle. Some of the more important schemes are detailed below.

In addition to the rotating schema, the order of service has ordinary texts that are fixed. These include the Invitatory, normally psalm 94(95), and the canticles Benedictus Dominus, Magnificat, and Nunc dimittis.

=== Schema of Pope Pius V ===
As commissioned by the Council of Trent, St. Pius V published a reform of the Roman Breviary in 1568 for use by the churches of the Roman rite. The scheme used in this breviary (Note: Available here.) differs in some details from the Scheme of St. Benedict, (Note: Available here.) but follows its overall pattern. Some obvious differences are that Sunday had three nocturns, while the other days had but one; Lauds and the daytime hours had less variation in the Psalmody; and Compline added Psalm 30. In addition, while St. Benedict made heavy use of "divided" Psalms, the Roman rite divided only Psalm 118.

This scheme was used by many religious orders as well, such as the Dominicans (of which Pope Pius V was a member).

=== Schema of Pope Pius X ===
In 1911, Pope Pius X reformed the Roman Breviary, re-arranging the psalms into a new scheme (Note: Available here.) so that there was less repetition and so that each day of the week had approximately the same amount of psalm-chanting.

Psalm 94 (the Invitiatory) was recited every day at the beginning of Matins. With Lauds, there are two schemes. Lauds I were celebrated on all Sundays and ferias, except from Septuagesima until Palm Sunday inclusive, and on feasts celebrated at any time of the year. Lauds II, having a more penitential character, were used on the Sundays and ferias of Advent until the vigil of Christmas and from Septuagesima until Monday of Holy Week inclusive. They were also used on vigils of the second and third class outside of Paschaltide. When Lauds II were said, the omitted psalm was said as a fourth psalm at Prime, in order to include all 150 psalms each week during penitential seasons; on Sundays with Lauds II, the scheme became 92, 99, 118i, and 118ii. On feasts which used the Sunday psalms, 53, 118i, and 118ii were said at Prime. On Sundays after Epiphany and Pentecost, the Athanasian Creed was said fourth at Prime; it was omitted if a commemoration of a Double feast or of an octave occurred.

=== Schema of Pope Paul VI ===
In 1971 with the release of a new edition of the Divine Office under Pope Paul VI, the Liturgia Horarum, a new schema (Note: Available here.) was introduced which distributed 147 of the 150 psalms across a four-week cycle.

== See also ==
- Vulgate
- Sixto-Clementine Vulgate
- Septuagint
- Vetus Latina
- Beatus vir
