= Thomas Moule =

English antiquarian

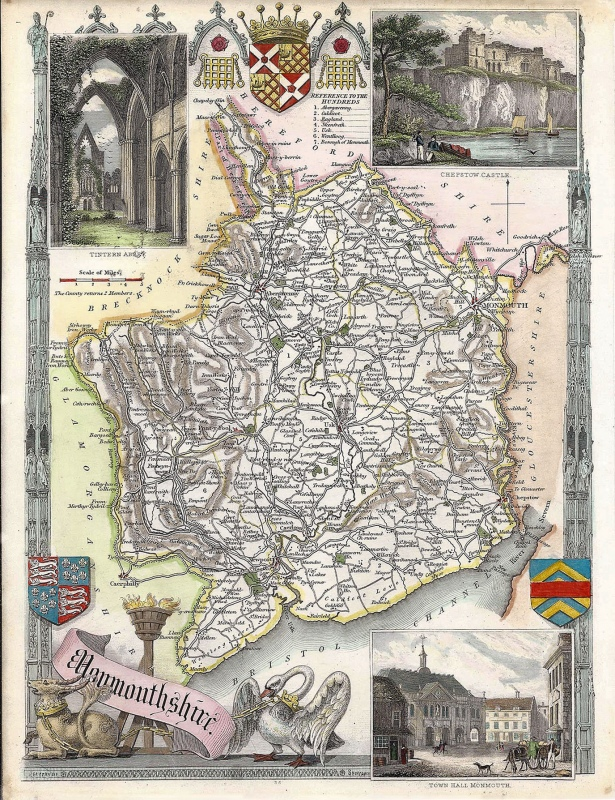
Moule's map of the hundreds of Monmouthshire, c. 1831

Thomas Moule (14 January 1784 – January 1851) was an English antiquarian, writer on heraldry, and one of Victorian England's most influential map-makers. He is best known for his popular and highly decorated county maps of England, steel-engraved and first published separately between 1830 and 1832.

Moule was born in Marylebone, London. He sold books in Duke Street, Grosvenor Square, from 1816 to 1822. Later, he became an inspector of 'blind' (illegibly addressed) letters at the General Post Office. He died at his residence in St. James's Palace, to which he was entitled as Chamber-keeper in the Lord Chamberlain's Department.

== Works ==
- Bibliotheca Heraldica Magnae Britanniae. Published by the author. 1822.
- Neale, John Preston; Le Keux, John; Moule, Thomas (1824). Views of the most interesting collegiate and parochial churches in Great Britain. London: Longman, Rees, Orme, Brown, Green. with John Preston Neale and John Le Keux
- Antiquities in Westminster Abbey. London: G. P. Harding. 1825.
- Great Britain Illustrated: A Series of Original Views. London: C. Tilt. 1830.with William Westall
- The landscape album, or, Great Britain Illustrated in a series of sixty views. Vol. 1. London: Charles Tilt. 1832. hdl:2027/nyp.33433075904643. with William Westall
- The landscape album, or, Great Britain Illustrated in a series of sixty views. Vol. 2. London: Charles Tilt. 1832. hdl:2027/nyp.33433075904650. with William Westall
- An Essay on the Roman Villas of the Augustan Age. London: Longman, Rees, Orme, Brown, Green, and Longman. 1833.
- The English Counties Delineated. Vol. 1. London: George Virtue. 1837.
- The English Counties Delineated. Vol. 2. London: George Virtue. 1837.
- The Heraldry of Fish. London. 1842.
- Winkles's architectural and picturesque illustrations of the cathedral churches of England and Wales. London: W. Kent. 1860.

== Sources ==
- Cooper, Thompson (1894). "Moule, Thomas" . In Lee, Sidney (ed.). Dictionary of National Biography. Vol. 39. London: Smith, Elder & Co.
