= Shirburn Castle =

Medieval castle in England

Coordinates: 51.65757°N 0.99380°W

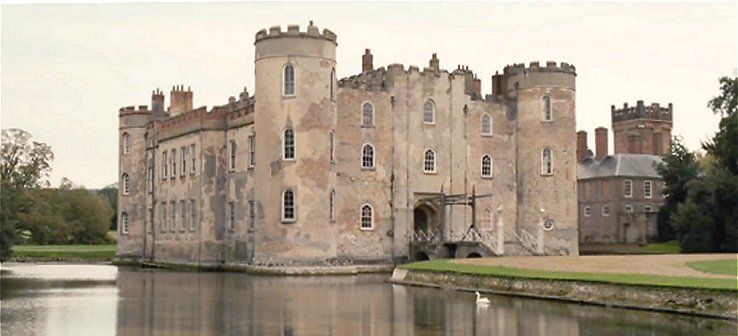
Shirburn Castle

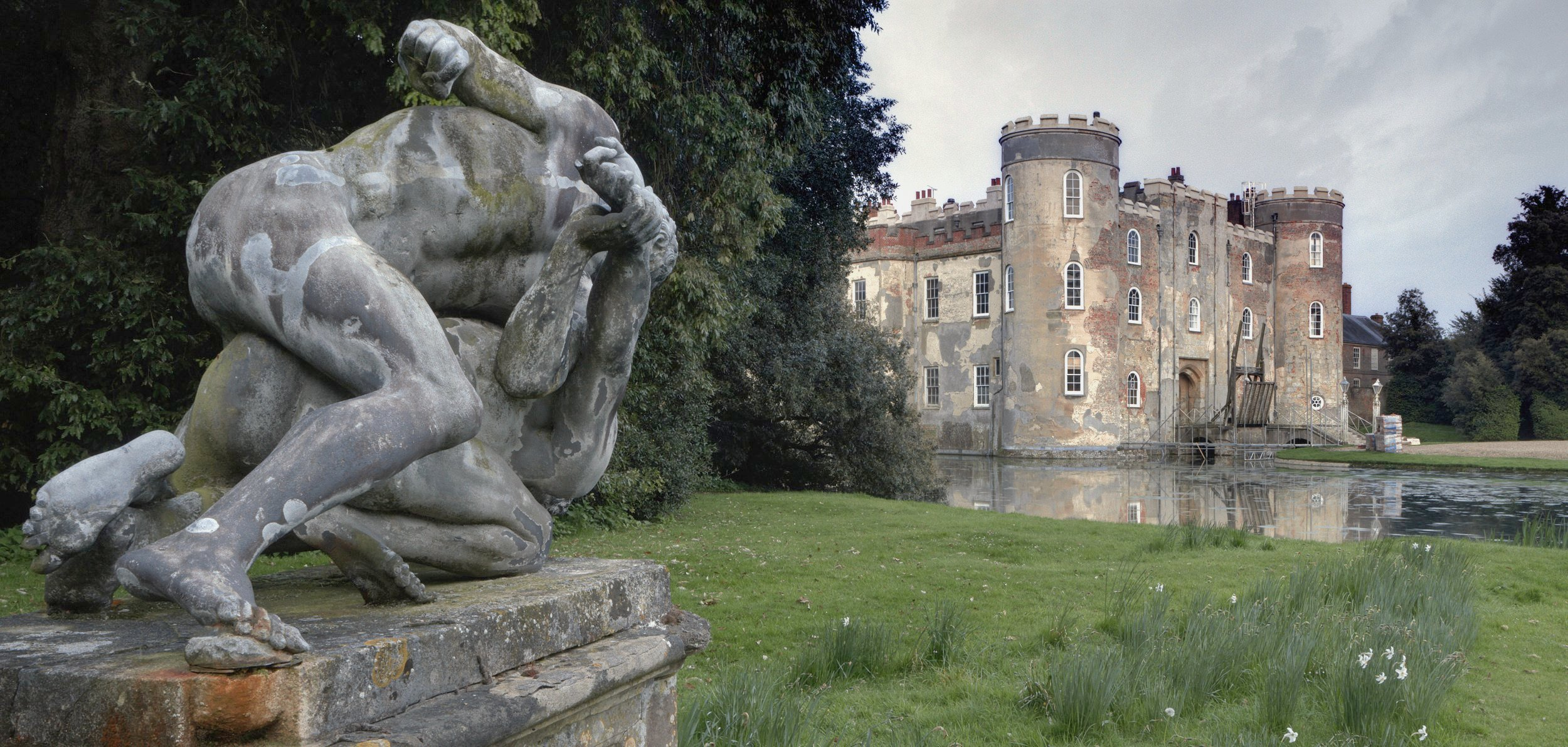
Shirburn Castle - more detailed view of the frontage from the surrounding gardens

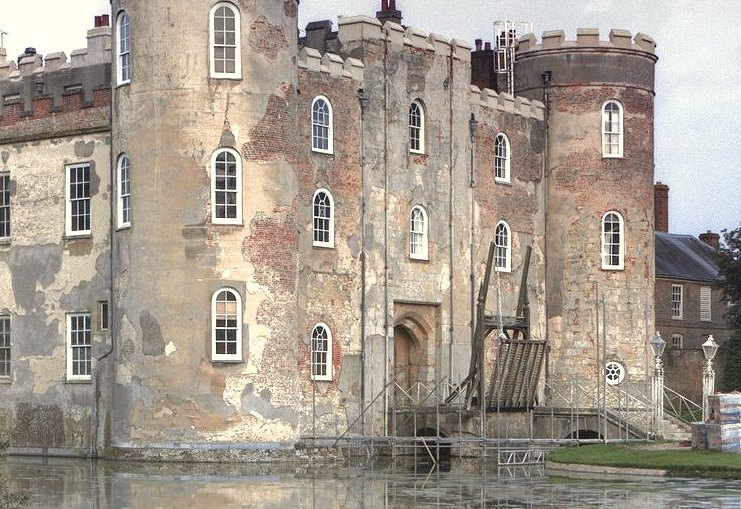
Detail of the west front in 2014, showing construction materials revealed by loss of the external render, and the early nineteenth century drawbridge in raised position

Shirburn Castle is a Grade I listed, moated castle located at the village of Shirburn, near Watlington, Oxfordshire. Originally constructed in the fourteenth century, it was renovated and remodelled in the Georgian era by Thomas Parker, the first Earl of Macclesfield who made it his family seat, and altered further in the early nineteenth century. The Earls of Macclesfield remained in residence until 2004, and the castle is still (2022) owned by the Macclesfield family company. It formerly contained an important, early eighteenth century library which, along with valuable paintings, sculptures, and other artifacts including furniture, remained in the ownership of the 9th Earl and were largely dispersed at auction following his departure from the property; notable among these items were George Stubbs's 1768 painting "Brood Mares and Foals", a record setter for the artist at auction in 2010, the Macclesfield Psalter, numerous rare and valuable books, and personal correspondence of Sir Isaac Newton. Still privately owned, the castle is not open to the public although its exterior and some portions of the interior have been publicly visible on account of its use in a number of film and television productions.

== Description and history ==
=== Eleventh to thirteenth centuries ===
The land on which Shirburn resides was part owned by the Norman nobleman Robert D'Oyly who accompanied William the Conqueror on his conquest of England in 1066. Various nineteenth century sources, stemming in the main from a short "History of Shirburn Castle" compiled by Lady Macclesfield in 1887, state that D'Oyly constructed a castle there, which was described as having been surrendered to Empress Matilda (or Maud) in 1141 as part of a ransom negotiation. Later one Warin(e) de Lisle (or de Insula), apparently possessed the estate; this Warin was executed at York in 1322 for taking part in an insurrection. Subsequently, his widow was pardoned and her late husband's lands restored; whether these included a Norman castle at Shirburn, or whether such a structure even existed in that form, has not been verified by subsequent researchers and may in fact simply reflect a desire of the then occupants to claim a more ancient origin for the castle than was actually the case. The relevant chapter of the Victoria County History notes only the previous existence of a manor (West Shirburn, which together with its counterpart at East Shirburn formed the twin manors of the district), which belonged in the 13th century to Robert de Burghfield, "likely to have been on the site" of the present castle. A supposed account of a pre-1300 visit to a "castle" at Shirburn by Brunetto Latini, the tutor of Dante, also quoted in nineteenth century sources, was revealed as a forgery of a book published in 1948 (see relevant section of the Victoria County History, footnote 18).

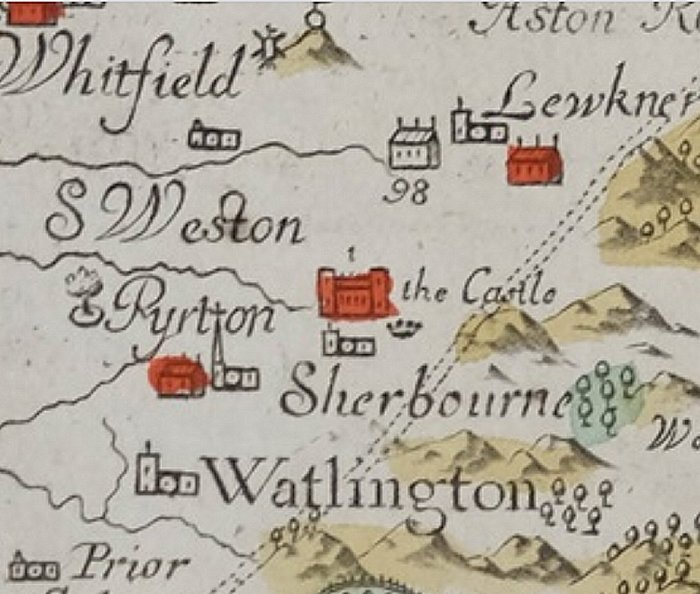
Shirburn ("Sherbourne") Castle on Robert Plot's 1677 "Map of Oxfordshire"

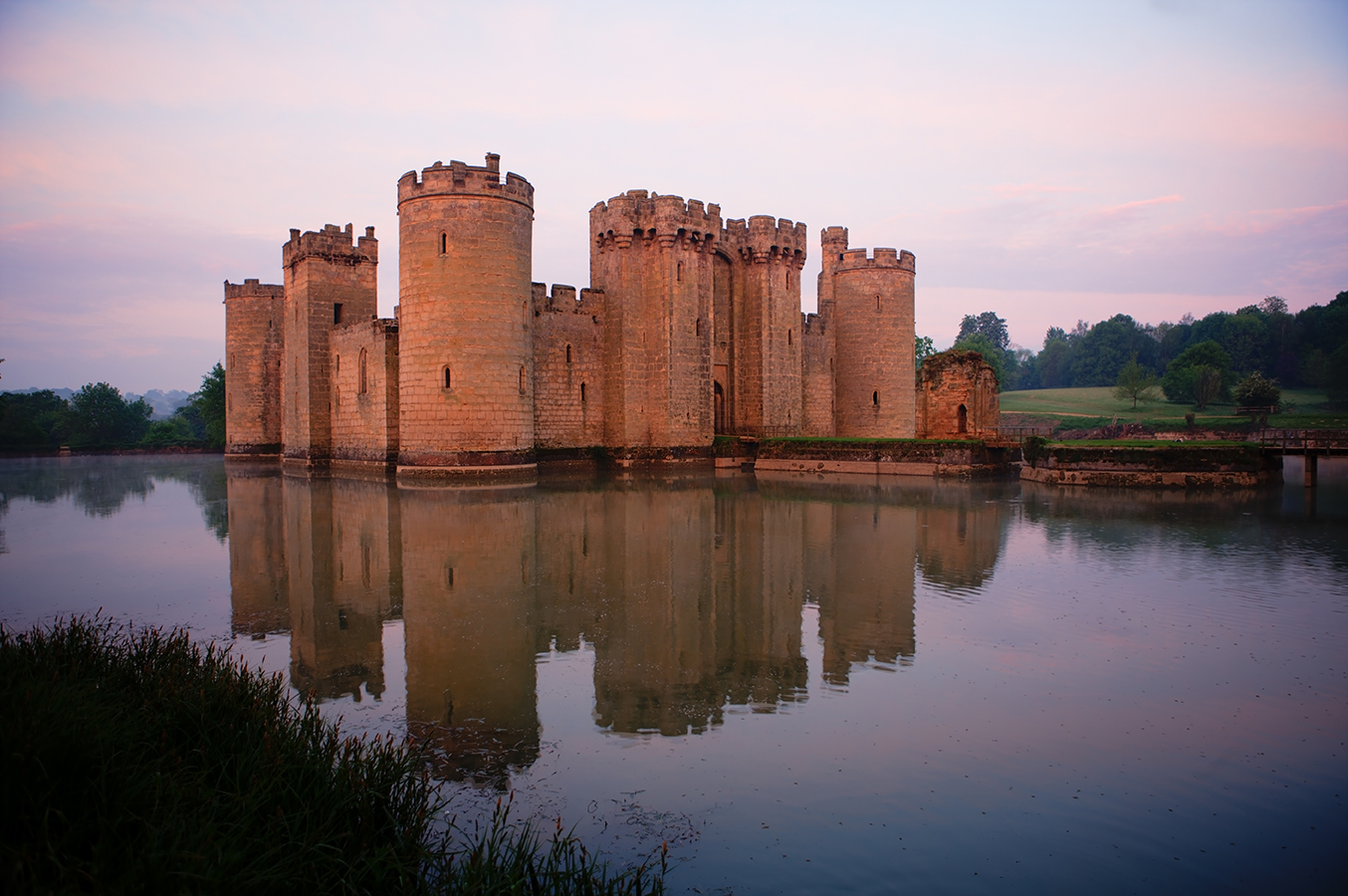
Bodiam Castle in East Sussex, showing a possible analogue for the appearance of some aspects of Shirburn (such as windows and other openings) prior to the latter's 18th-century remodelling

=== 1377-1716 (de Lisle/Quatremain/Fowler/Chamberlain/Gage era) ===
A "licence to crenellate" (generally interpreted as permission to build) the present castle was granted to the earlier Warin's grandson, Warin de Lisle in 1377, with actual construction taking place around 1378. The present, still moated, two-to-three storey building has a quadrangular form with four rounded corner towers. Rendered on the exterior (although the plaster has now disappeared in places), it has been stated as being the earliest brick building in Oxfordshire, however this appears to be based on a misconception: Emery, cited below, believes that the original construction was probably built entirely in limestone, with the brick "casing" added only when the castle was remodelled in 1720 in the Georgian style. (Note: In the 2014 photographs of the tower, several accompanying this article, the partial decay and loss of the exterior render appears to show that the lower sections of much of the west front and its right-hand tower are built from stone, not brick, the render then (when originally applied) possibly acting as a concealment to the otherwise mismatched materials, as well as providing a consistent, faux stone appearance. According to Emery, 2006: "The [present] castle is a mixture of dressed stone, rubble masonry, and brickwork... Stripped to its basics, the castle was probably built entirely in limestone with most of the brick casing added in the eighteenth century while the rubble on the western towers is also facing material only.") Emery writes:

It is often claimed that Shirburn is the first brick-built castle in England and the earliest use of this material in Oxfordshire ... externally, the brick casing of the house is eighteenth century so that Shirburn can be excluded from the incunabula [printed references] of this material in the Thames valley.

Emery also compares and contrasts de Lisle's castle at Shirburn with that constructed a few years later by Sir Edward Dalyngrigge at Bodiam in Sussex, noting similarities in original architectural features but also that Shirburn "seems to have had less of a martial air than the castle at Bodiam", in particular that the "formidable twin-towered gate-house" at Bodiam presents a stronger front than its equivalent at Shirburn.

After de Lisle's death in 1382, the castle passed to his daughter, who married Lord Berkeley, and then to her daughter who married Richard Beauchamp, Earl of Warwick, whose principal residence was Warwick Castle. Later it was owned or occupied by successive families including the Talbots, Quartremayes (Quatremains), and Fowlers and eventually sold to the Chamberlain family, commencing with Edward Chamberlain, whose mother took out a lease on the Shirburn estate from her brother in 1505 and who died there in 1543. The castle's next owner was Sir Leonard Chamberlain (or Chamberlayne), d.1561, who was also the Governor of Guernsey from 1553. An account survives from 1559 documenting something of the internal layout of the rooms at that time, specifically: "the wardrobe, the entry, the great chamber at the lower end of the hall, the inner chamber, 'the brusshynge howse', the hall and the chamber over the parlour, and an inner chamber there; there was also a cellar, buttery, chambers each for the butler, priest, horse-keeper, cook, and chamberlains, an additional chamber, a low parlour, a kitchen larder, boulting house, fish-house, garner, brew-house, and other outhouses". During the 1642–1651 English Civil War Shirburn was held by Richard Chamberlain for the King, but was surrendered to Sir Thomas Fairfax for the Parliamentarian cause in 1646, apparently without damage.

After the end of the Civil War, the castle remained in (or was returned to) the Chamberlain family. The last male of the line, John Chamberlain, died in 1651, leaving no sons but two co-heirs, his daughters Elizabeth, wife of John Neville, Lord [A]bergavenny, and Mary, who was married first to Sir Thomas Gage of Firle, Sussex, and later to Sir Henry Goring. Elizabeth and Lord Abergavenny (d. 1662) possessed the manorial rights there until Elizabeth's death (date not known); by 1682 both Elizabeth and Mary had died and the castle passed to Joseph Gage (1652–1700), Mary's fourth son by her first husband, Thomas Gage.

The appearance of the castle prior to its sale to Parker in 1716 is not known in detail from contemporary accounts or illustrations; it does appear (as a small icon) on Robert Plot's 1677 "Map of Oxfordshire" (relevant portion reproduced at right), similar to the castle of today, although whether this is intended to be a "stock" castle representation or an actual likeness is unclear. Emery, 2006, suggests that many features of its original external and likely internal appearance probably would have resembled its near-contemporary at Bodiam in Sussex; unlike Bodiam and many other castles of the era, Shirburn appears to have survived the Civil War relatively unscathed, the Victoria County History stating that it was never besieged but surrendered at the time after appropriate terms had been negotiated.

The Gage family outfitted the castle with an armoury in the late seventeenth–early eighteenth century, containing among other items suits of armour and weapons such as broadswords and "pistols and muskets all marked to Gage family ... typical of those used by a Household Militia force in the event of social unrest or more likely, at that time, of French invasion"; according to later illustrations, this armoury was retained as a feature of the post-1716 remodelling of the castle by Thomas Parker (refer next section), and can be glimpsed in the 1823 engraving by J. Skelton entitled "Ancient Entrance Hall of Shirburn Castle" (refer "external links").

The castle continued as the seat of that branch of the Gage family until 1714, when the eldest son, another Thomas Gage succeeded his wife Elizabeth's late father to the estate of High Meadow, a property in Gloucestershire, and associated "considerable fortune". He then decided to sell Shirburn.

=== 1716-c.1800 (Parker era, first part) ===
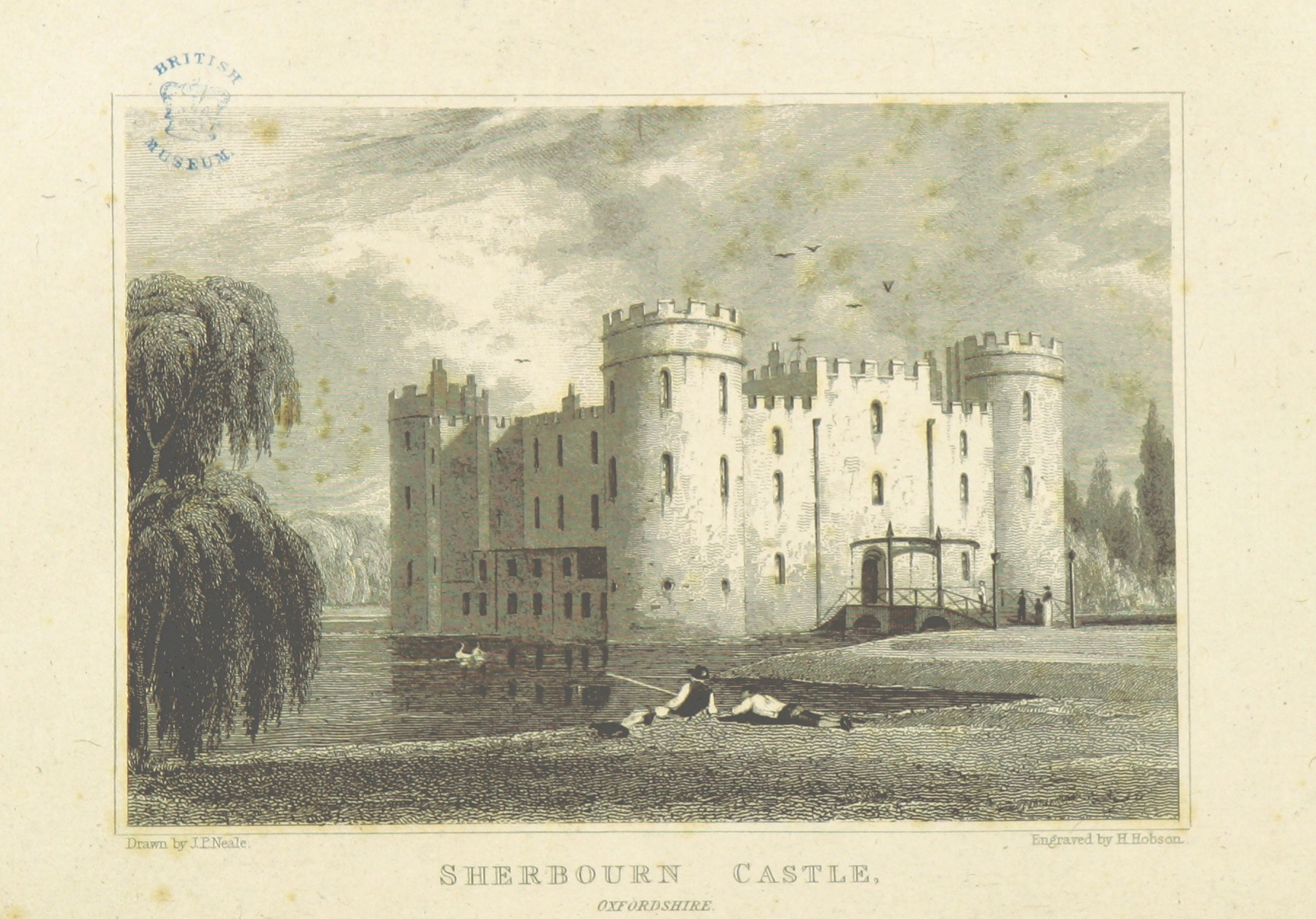
The Castle (as "Sherbourn Castle") as illustrated in John Neale's "Views of the Seats of Noblemen and Gentlemen in England, Wales, Scotland and Ireland. L.P", volume 3 (1818)

In 1716 the castle was acquired by Thomas Parker (1666–1732), Baron (later to be the first Earl) of Macclesfield and subsequently Lord Chancellor of England from 1718 to 1725, the purchase price (for Shirburn plus another property, Clare manor) being £25,696 8s. 5d. (more than £2 million in recent money); Mowl and Earnshaw, cited below, state that according to "a manuscript note made by Parker", the portion of the purchase price actually allocated to the castle exclusive of the grounds was £7,000, and that he also spent an additional £42,297 on the land needed for the park. From this date the castle became the seat of the Earls of Macclesfield (and/or their associated family company), until the present time. The then very wealthy, soon-to-be first Earl was responsible for extensive renovations to the castle (considered by most authors to be a substantial rebuild, see below), costing a further £5,000, (Note: The extent of, and reason for, the eighteenth-century remodelling (or rebuild) is unclear. In "English Castles - A Guide by Counties", Adrian Pettifer writes: "The castle [is] very much a sham in its features ...A Roundhead siege in 1646 had wrecked the castle ...The north and east sides have largely been rebuilt in any case, while an outer range has been added against the south wall and the rest has been pierced by late Georgian windows. The west front is least affected by the changes, though the gate tower has been absorbed by the heightened ranges on either side." On the other hand, other sources available imply that the castle was surrendered in the Civil War without damage, and there is no other documentary evidence of its condition or need for extensive repairs prior to its purchase by Thomas Parker in 1716. Parker, who was extremely wealthy, may simply have decided to "refashion" the castle to suit his taste; whether or not this makes the result a "sham" is left for the reader to decide.) and also started to accumulate the castle's extensive and important library, which survived intact for almost 300 years until its dispersal. Thomas Parker's son George, later to inherit the earldom and castle upon his father's death, set out for Italy on the "Grand Tour" in 1719 for a trip lasting almost three years, during which time he was commissioned by his father to acquire "important works" for the castle, the fruits of which included numerous plaster busts (casts of antique originals) plus at least 13 similar bronzes. Additions to the library were continued by the 3rd Earl, and by the latter's death in 1795 "the six collections for which the library is famous had been brought together, and 12,700 or so printed books and 260 manuscripts had been assembled ... [including] many first editions of early English books, including two Caxtons, and among its most valuable manuscript possessions is the unique Liber de Hida." (Note: The Liber de Hida (correctly "Hyda"), in full the Liber Monasterii de Hyda, is a unique and beautifully illuminated (probably incomplete) manuscript dating from the mid 15th century, originating from Hyde Abbey in England. It comprises a narrative of Anglo-Saxon history commencing with the legends of Albina and Brutus up to the year 1023 and includes copies of a number of Anglo-Saxon charters and wills plus one set of Anglo-Saxon bounds; among its contents are the only known will of King Eadred of England (reigned 946-955) plus one of only 2 known copies of the will of Alfred the Great. This work is now in the British Library.)

The Earls of Macclesfield are (or at least were) protective of their privacy, allowing few visitors to see the inside of the castle and denying requests for access for an examination to scholars of medieval architecture, with the result that Anthony Emery wrote in 2006: "Shirburn Castle has a well deserved reputation for being barred to all students of architecture ...Consequently, the castle has never been studied in detail ...The list [of persons denied entry] extends from Lord Torrington in 1775 to Nikolaus Pevsner, the architectural staff of Country Life, and the Department of the Environment recorders 200 years later. ...Not surprisingly, Shirburn has been ignored by all writers on castles except for the summaries of ownership by Sir James Mackenzie, The Castles of England, 1 (1897) 163-5 and Sir Charles Oman, Castles (1926) 46-9". (It should also be noted that the list of excluded persons also included Emery himself, who was unable to report further on the interior.) The medieval entrance hall, a surviving room from the pre-eighteenth century castle, was previously illustrated by J. Skelton "after F. Mackenzie" and published in Skelton's Antiquities of Oxfordshire in 1824 (see "external links").

Emery postulates that after Thomas Parker purchased the castle in 1716, the latter's renovations probably affected more than three-quarters of the building, with the result that what stands at Shirburn today is "essentially an eighteenth-century interpretation of the medieval castle, following its original plan", although he allows that survivals from the original fourteenth-century structure include a "reasonable amount of the west range" (which would include the bulk of the main gate tower), the lower stages of two corner towers, and "possibly some ground-level walling internally", although he was unable to inspect the latter in person. The Victoria County History also suggests that: "The present south range may represent the medieval south range, with new windows inserted and with another range of rooms added to the south, outside the original outer wall." In a 1981 paper discussing the architecture of the present castle, authors Timothy Mowl and Brian Earnshaw suggest that the eighteenth-century rebuild intentionally incorporated round-arched, or neo-Norman, expressions of medievalism, "probably to assert a link with a supposed Norman foundation." The same authors also point to Vanbrugh Castle, a London house designed and built by John Vanbrugh in 1719 for his own family, as a similar expression of neo-medievalism of around the same date, again with rounded windows, in contrast to the more pointed windows associated with the mid-18th century "Gothick" style of a few decades later. The rounded window style appears to have been used consistently in the Parker-era rebuild or renovation, including in all of the surviving inward-facing walls surrounding the courtyard, although from 1830, the effect was masked by the incorporation of more "standard" segmental-headed sash windows in the new external additions along several frontages. Considering all of the accounts presently available, it would seem to be the case that, at a time when his contemporaries had most recently been constructing their new country houses in the English Baroque style (or even neo-medieval, in the case of Vanbrugh Castle), Parker decided to purchase an actual, habitable 14th-century castle and construct his new residence entirely within it, at the same time adding new windows to the surviving medieval walls and towers in the Georgian style.

Among the household of Thomas Parker, the 1st Earl, was his friend, the Welsh mathematician William Jones (1675–1749), close friend of Sir Isaac Newton and Sir Edmund Halley, who acted as tutor to Parker's son George, the future second Earl. Jones had earlier acquired the extensive library and archive of the mathematician John Collins (1625–1683), which contained several of Newton's letters and papers written in the 1670s, and later edited and published many of Newton's manuscripts. His collection of books and papers eventually passed into the Earl's library and was passed down through the Parker family until the 2000s; the Newton-associated items were ultimately sold to the Cambridge University Library (see below).

George Parker, the 2nd Earl of Macclesfield (c.1695–1764) resided at Shirburn and inherited the earldom and the castle upon his father's death in 1732. He was celebrated as an astronomer and spent much time conducting astronomical observations at Shirburn, where he built an observatory and a chemical laboratory. The observatory was "equipped with the finest existing instruments" and the 2nd Earl used it from 1740. In 1761 the astronomer Thomas Hornsby observed the transit of Venus from the castle grounds. A 1778 mezzotint by James Watson, a copy of which is now in the National Maritime Museum, shows the 2nd Earl's two astronomical assistants, Thomas Phelps and John Bartlett, at work in the observatory.

=== c.1800-current (Parker era, second part) ===
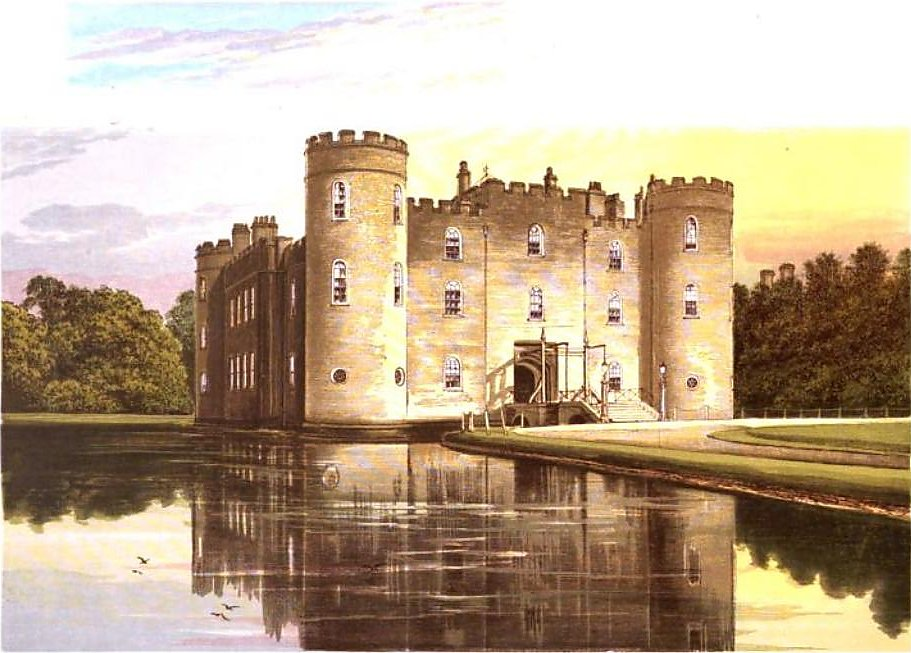
Shirburn Castle, coloured engraving from Morris, 1880, "A Series of Picturesque Views of Seats of the Noblemen and Gentlemen of Great Britain and Ireland", vol. 3. Additional extensions can be seen to the exterior of the original north wall (left side in this view) as compared with the 1818 view reproduced above.

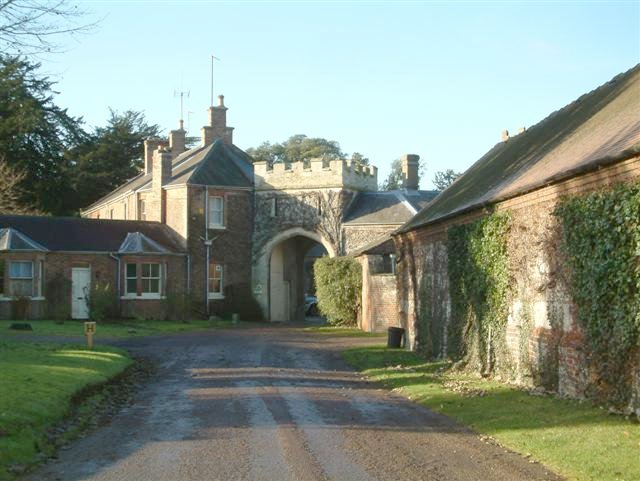
Shirburn Castle: the 19th-century Gatehouse, viewed from Castle Road

In the early years of the 19th century, additional works were carried out, among them the (re)construction of the west access stairway and addition of the fine Regency drawbridge, (visible by 1818 in the engraving by J. Neale) and the roofing over of the courtyard at a low level, providing additional internal ground floor and basement space. The Victoria County History entry for the castle states: "In 1830 a fairly extensive modernization was undertaken—a drawing-room and library over it were added on the north side; the old north library over the hall was converted into a billiard room; the former drawing-room which had been over the dining-room on the east side was converted into a larger bedroom and a dressing-room; and the baths on the ground floor on the north side were removed. In 1870 the red-brick water tower adjoining the laundry was built and in 1873 the warder's room in the north-west tower and the low entresol above it were thrown into one to make a smoking-room." It is also apparent that the 19th century additions involved construction of extended outer sections of the north, east and south facades, which now display numerous rectangular sash windows of the Victorian style as opposed to the rounded Georgian windows of the 18th century makeover (the latter can still be seen to be present on the walls facing the internal courtyard, however, as evidenced by the aerial footage shown in the "external links" section).

J.P. Neale, in his 1847 "Mansions of England" work, had to rely for his description of the interior on an account by J.N. Brewer from 1813, who wrote:

The interior of Shirbourn Castle is disposed in a style of modern elegance and comfort, that contains no allusion to the external castellated character of the structure, with an exception of one long room fitted up as an armoury. On the sides of this apartment are hung various pieces of mail, together with shields, tilting-spears, and offensive arms, of modern as well as ancient date. In a due situation is placed the chair of baronial dignity. The rooms are in general well proportioned, but not of very large dimensions. There are two capacious libraries, well furnished with books, and tastefully adorned with paintings and sculpture. Among the portraits are several of Lord Chancellor Macclesfield, and an original of Catherine Parr, queen to Henry VIII. ... Within the castle are constructed both warm and cold baths, a luxury which too tardily creeps on the notice of this country, but which is one of the most desirable in which rank and affluence can indulge.

At least one Victorian visitor, the library scholar Edward Edwards, was granted access to the library (in fact two libraries, North and South) around 1860, resulting in a comprehensive – but unfortunately never published – catalogue of the contents (refer Quarrie, 2006), and also a shorter account of its principal contents in the relevant chapter of his 1864 publication Libraries and Founders of Libraries, together with the activities of the Earls of Macclesfield up to that date (refer Bibliography). Fortunately for scholars of the Anglo-Saxon period, Edwards also transcribed and translated one of the library's most important manuscripts (which happened to deal with that period), the fifteenth century Liber Monasterii de Hyda, which he reproduced in published form in 1866. Later, the ballad scholar Andrew Clark was permitted to view and transcribe the "Shirburn Ballads", an early seventeenth century manuscript collection of mostly earlier published ballads (many of the originals since lost), resulting in his publication of The Shirburn Ballads 1585-1615 in 1907; some occasions of a small number of other visits to the library by additional scholars for particular purposes are also detailed in Quarrie's 2006 paper.

An early 20th-century photograph showing the interior of the South Library while it still contained its complement of books is reproduced in Mark Purcell's 2019 book, "The Country House Library", which also covers the contents of the library in some more detail, while a 2009 article by David Wilson, otherwise concerned with one particular piece of sculpture (a plaster bust of the 1st Earl by John Michael Rysbrack), also reproduces as its Figure 12 a quite detailed 2004 interior view of one of the libraries prior to the dispersal of the collection.

One other record of a successful 19th-century visit survives, in the form of Walter Money's report "A Walk to Shirburn Castle", from the Journal of the British Archaeological Association for December 1895, which describes the interior in some detail from p. 290 onwards, especially with regard to some particular items of interest in the armoury, plus an extensive list of the more important portraits and other pictures to be seen in various rooms, together with a description and illustration of a Roman sarcophagus originally found in the garden, being used as a pedestal. A more recent, detailed account is contained in the 2003 litigation of Macclesfield v. Parker, and is included in full below. (Note: The following account is included in the case of Macclesfield v. Parker, 2003: 27. It will, I hope, help understanding if I give a description of the layout of the castle. As originally constructed, the castle was rectangular in shape, built around a central courtyard. The courtyard probably survived the remodelling carried out by the First Earl. During the nineteenth century the courtyard was roofed over, and the space that it formerly occupied is now occupied, in the basement, by cellars and other domestic offices. 28. At ground floor level there are three entrances to the castle, each one by way of a bridge over the moat. The original entrance (though not the current entrance) was via the gatehouse in the middle of the western side. The gatehouse would have led to the courtyard, but, as I have said, it is now roofed over. The southern side of the castle is occupied by two ranges of rooms on either side of a corridor. The northernmost range (at the southern end of the former courtyard) is separated from the outer wall by a long corridor known as the bell passage. Proceeding anti-clockwise from the gatehouse to the south eastern corner of the castle, and taking the northernmost range of rooms first, one encounters the old kitchen, the servants' hall, the small study, and a photographic dark room. In parallel, the southernmost range of rooms contains the kitchen, the breakfast room, the pantry kitchen, the small sitting room and the oak dining room. Board meetings of the company were held from time to time in the oak dining room, which is in one of the round towers. Between the breakfast room and the pantry kitchen is another entrance to the castle over a bridge. This is the entrance currently used as the main entrance. 29. The eastern side of the ground floor is occupied by the dining room and the smoking room. These are two of the so-called "state rooms". The tower at the north eastern end of the castle is currently locked. 30. The northern side of the castle also has two parallel ranges of rooms. That closest to the old courtyard (on the southern side) consists of the baronial hall; probably added in the nineteenth century. The other consists of a WC, an ante room and the drawing room. The baronial hall and the drawing room are also "state rooms". At the north-western corner of the ground floor, again in one of the round towers, is the gun room. 31. There are two staircases on the ground floor, leading up to the first floor. One is the main staircase, which is elaborately carved. The other is the pink staircase, so-called because it is painted pink. The pink staircase rises towards the south-eastern corner of the first floor, while the main staircase rises towards the north-eastern corner. There is also a mediaeval spiral staircase at the western end of the castle. 32. The western end of the first floor is occupied by a kitchen and dining room. In the round tower at the south-western corner there is a WC and a laundry room. As with the ground floor, the southern side of the first floor contains two parallel ranges of rooms. The northernmost consists entirely of the white library. The southernmost consists of the Turkish bedroom, an adjacent bathroom, a sitting room, and a study. The round tower at the south-eastern corner of the castle is occupied by a WC and bathroom. The eastern side of the first floor consists of a bedroom (currently occupied by the Countess' father), the four poster room, the crimson bedroom and the "ugly" bedroom. It is not the bedroom itself which is ugly, but the elaborate bed in it. The round tower at the north-eastern corner contains a bedroom. On the northern side of the first floor is a dressing room. This is the bedroom suite which the Earl and Countess occupy. The remainder of the northern side of the castle is taken up with two parallel libraries, the north library and the south library. The latter is reached by the flying staircase. These are also "state rooms". 33. The principal access to the second floor is via the pink staircase. The rooms surrounding the former courtyard (on the inner sides of the floor and reached via the traditional green baize door) were formerly servants' rooms. There are ten in all. They are now almost derelict. The southern side of this floor consists of four rooms which have traditionally been bedrooms and sitting rooms for younger members of the family. The eastern side consists of four rooms and a bathroom. One of these rooms was formerly the nursery. 34. The nature and layout of the rooms makes it difficult to find a combination of rooms which would make a satisfactory self-contained dwelling within the castle, either by vertical or horizontal division. 35. As one would expect, the castle is also provided with a number of outbuildings. These include the old brewery, the old dairy, the old stores, stables, tack rooms and the like, and buildings which accommodate the generating equipment formerly used to power the batteries which in turn provided the castle with electricity. They are mainly in the estate yard. 36. The castle is, as I have said, surrounded by a moat. Beyond the moat are the grounds. They are mostly laid to grass, with little formal planting. The grounds contain a derelict orangery and a temple in the Palladian style. 37. Unfortunately the castle is in a poor state of repair. Little has been done to it, probably for a century. The electrical system has failed, and most of the castle is plunged into darkness at nightfall. A professional estimate puts the costs of putting it into proper repair as being some £2.6 million.)

The external gatehouse, providing vehicular access to the castle from Castle Road, is stated as being a nineteenth century creation, in the gothic style, and is Grade II listed.

With the exception of the 5th Earl, who was blind and chose to remain at his early home at Eynsham Hall, until 2005 all subsequent earls resided at the castle, including Thomas Parker, the 3rd Earl (1723–1795), a Fellow of the Royal Society; George Parker, the 4th Earl (1755–1842), Comptroller of the Royal Household, Captain of the Yeomen of the Guard, and a Fellow of the Royal Society; Thomas Augustus Parker, the 6th Earl (1811–1896), George Loveden Parker, the 7th Earl (1888–1975), George Roger Parker, the 8th Earl (1914–1992), and lastly his son Richard Parker, 9th Earl of Macclesfield (born 1943).

== Ownership and occupancy issues and dispute, and sale of contents ==
The Macclesfield Psalter, one of the treasures of the collection of the Earls of Macclesfield at Shirburn Castle, sold at auction for £1.7 million in 2004 and now in the collection of Cambridge University’s Fitzwilliam Museum

To reduce future tax liabilities, in 1922 ownership of the castle was transferred from the Seventh Earl, George Loveden Parker to the Beechwood Estates Company (the Macclesfield family estate management company), with equity divided among the family members. Unfortunately for the succession, however, this had the result of decoupling ownership and the automatic right to occupy the castle from inheritance of the title, and in the early 21st century, following a long-running and acrimonious court battle, the 9th Earl of Macclesfield, the last Earl to reside at the castle, was evicted from the family seat by the other family members, departing in 2005: the 9th Earl contending that a "draft lease" gave him the right to occupy the whole of the castle—or at least a portion of it—for his lifetime in exchange for an appropriate rent payable to the family company (of which the terms were yet to be agreed), however this was contested, ultimately successfully, by the company who contended that he was "no more than [a] tenant at will [of the company]", whose tenancy could therefore be terminated. The 9th Earl lost the occupancy of the house, but retained ownership of the contents (gifted to him in 1967 by his grandfather, the Seventh Earl) including three libraries containing many rarities among their more than 30,000 volumes, largely assembled by the first two Earls of Macclesfield in the first part of the 18th century.

Following his departure from the castle, the 9th Earl made the decision to sell the contents of the libraries, as well as some other items from the castle's holdings. The library items were prepared for a series of auctions, and were catalogued for the first time by staff from Sotheby's in 2004; among the most notable items discovered were a first edition of Copernicus's 1543 landmark work "On the Revolutions of the Celestial Spheres", annotated by the celebrated 17th-century Oxford mathematician John Greaves, which sold at auction for £666,400, and a unique and superbly illustrated 252-page 14th-century illuminated manuscript, the Macclesfield Psalter, now in the Fitzwilliam Museum in Cambridge. Other items originally forming part of the library were a collection of Welsh material which went to form part of the foundation collections of the National Library of Wales, correspondence of Sir Isaac Newton and other scientific papers which were sold to Cambridge University Library, and manuscripts including the original of the "Shirburn Ballads" (previously transcribed and published in 1907), the Liber de Hyda and the Macclesfield Alphabet Book, these items purchased by the British Library. The breaking up and dispersal by auction of the library was lamented by some, including Roger Gaskell and Patricia Fara, who in 2005 wrote: "Now, without any public discussion, the Macclesfield Library is being broken up. Far more than simply a collection of old books belonging to one man, it is a fabulous treasure trove containing many of the most significant books, owned and annotated by several leading British figures in the history of European science... Formed in the 17th and 18th centuries, this is a coherent collection that was the working library of an intellectual and scientific powerhouse." On completion of the initial round of 6 sales of the scientific portion of the collection, Sotheby's issued a 2005 press release indicating that the sale process had thus far realised in excess of £14 million (not including The Macclesfield Psalter, which sold separately for £1,685,600), representing "the highest total ever for any sale of scientific books and manuscripts". Additional parts of the library sold by Sotheby's between 2006 and 2008, under the general heading "The Library of the Earls of Macclesfield, Removed from Shirburn Castle", comprised "Bibles 1477-1739" (part 7), "Theology, Philosophy, Law, and Economics" (part 8, which realised £1.3 million), "Voyages Travel and Atlases" (part 9), "Applied Arts and Sciences, including Military and Naval Books" (part 10), "English Books and Manuscripts" (part 11) and "Continental Books and Manuscripts" (part 12, which realised £1.8 million). Further selections from the library were offered at auction by Maggs Brothers, U.K. in 2010 and 2012. A set of 328 bound theology volumes acquired from the Macclesfield collection sale now forms part of the Kinlaw Library at Asbury University, a private Christian university in Wilmore, Kentucky, U.S.A.

The castle contents also included a number of fine paintings, one of which, George Stubbs's 1768 masterpiece "Brood Mares and Foals", subsequently sold at auction in 2010 for £10,121,250, a record price for the British artist. This painting was visible, in passing, on the wall in a room at the castle used for filming in the 1992 episode "Happy families" of the Inspector Morse TV series (see below). Previously, a 1740 William Hogarth portrait of the second Earl's tutor and mathematician William Jones, was sold at auction in 1984 for £280,000, and is now in the National Portrait Gallery. Earlier in 1998, an extremely fine Georgian silver wine set, the only known complete example of its era to survive, had been sold by Christies and is now in the Victoria and Albert Museum, its purchase assisted by a £750,000 grant from the National Heritage Memorial Fund. The Shirburn collection of sculptures, described in a Christie's lot essay as "one of the most important English collections of sculpture to be assembled in the 18th century", appears to have been mainly dispersed by sale at auction in 2005, as per a Christie's auction catalogue "The Macclesfield Sculpture", Sale 7104A, 1 December 2005, containing 132 lots, full details of which are not publicly available although some (but apparently not all) can be viewed as a subset of the sale details online, as Lots 50 through 80 which include a number of plaster busts, a dozen bronzes, a marble and a terracotta figure, and (as lot 63) an impressive Roman marble Cinerarium which sold for £43,200. Two bronzes from this sale that do not appear on the cited Christie's page, "Dancing Faun" and "Medici Venus" by Pietro Cipriani, both copies of original antique statues in the Uffizi Gallery, are now in the Getty Museum in the U.S.A.; some other items from that sale have since appeared again on the auction market.

Two other items of cultural interest, a c.1721-22 marble sculpture of Hebe plus a second of Ganymede and the Eagle, both by the Italian sculptor Antonio Montauti, acquired by Parker circa 1723-25 and located since then at Shirburn, subsequently thought "lost" but stated in 2009 to be "the property of a lady", sold at auction for £79,250 each in 2009. In 2022, a fine portrait of the Second Earl by Sebastiano Conca also appeared on the market, described as "the property of a nobleman", after being "in the North Library at Shirburn Castle, Oxfordshire, and by descent to the current owner", selling at Christie's for £378,000. The contents of the early eighteenth century armoury, including items from both the Gage and Parker eras, were also sold following the 9th earl's departure. A privately produced account of the armoury was written by Alan Brett in 2007.

Another two items of interest from the collection were two superbly illustrated botanical albums consisting of original paintings of plants, by Mary Countess of Macclesfield (wife of the Third Earl) and her daughter Lady Elizabeth Parker, dating from the period 1756–1767; both ladies were instructed by Georg Dionysius Ehret, the pre-eminent botanical artist of the day and their paintings follow his style closely. These were sold at auction by Maggs Bros. in 2022 for £225,000 and now reside in the Huntington Library in San Marino, California.

Since the departure of the 9th Earl, the castle appears to have remained largely vacant and, at that time, in need of substantial repairs (estimated as "some £2.6 million" in 2003). Subsequently, the owners have started to address this aspect, commissioning replacement of a number of sections of the roof and treatment of associated timbers, as documented by the contractors concerned. Although its name is not mentioned, the castle is also recognisably one of several offered as "castle" film locations as described via the Location Works agency.

== The park ==
The castle sits within extensive grounds (Shirburn Park, itself Grade II listed), which is described in more detail at the relevant "Historic England" listing, with the brief description "Later C18 and early C19 garden and pleasure grounds around a late C14 castle, remodelled 1720s and early C19, set in a landscape park incorporating the remains of an early to mid C18 formal layout." It incorporates a rotunda and a former orangery, the latter now derelict. Mowl and Earnshaw note that the development of the gardens was probably unfinished on account of Thomas Parker's well known downfall and financial troubles from 1725 onwards, and that further developments were likely undertaken by the second Earl in a classical style, forming a stylistic contrast with what they characterise as the neo-Medieval nature of the first Earl's renovated castle.

== Use as film location ==
On account of its "fairy tale" appearance, romantic setting, and near-original condition Georgian/Victorian interior, the castle has been used as a film location on a number of occasions, including external, and some internal shots as the Balcombe family home in the 1992 episode "Happy Families" of the Inspector Morse TV series, internal rooms, the gatehouse entrance and the church as Midsomer Priory for a 2011 episode "A Sacred Trust" of the Midsomer Murders TV series (although exterior shots of the "priory" house feature Greys Court, another Oxfordshire location), as well as an exterior shot of Mycroft Holmes's country estate for the 2011 film Sherlock Holmes: A Game of Shadows. The location has also been used in 2 episodes of Poirot, namely "Third Girl" (2008) and "Curtain: Poirot's Last Case" (2013); in Annie: A Royal Adventure! (1995 TV movie), Philomena (2013), in the TV serial London Spy (2015) and—with a certain amount of digital manipulation to remove post-medieval alterations—in The Old Guard (2020). A 2016 Burberry commercial, "The Tale of Thomas Burberry" was also mainly filmed at Shirburn Castle. In the 2011 Midsomer Murders Episode "A Sacred Trust", the coat of arms of the fictitious Vertue family, Lords of the Manor and as represented in the supposedly local pub "The Vertue Arms", is constructed almost identically to that of the (real) Parker family, Earls of Macclesfield and owners of the film location for the fictitious priory at Shirburn Castle. The castle was also used in the seventh episode of the TV series The Gentlemen, "Not Without Danger" (2024), and in the sixth episode of the second season of SAS: Rogue Heroes.

== Bibliography ==
- Edwards, Edward (1864): Libraries and Founders of Libraries. Chapter X. The Life of Thomas Parker, Earl of Macclesfield; - The Life of Nicholas Joseph Foucault; - and the Library at Shirburn Castle in Oxfordshire (p. 327 ff.). Available at https://books.google.com/books?id=7SYCAAAAQAAJ
- Gaskell, Roger & Fara, Patricia (2005): Selling the silver: country house libraries and the history of science. Endeavour 29(1): 14-19. . doi:10.1016/j.endeavour.2005.01.005
- Mackenzie, Sir James Dixon (1896). The Castles of England: their story and structure Vol. I. Harvard University: The Macmillan co.
- Pevsner, Nikolaus; Sherwood, Jennifer (1974). The Buildings of England: Oxfordshire. Harmondsworth: Penguin. pp. 761–763. ISBN 0-14-071045-0.
- [Victoria County History]: 'Parishes: Shirburn', in A History of the County of Oxford: Volume 8, Lewknor and Pyrton Hundreds, ed. Mary D Lobel (London, 1964), pp. 178–198. British History Online https://www.british-history.ac.uk/vch/oxon/vol8/pp178-198 [accessed 18 October 2022].
