= Jonathan Anderson Bell =

Jonathan Anderson Bell (3 November 1806 – 28 February 1865) was a Scottish architect, known also as a draughtsman for watercolour paintings.

== Biography ==
Bell was born in Glasgow, the third child and second son of advocate James Bell and Janet Hamilton Bell. He was the brother of Henry Glassford Bell and Jane Cross Simpson, He was educated at Edinburgh University. He spent most of 1829 and 1830 in Rome, as an art student. He then served his articles as an architect, and remained for some years afterwards, in the office of Messrs. Rickman & Hutchison of Birmingham. Thomas Rickman was a major figure of the English Gothic Revival, and became a close friend.

For around 27 years, Bell practised as an architect in Edinburgh. His designs included country houses, such as Beeslack for Charles Cowan, and the Scottish baronial Victoria Buildings, Glasgow for Archibald Orr Ewing. He was a member of the Institute of Scottish Architects. In 1839 he was appointed secretary to the Royal Association for the Promotion of the Fine Arts in Scotland, a position he retained it until his death.

Bell died 28 February 1865.

== Works ==
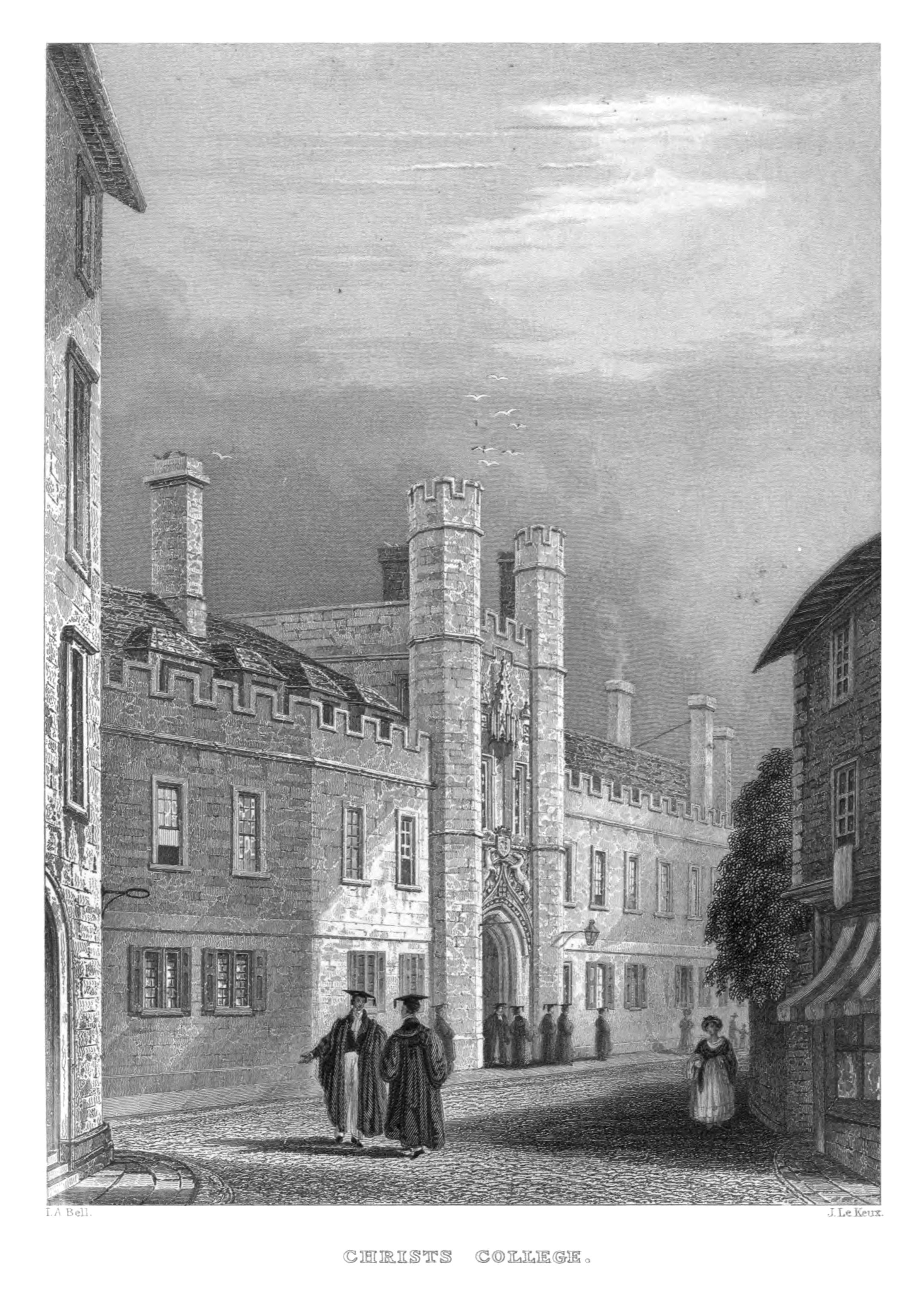
Christ's College, Cambridge, engraving by John Le Keux after Jonathan Anderson Bell

Thirty of the engravings in John Le Keux's Memorials of Cambridge are from Bell's drawings. His Dryburgh Abbey was engraved by William Miller. As a watercolour painter, he was known for landscapes and marine scenes, Italian subjects, and still lifes.

Bell's poems were printed only for private circulation. The volume, printed posthumously in 1865, contained a biography.

== Notes ==
Attribution

This article incorporates text from a publication now in the public domain: Stephen, Leslie, ed. (1885). "Bell, Jonathan Anderson". Dictionary of National Biography. Vol. 4. London: Smith, Elder & Co.
