= Jane Cross Simpson =

Scottish writer

Jane Cross Simpson (1811–1886) was a Scottish writer, known as a hymn-writer and poet.

== Life ==
The daughter of James Bell, advocate, and sister to Henry Glassford Bell and Jonathan Anderson Bell, she was born Jane Cross Bell in Glasgow on 12 November 1811. Educated by her father, she studied the classics, and travelled much on the continent. For some years from 1822, her father was assessor and town-clerk of Greenock, and she contributed to the Greenock Advertiser under the pseudonym "Gertrude".

After her husband's death, Jane Simpson resided with her married daughter, Mrs. Napier, at Portobello, Edinburgh, then Newport-on-Tay, and then Aberdeen. She died at Aberdeen on 17 June 1886.

== Works ==
In 1831, as "Gertrude", Jane Bell wrote a noted hymn on prayer, Go when the morning shineth, for the Edinburgh Literary Journal, then edited by her brother Henry. She also contributed, in prose and verse, to the Scottish Christian Herald. She published Piety of Daily Life, tales and sketches, in 1836.

As Jane Simpson, she published:

- April Hours, a poem, 1838.
- Woman's History, 1848.
- Linda, or Beauty and Genius, 1859; 2nd edit. 1884.
- Household edition of Burns's Works in Prose and Verse, edited by Gertrude, 2 vols. 1870.
- Picture Poems, and Linda and other Poems, 1879.

In her later years Simpson wrote for Good Words, the Christian Leader, and other periodicals. Her hymns appeared in: Charles Rogers's Lyra Britannica, 1867; James Martineau's Hymns, 1873; Ebenezer Prout's Psalmist, 1878; and the Scottish Evangelical Hymnal, 1878.

== Family ==
In 1837 Jane Bell married her half-cousin, J. Bell Simpson, an artist and bibliographer, who was librarian of the Stirling Library, Glasgow, from 1851 to 1860; he published in 1872 Literary and Dramatic Sketches, and died on 17 December 1874. She was survived by two daughters out of a family of eight.

== Notes ==
Attribution

This article incorporates text from a publication now in the public domain: Lee, Sidney, ed. (1897). "Simpson, Jane Cross". Dictionary of National Biography. Vol. 52. London: Smith, Elder & Co.
