= Shirburn Ballads =

Collection of English ballads

The Shirburn Ballads
- The British Library, London
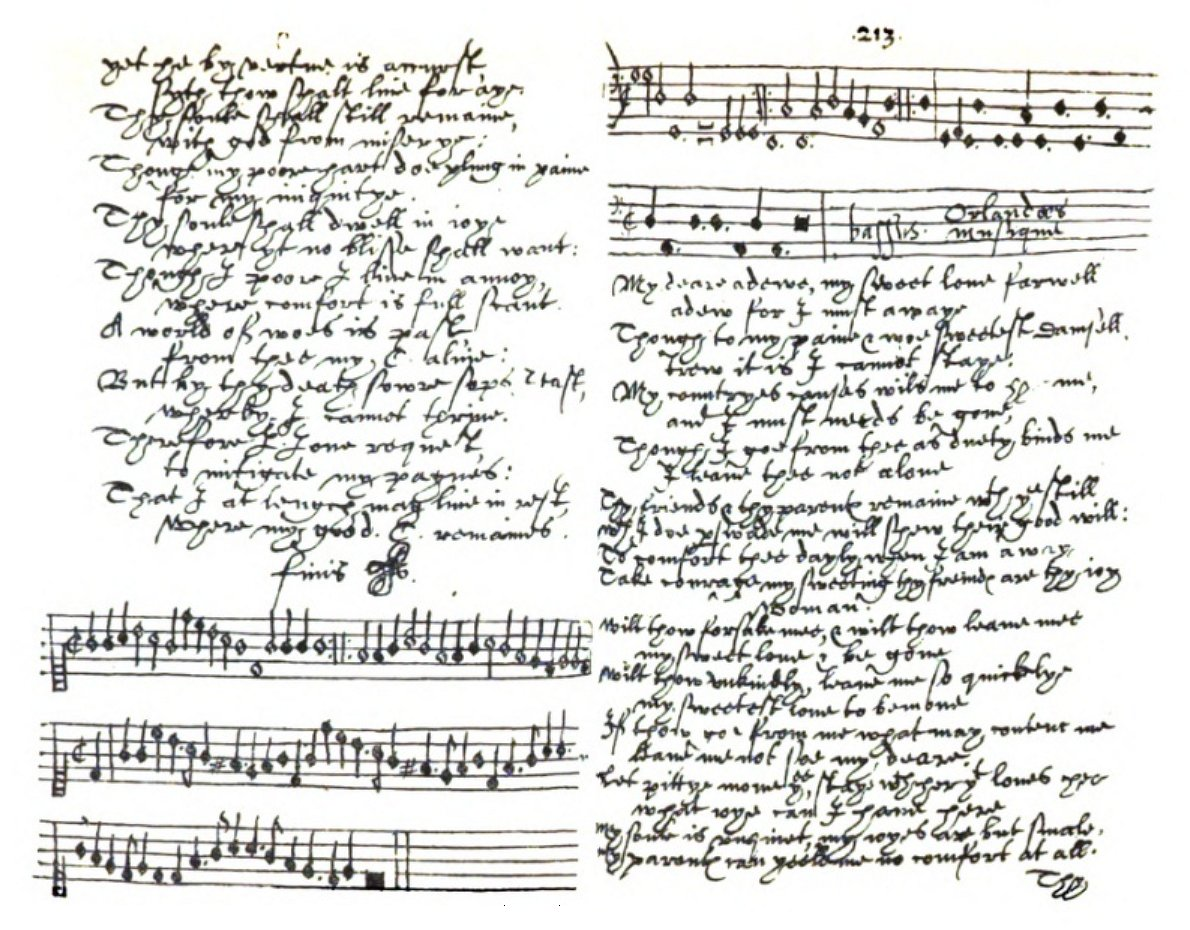
- 2 original pages of the "Shirburn Ballads", facsimile from Clark, A. "The Shirburn Ballads", 1907
- Date: c.1609-1616
- Language(s): English
- Material: paper
- Size: iii + 162 leaves
- Format: quarto
- Contents: texts of 80 English ballads, a few with associated tunes
- Previously kept: Shirburn Castle, Oxfordshire

The Shirburn Ballads is the name given to an early 17th-century manuscript collection of Elizabethan to early Stuart-era ballads that formerly resided in the collection of the Earls of Macclesfield in the library at Shirburn Castle. As per the Ballad Index compiled by W.B. Olsen, it is one of a number of significant sources for ballads of that period. According to the relevant entry in the Catalogue of English Literary Manuscripts 1450–1700, the main scribe may have been Edwarde Hull, whose name appears on leaf 155. It is believed that since the current set of leaves is numbered from 98 onwards, a further initial 97 leaves were once present but were lost prior to the set's binding in 1860. The collection is mainly known to scholars via an edited version that was published by the Reverend Andrew Clark in 1907 (refer Bibliography). Most or all of the included ballads derive from broadside ballad sources which were recorded as published for copyright purposes in relevant 16th-century sources, and include a subset for which the original broadside copy has not survived. Since 2007, the original work is now in the collection of the British Library.

== Description ==
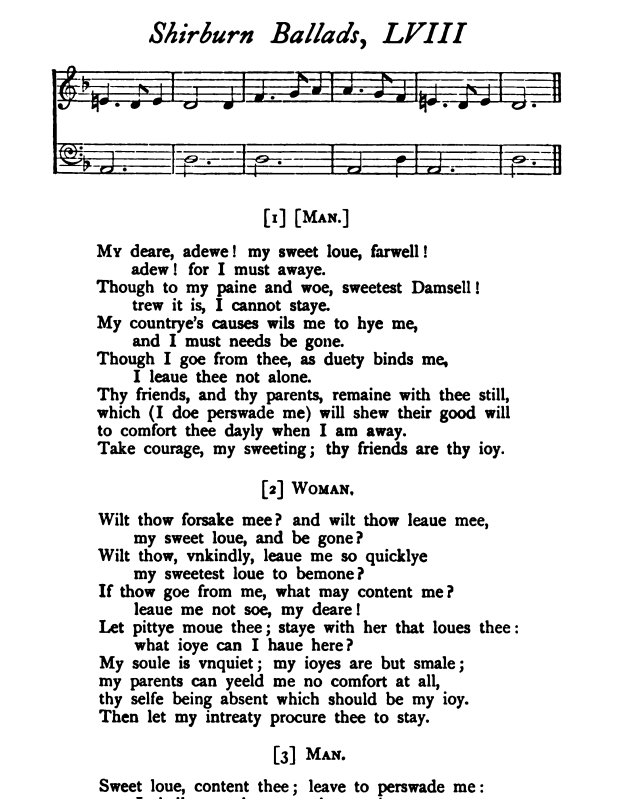
Transcript by A. Clark of one of the "Shirburn Ballads", 1907; this ballad entitled: "My dear, adieu! My sweet love, farewell" (transcript of item shown in original facsimile above, right hand side)

As described in the 1907 transcript by Andrew Clark, the book comprises 162 leaves, written on both sides, each measuring 6 by 3 inches. Subsequently added numbers go from [leaves] 98 to 257, indicating that the first 97 are missing. It was (re?)-bound in 1860 by Hatton of Manchester, in half-calf gilt. The name 'Edwarde Hull' is found on the reverse of the leaf labelled 155, "possibly the main scribe of the MS"; other names appearing as additions include those of Thomas Sturgies "the right Oner of this booke", Edward Sturgis, Thomas Manton, Richard Manton, Richard Halford and William Halford. According to the current British Library catalogue entry, the contents were copied directly from black-letter broadsides from the reigns of Elizabeth I and James I; although most of their titles are known from earlier portions of the Stationers' Register, the original printings of more than half have never been located. The text is mostly in a "single variable Secretary script", with annotations by possibly two other hands.

== History ==
According to the work itself, the collection was at one time in the ownership of Thomas Sturgies or Sturgis, and later passed into the collection of the Earls of Macclesfield who kept it as a component of their extensive library at Shirburn Castle (shelf-mark, Shirburn North Library 119 D 44), where it was catalogued by Edward Edwards in 1860, apparently when it was re-bound, and was located there some time prior to 1907 (possibly in 1893 per this note) such that it could be examined and transcribed by the historian and editor the Reverend Dr Andrew Clark. The volume was still in the possession of the Macclesfield family (in the person of the 9th Earl) when he departed the Castle in 2004, from whom it was purchased by private treaty by the British Library in 2007.

== Contents ==
The contents of the folio are as listed in the Andrew Clark published volume; for a more detailed listing in the context of other ballad collections of the period, refer W.B. Olsen's exhaustive "Broadside Ballad Index", which contains 71 references to items in the collection (marked "SHB"). Tunes are indicated for the majority of the ballads by a text instruction, for example no. VII, "All careful Christians, mark my song" is labelled "To the tune of Wigmor's Galliard", however in four instances the actual tune is provided in notation (refer example illustrations with this article).

== Significance ==
Andrew Clark, in the "Introduction" section to his transcript of the ballads, points out the following areas of significance of the collection:

- it preserves a number of ballads not found in the "great collections" (the latter often more voluminous), and possibly some are unique to this set
- it extends back to the Elizabethan/James I era, the texts for a number of ballads otherwise known only from later versions
- it provides alternative texts for scholarship, some arguably better than later printed copies, and
- it provides an example of the "library of ballads" which would have furnished relevant English households in around the time of Shakespeare.

Clark does note, however, the absence of any "Robin Hood" ballads, speculating that possibly, some could have been contained in the now-missing initial 97 leaves.

== Availability and digitisation ==
By contrast with some of the Library's other manuscript holdings, as at 2023 the work is not available online via the British Library and can only be accessed in the reading room where "[a] letter of introduction [is] required to view this manuscript". However, three 2-page spreads from the original ms were reproduced as facsimiles in Andrew Clark's 1907 publication, which can be viewed here (this one also reproduced at the head of the present article), here and here. For the entire 1907 transcript, refer "Bibliography", below.

== Bibliography ==
- The British Library Archives and Manuscripts Catalogue: The Shirburn Ballads: collection of eighty English ballads and songs of the 16th and early 17th centuries; transcribed circa temp. James I (between 1603-1625). ... Add MS 82932 : (1603-1625)
- Catalogue of English Literary Manuscripts 1450–1700 (CELM): The British Library: Additional MSS, numbers 60000 through end ("Shirburn Ballads" entry under "Add. MS 82932").
- Clark, Andrew, 1907: The Shirburn ballads, 1585–1616. Edited from the MS. Clarendon Press, Oxford, 380 pp. Available at https://archive.org/details/shirburnball100claruoft, another copy via HathiTrust at https://babel.hathitrust.org/cgi/pt?id=mdp.39015022205275&seq=7.
- Firth, C.H., 1911: "The ballad history of the reign of James I." Transactions of the Royal Historical Society (Third Series), 5: 21–61. doi:10.2307/3678360
- Gammond, Peter, ed., 1991: The Oxford Companion to Popular Music. Oxford University Press. (Entry on broadside ballads, pp. 82-83).
- Rollins, Hyder E., 1917: "Notes on the "Shirburn Ballads" ". The Journal of American Folklore, Jul.-Sep., 1917, vol. 30, no. 117: 370-377. Available at https://www.jstor.org/stable/pdf/534380.pdf .
- Swaen, A. E. H., 1907: "Review of "The Shirburn Ballads, 1585-1616" by Andrew Clark". The Modern Language Review, 3(1), 76–80. doi:10.2307/3712894
