= Andrew Clark (priest) =

Anglican clergyman and diarist

Reverend Dr Andrew Clark (7 June 1856 – 24 March 1922) was a Church of England minister, a prodigious editor of literary and historical texts, and is now well known for his lengthy diary of the First World War.

== Life ==
Born in Dollarfield, near Dollar, Clackmannanshire, Scotland, Clark was educated at the University of St Andrews, then at the University of Oxford. He matriculated from Balliol College but won a scholarship at Lincoln College in 1876. He read Greats and graduated with a First in 1879.

He was elected to a Fellowship at Lincoln College in 1880 and ordained in 1884. He was Chaplain of Lincoln and vicar of two Oxford churches, All Saints and St Michael at the North Gate. In 1894 he took up the position of parish priest in Great Leighs, Essex, held in the patronage of Lincoln College.

When in Oxford Clark began editing numerous works for the Oxford Historical Society, including four volumes of the Register of the University of Oxford (1887–89), three volumes of Anthony Wood's History of the City of Oxford (1889–99) and five volumes of the Life and Times of Anthony Wood (1891–1900); and then six volumes for the Early English Text Society, the English Register of Godstow Nunnery (1905–11), the English Register of Oseney Abbey (1907–13) and Lincoln Diocese Documents (1914). In 1893 he visited Shirburn Castle in order to study and transcribe the Shirburn Ballads, a folio of Elizabethan to early Stuart-era ballads that then resided in the collection of the Earls of Macclesfield, which eventually resulted in his 1907 publication The Shirburn ballads, 1585–1616. His two volumes of Aubrey's Brief Lives (1898) were a scholarly (but censored) edition. It was, no doubt, his deep experience of the writings of Aubrey and Wood that led him to appreciate the importance of popular belief, gossip and hearsay, and prompted his greatest work in chronicling the sensation of living through the Great War in Essex.

Although he was absent in Oxford when war was declared in 1914, he decided to keep a detailed diary of "Echoes of the Great War" in his village. The diary records the sights and sounds of the war in rural Essex, the activities of Clark's friends, relatives and acquaintances, and rumours relating to the war. The full diary (extending beyond the end of the war) runs to 92 volumes, and is held in the Bodleian Library, Oxford: a condensed version was published by James Munson as Echoes of the Great War (OUP, 1985). Extracts from the diaries relating to those commemorated on the Great Leighs War Memorial are available via the external link below.

In addition to his diary, Clark kept clippings during the war under the title 'English Words in Wartime', which are also held (along with other records sent by Clark) in the Bodleian. In addition to his volumes of historical records he also published some original books, such as The Colleges of Oxford (1891), Lincoln (College Histories, 1898), and A Bodleian Guide for Visitors (1906). Clark was a contributor to the Essex Review.

== Works ==
- Memoirs of Nathaniel, Lord Crewe (1893)

Edited volumes of Wood's Antiquities of the City of Oxford (1889–99)

=== Edited works ===
- The Colleges of Oxford: their history and traditions (1891)
- Lincoln (1898)
- 'Brief Lives', chiefly of Contemporaries, set down by John Aubrey, between the Years 1669 & 1696 (1898)
- The Life and Times of Anthony Wood: Antiquary, of Oxford, 1632–1695 (1900)
- The Shirburn ballads, 1585–1616 (1907)
- The English Register of Oseney Abbey (1907)

=== Contributions to the DNB ===
Clark's contributions to the Dictionary of National Biography, under the byline A. C.-k. included:

- Anthony Wood
- William Bright
- Drummond Percy Chase
- William Ince
- Robert Campbell Moberly
- Wentworth Webster
