= John Lingard of Pentonville =

English author and dry rot expert

John Lingard of Pentonville (24 February 1768 – March 1845) was an English author and expert in the field of dry rot. He also worked with Richard Holmes Laurie (a cartographer) to produce a detailed map of the area of London covering 32 square miles (83 km^{2}) from St Paul's Cathedral.

== Biography ==
Born in Aldermanbury, London, on 24 February 1768 to John and Ann, he was baptised in the Church of St Mary the Virgin on 27 March of the same year. After the death of his wife Sarah, John Lingard moved to new premises at 3 Ave Maria Lane where he lived until his death in the last quarter of 1845.

== Family ==
At the age of 23 Lingard married Sarah Hall (1772–1824) in the church of St George Hanover Square, 5 August 1791. Living on Cumming Street until Sarah's death in 1824. She was buried at St James's Church, Pentonville, on 25 November. Between 8 August 1792 and 24 April 1800 they had four children:

- John James Hood Lingard (8 August 1792 – 1868) Master of H.M.S. Brazen
- Sarah Sophia Lingard (24 March 1794 – 1871) Wife of English Engraver John Le Keux
- William Henry Lingard (1796—Unknown)
- Lucy Lingard (April 1800 – April 1864) Wife of Naval Lieutenant Joseph Ray

== Works ==
His most notable works include:

- A Philosophic and Practical Inquiry into the Nature and Constitution of Timber, 1819.
- A comparative view of the beauty, durability, and economy of the invulnerable oil paint with his remarks on the destructive and baleful properties of tar, used as a preventive against the decomposition of wood, iron, and stone, exposed to the atmosphere, 1825.
- A Multum in Parvo edition of Martyrs ... For the use of Protestant Schools, etc., 1839.
- Survey of the country around London : to the distance of thirty-two miles from St. Paul's. (or Lingard's miniature map and key extending 12 miles round London.), 1839?
- To the British nation. On the propriety and justice of the corn laws, as now regulated, 1840
- On the propriety and justice of the Corn Laws, as now regulated ... Second edition, 1840.
