= George Parker, 7th Earl of Macclesfield =

British earl (1888–1975)

Arms of Parker, Earls of Macclesfield: Gules, a chevron between three leopard's faces or

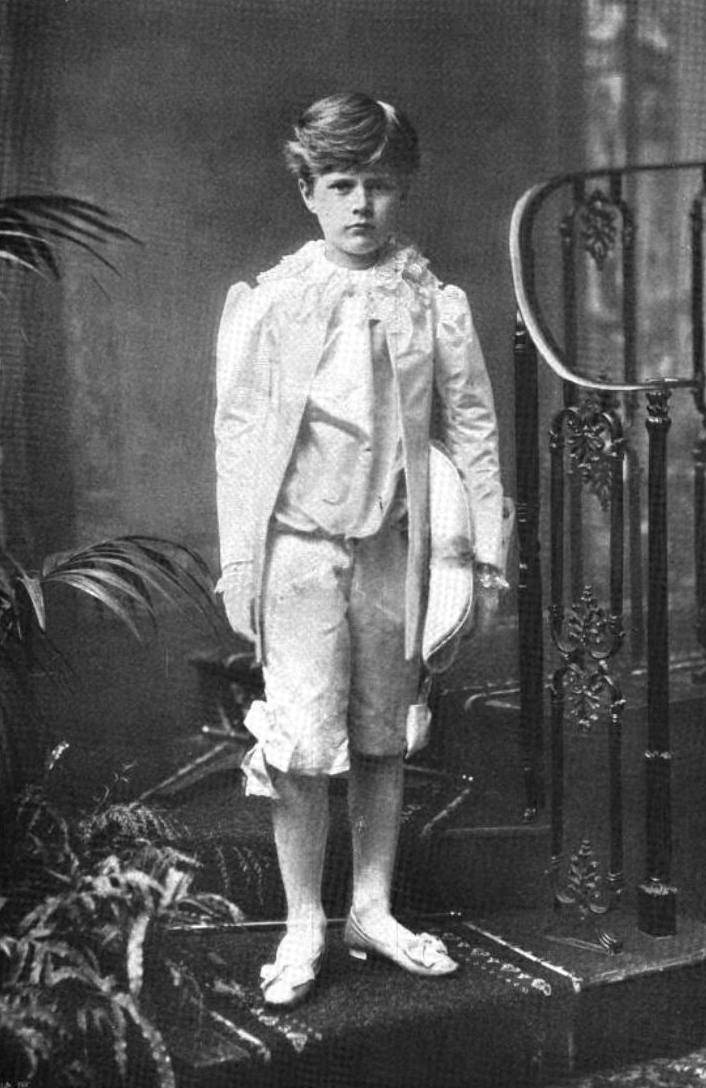
In The Sketch, 4 November 1896

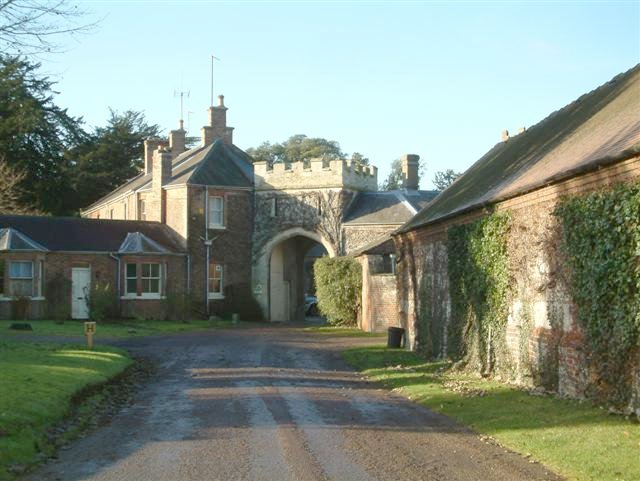
Gatehouse of Shirburn Castle, Oxfordshire, seat of the Earls of Macclesfield

George Loveden William Henry Parker, 7th Earl of Macclesfield (24 May 1888 – 20 September 1975), of Shirburn Castle, Oxfordshire, was a British peer and landowner. He was among the last to serve simultaneously as Lord Lieutenant of an English county and as chairman of its county council.

== Life ==
Born on 24 May 1888, George Parker was the only child of Viscount Parker (the heir of Thomas Parker, 6th Earl of Macclesfield), by his marriage to Carine Agnes, the daughter of Pryse Loveden, of Gogerddan, Cardiganshire. His father died in 1895.

On 24 July 1896, at the age of eight, Parker succeeded his grandfather as Earl of Macclesfield, a title he was to hold for seventy-nine years. The next year, his mother married secondly Captain L. W. Matthews, of the 5th Dragoon Guards, providing the young earl with a stepfather.

In 1909, Macclesfield married Lilian Joanna Vere Boyle, the daughter of Major Charles Boyle, of Great Milton, Oxfordshire. They had three sons, and the marriage lasted until his wife's death in 1974.

Whereas his grandfather's public life had been principally in national affairs, Macclesfield was more concerned with those of his native county. He became a Justice of the Peace for Oxfordshire in 1911, was elected to the Oxfordshire County Council, of which he was chairman from 1937 to 1970, was appointed a Deputy Lieutenant in 1935, and was Lord Lieutenant of Oxfordshire from 1954 to 1963.

He died on 20 September 1975 and was succeeded by his son, Viscount Parker.

Peerage of Great Britain
Preceded by Thomas Parker	Earl of Macclesfield; 1896–1975	Succeeded by George Parker
