= Thomas Parker, 1st Earl of Macclesfield =

English politician (1666–1732)

The Right Honourable The Earl of Macclesfield PC FRS
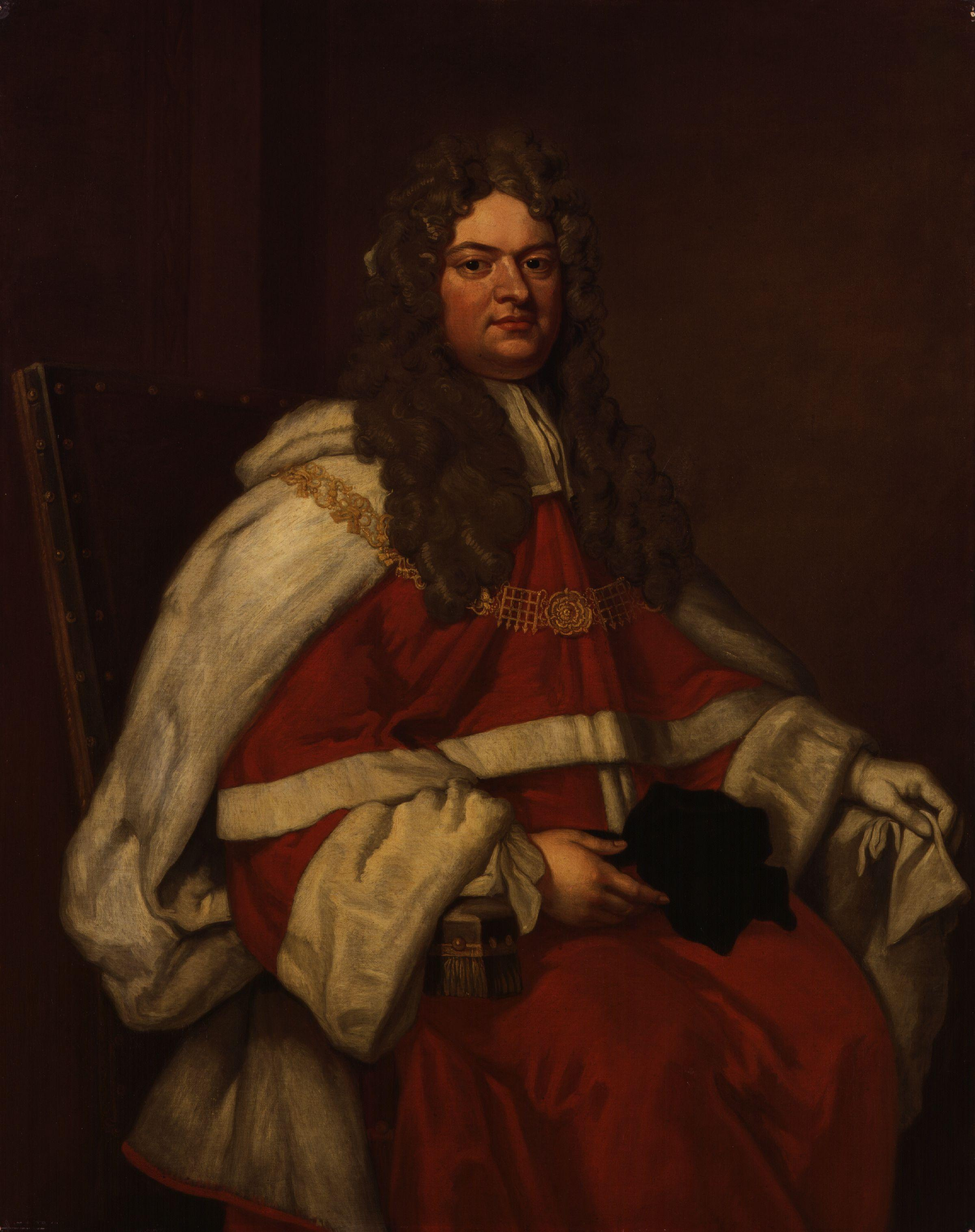
- Portrait after Sir Godfrey Kneller, 1712

Lord Chancellor
- In office 12 May 1718 – 7 January 1725
- Monarch: George I
- Prime Minister: Sir Robert Walpole (1721–1725)
- Preceded by: In Commission
- Succeeded by: In Commission

Personal details
- Born: 23 July 1666 Staffordshire, England
- Died: 28 April 1732 (aged 65)
- Occupation: Politician

Thomas Parker, 1st Earl of Macclesfield, PC, FRS (23 July 1666 – 28 April 1732) was an English Whig politician who represented Derby in the English and British House of Commons from 1705 to 1710. He also served as Lord Chief Justice from 1710 to 1718 and acted briefly as one of Great Britain's regents before the arrival of George I to England. Macclesfield's career ended when he was convicted of corruption on a massive scale, spending the final years of his life in retirement at his country estate of Shirburn Castle in Oxfordshire.

== Early life ==
Macclesfield's coat of arms

Thomas Parker was born on 23 July 1666 in Staffordshire, the son of the Leek attorney Thomas Parker and his wife Anne. Sir Richard Levinge, 1st Baronet, a leading figure in Irish public life for three decades, was his first cousin. He was educated at Adams' Grammar School at Newport, Shropshire, Derby School in 1680 and at Rev. Samuel Ogden's school at Derby. He was admitted at Inner Temple in 1684 and at Trinity College, Cambridge as a pensioner in 1685. On 23 April 1691, he married Janet Carrier, whose sister was the wife of William Anson and mother of the future Admiral Lord Anson. He was called to the bar in 1694. Together they had two children:

- Lady Elizabeth Parker (d. 21 Feb 1747) married Sir William Heathcote, 1st Baronet. They had six sons and three daughters.
- George Parker, 2nd Earl of Macclesfield (circa 1697 – 17 Mar 1764)

== Political career ==
Parker was returned as Whig Member of Parliament for Derby at the 1705 English general election and was appointed QC and serjeant-at-law and knighted on 9 July 1705. He was returned unopposed for Derby at the 1708 British general election. Like other Whigs, he voted for the general naturalization of foreign Protestants in 1709. Being one of the leading Whig lawyers in the House of Commons, he was deeply involved in the moves to impeach Dr Sacheverell. He was appointed to the committee to draw up the articles of impeachment on 14 December 1709. The committee was later given the management of the trial. In 1710 he refused the office of Lord High Chancellor of Great Britain, but was made a Privy Counsellor. The office of Lord Chief Justice fell vacant in 1710 and the administration wanted a quick replacement. Parker was appointed on 11 March 1710 and vacated his seat in the House of Commons.

== Lord Chief Justice ==
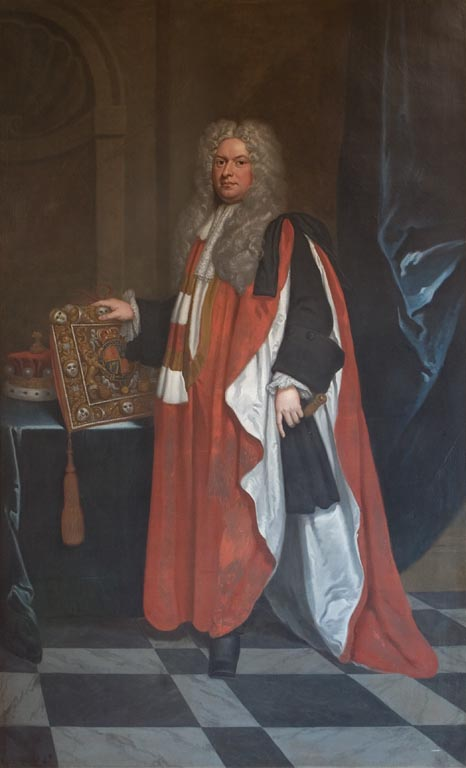
Portrait of Macclesfield by Sir Godfrey Kneller

From 1710 to 1718 Parker was involved in the prosecution of Henry Sacheverell. He made a vehement attack on Sacheverell and the high church clergy. He defended Whig propagandists and harried Tory publicists, including Defoe and Swift, on the slightest suspicion of favouring the Pretender. He spoke against the peace in the Privy Council in April 1713. In June 1714 he was given evidence of the recruiting activity of Jacobite agents which resulted in a price being placed on the Pretender's head. On 1 August 1714, Queen Anne died, and her successor, King George I, was in Hanover, so Baron Parker was designated as one of the regents of Great Britain, Ireland and the realms beyond the seas until the new monarch arrived in Britain. His support for the Hanoverian succession was appreciated by King George I who reappointed him lord chief justice in 1714, and raised him to the peerage as Baron Parker of Macclesfield in 1716, in which year he purchased, and then commenced to restore, Shirburn Castle in Oxfordshire, which was to be the seat of the house of Macclesfield for the next 300 years. In 1718, because the King could not speak English, Parker read the King's Speech in the House of Lords.

== Lord Chancellor ==
In 1718, Parker became Lord Chancellor, and was given a pension for life. In 1721, he was advanced to the title Earl of Macclesfield with the additional subsidiary title of Viscount Parker.

== Impeachment ==
In 1724, Parker was implicated in financial irregularities, but he did not resign as Lord High Chancellor of Great Britain until 1725. In 1725, he was impeached and tried in the House of Lords. He was, unanimously, convicted of corruption for taking more than £100,000 in bribes (the equivalent of more than £11,000,000 today). He was fined £30,000 and placed in the Tower of London until payment was received. He was also struck off the roll of the Privy Council. He was a fabulously wealthy man, possibly because of his corruption, but as this money was confiscated, he had no resources to pay a fine. He spent most of the rest of his life at Shirburn Castle. He died in Soho Square, London on 28 April 1732 and was buried at Shirburn.

Parker was elected a Fellow of the Royal Society in 1713. He was a friend of Bernard de Mandeville, whose satirical Fable of the Bees became highly controversial in the 1720s. He was patron of a grammar school built at Leek, his home town. In 1727, he was a pallbearer at the funeral of another friend, Sir Isaac Newton.

Parliament of England
Preceded by John Harpur; Thomas Stanhope	Member of Parliament for Derby; 1705–1707; With: Lord James Cavendish	Parliament of Great Britain
Parliament of Great Britain
Parliament of England	Member of Parliament for Derby; 1707–1710; With: Lord James Cavendish	Succeeded by Lord James Cavendish; Richard Pye
Legal offices
Preceded by Sir John Holt	Lord Chief Justice of the King's Bench; 1710–1718	Succeeded by Sir John Pratt
Political offices
Preceded by The Lord Cowper	Lord High Chancellor of Great Britain; 1718–1725	In commission Title next held by The Lord King
Honorary titles
Preceded by The Earl of Northampton	Custos Rotulorum of Warwickshire; 1719–1728	Succeeded by The Duke of Montagu
Peerage of Great Britain
New creation	Earl of Macclesfield; 1721–1732	Succeeded by George Parker
New creation	Baron Parker; 1714–1732	Succeeded by George Parker
