= MI8 =

Department of British military intelligence (historical)

MI8, or Military Intelligence, Section 8 was a British Military Intelligence group responsible for signals intelligence and was created in 1914. It originally consisted of four sections: MI8(a), which dealt with wireless policy; MI8(b), based at the General Post Office, dealt with commercial and trade cables; MI8(c) dealt with the distribution of intelligence derived from censorship; and MI8(d), which liaised with the cable companies. During World War I MI8 officers were posted to the cable terminals at Poldhu Point and Mullion in Cornwall and Clifden in County Galway, continued until 1917 when the work was taken over by the Admiralty. In WW2, MI8 was responsible for the extensive War Office Y Group and briefly, for the Radio Security Service.

== History ==
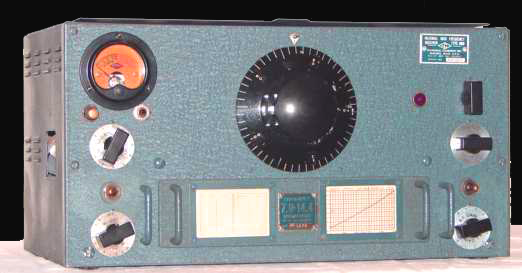
National HRO receiver, extensively used by the RSS

MI8 was the signals intelligence department of the War Office that ran a worldwide Y-stations network. Additionally, for an 18-month period, from late 1939 to mid 1941, it also ran the Radio Security Service, under the designation of MI8c, but this was quickly handed over to MI6. The remainder of this page relates only to this small organisation, with, regrettably, no information concerning the major role of MI8.

=== MI8c ===
The Radio Security Service evolved from the Illicit Wireless Intercept Organisation (IWIO), which was given the designation MI1g and run by Lt Col. J S Yule. From an office in Broadway, IWIO collaborated with Military Intelligence, Section 5 (MI5) and with the General Post Office (GPO) to set up and control a small network of Direction Finding (DF) and intercept stations, to locate illicit transmissions inside Britain.

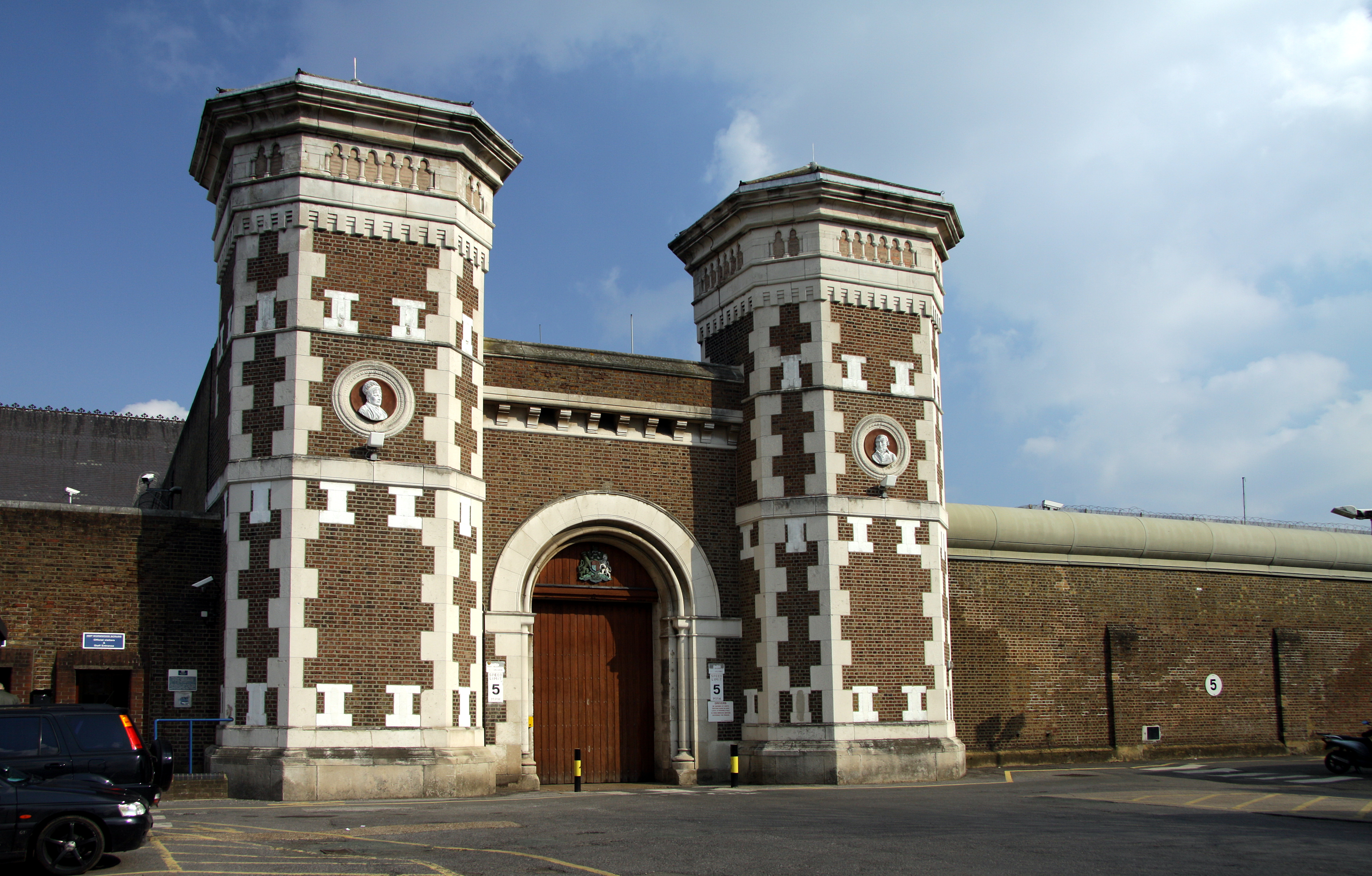
For security reasons, at the start of WWII, personnel employed in the Radio Security Service had to be housed in Wormwood Scrubs Prison

At the start of the Second World War, Vernon Kell, the head of MI5, introduced a contingency plan to deal with the problem of illicit radio transmissions. A new body was created, the Radio Security Service (RSS), headed by Major J.P.G. Worlledge. Until 1927, Worlledge had commanded a Wireless Company in Palestine. His brief was to "intercept, locate and close down illicit wireless stations operated either by enemy agents in Great Britain or by other persons not being licensed to do so under Defence Regulations, 1939".

Working from cells at HM Prison Wormwood Scrubs, Worlledge selected Majors Sclater and Cole-Adams as his assistants, and E.W.B. Gill as his chief traffic analyst. Gill had been engaged in wireless interception in the First World War and decided that the best course of action would be to find the transmissions of the agent control stations in Germany. He recruited a research fellow from Oxford, Hugh Trevor-Roper, who was fluent in German. Working with them, at Wormwood Scrubs, was John Masterman, who ran MI5's Double Cross System. Masterman already had Agent SNOW, and Gill used his codes as the basis for decrypting incoming agent traffic.

RSS assigned the task of developing a comprehensive listening organisation to Ralph Mansfield, 4th Baron Sandhurst. Sandhurst was an enthusiastic amateur radio operator. He had served with the Royal Engineers Signal Service during the First World War and had been commissioned as a major in the Royal Corps of Signals in 1939.

Sandhurst was given an office in the Security Service's temporary accommodation in Wormwood Scrubs. He began by approaching the President of the Radio Society of Great Britain (RSGB), Arthur Watts. Watts had served as an analyst in Room 40 during the First World War, following the loss of a leg at Gallipoli. Watts recommended that Sandhurst recruit the entire RSGB Council and he did. The RSGB Council then began to recruit the society's members as Voluntary Interceptors (VIs). Radio amateurs were considered ideal for such work because they were widely distributed across the United Kingdom.

The VIs were mostly working men of non-military age, working in their own time and using their own equipment (their transmitters had been impounded on the outbreak of war, but their receivers had not). They were ordered to ignore commercial and military traffic, to concentrate on more elusive transmissions. Each VI was given a minimum number of intercepts to make each month. Reaching that number gave them exemption from other duties, such as fire watching. Also, many VIs were issued a special DR12 identity card. This allowed them to enter premises which they suspected to be the transmission source of unauthorised signals. RSS also established a series of Radio Direction Finding stations, in the far corners of the British Isles, to identify the locations of the intercepted transmissions.

The recruitment of Voluntary Interceptors (VIs) was slow, since they had to be skilled, discreet, and dedicated, within three months, 50 VIs were at work and had identified over 600 transmitters - all firmly on the other side of the English Channel. It became apparent that there were no enemy agents transmitting from Britain. All German agents entering the country were captured and either interned or "turned" to operate as double agents under the supervision of the XX Committee. In some cases, a British operator took over their transmissions, impersonating them. The German military did not realise this. By May 1940, it was clear that RSS's initial mission - to locate enemy agents in Britain - was complete.

=== Arkley View ===
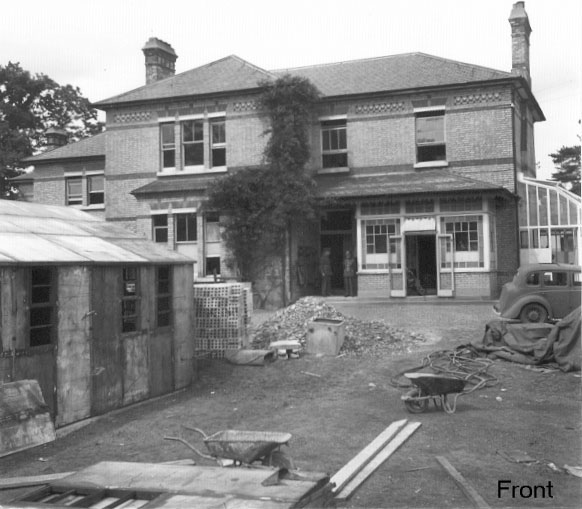
Arkley View, 1943

Initially, messages logged by VIs were sent to Wormwood Scrubs. However, as the volume became great and as Wormwood began to suffer from German air attacks, RSS was in need of larger premises and chose Arkley View, a large country house near the village of Arkley, in Hertfordshire, which had already been requisitioned as an intercept station. It was given the cryptic postal address of Box 25, Barnet. There, a staff of analysts and cryptographers began their duties.

=== MI6 takeover ===
RSS had in effect become the civilian counterpart of the military's "Y Service" intercept network. By mid-1941, up to 10,000 logs (message sheets) a day were being sent to Arkley, then forwarded to the code-breaking centre at Bletchley Park. In May 1941, RSS's success and the fact that some of its personnel had managed to decode some Abwehr cyphers ahead of Bletchley, caused control of the organisation to be transferred. There was brief conflict over who would control it. In the end, it became the communication and interception service of MI6. Previously, MI6 had possessed no such capability.

The new controller of RSS was Lieutenant-Colonel E.F. Maltby. From 1942, Lt. Col. Kenneth Morton Evans was appointed Deputy Controller. Roland Keen, author of Wireless Direction Finding, was the officer in charge of engineering. The service was well-financed. It was equipped with a new central radio station at Hanslope Park in Buckinghamshire (the Special Communications Unit No.3 or SCU3). The Abwehr was now monitored around the clock. The volume and regularity of the material obtained, enabled Bletchley to achieve one of its great triumphs in December 1941, when it decoded the Abwehr's Enigma cypher, giving enormous insight into German intelligence operations.

At its peak in 1943–1944, RSS employed – apart from VIs – more than 1,500 personnel, most of whom had been amateur radio operators. Over half of these worked as interceptors while the others investigated the numerous enemy radio networks. This revealed important information, even when it was not possible to decode messages. Few transmissions by secret agents of German Intelligence evaded RSS' notice. Changes in procedure, which the Germans used for security, were in many cases identified before the enemy had become familiar with them. Following the end of the war, RSS HQ moved to Eastcote and was absorbed by the Government Communications Headquarters (GCHQ).

== Bibliography ==
- Abrutat, David (2019). Radio War: The Secret Espionage War of the Radio Security Service 1938–1946. Stroud: Fonthill Media Ltd. ISBN 978-1-78155-759-4.
