= Richard Parker, 9th Earl of Macclesfield =

British peer

The Right Honourable The Earl of Macclesfield

Member of the House of Lords
- Lord Temporal
- In office 7 December 1992 – 11 November 1999 as a hereditary peer
- Preceded by: The 8th Earl of Macclesfield
- Succeeded by: Seat abolished (Note: Pursuant to the House of Lords Act 1999.)

Personal details
- Born: Richard Timothy George Mansfield Parker; 31 May 1943 (age 83)
- Party: Crossbench
- Spouse(s): Tatiana Cleone Anne Wheaton-Smith (m. 1967; div. 1985) Sandra Hope Fiore (after 1986)
- Parent(s): George Parker, 8th Earl of Macclesfield; Valerie Mansfield

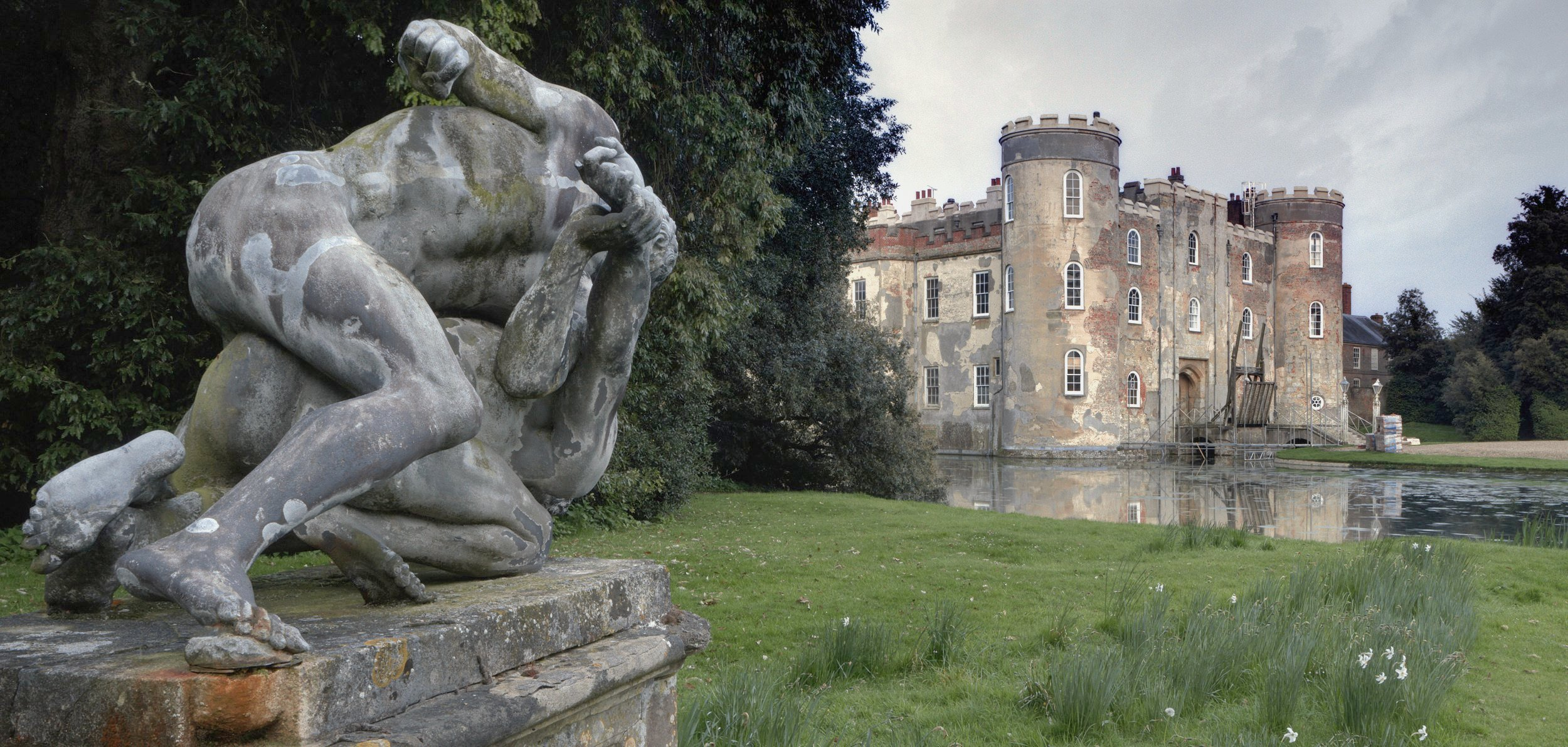
Shirburn Castle

Richard Timothy George Mansfield Parker, 9th Earl of Macclesfield (born 31 May 1943), is a British hereditary peer. He was a member of the House of Lords from 1992 until 1999.

== Early life ==
The son of George Parker, 8th Earl of Macclesfield, and his wife Valerie Mansfield, he was educated at Stowe School and Worcester College, Oxford.

== Career ==
On 7 December 1992 he succeeded his father in his titles.

=== Shirburn Castle ===
Macclesfield was the last of the Parker family to live at Shirburn Castle, from which he was evicted in 2005 by other members of a family company which owned the property. They contended in court that he was "no more than tenant at will". However, the contents of the castle had been given to Macclesfield in 1967 by his grandfather, including three important libraries.

Macclesfield then decided to sell the libraries and some other items from the castle, including the Macclesfield Psalter, now in the Fitzwilliam Museum, and the Macclesfield Alphabet Book, now in the British Library. The receipts came to more than £16 million, "the highest total ever for any sale of scientific books and manuscripts". A painting by George Stubbs, "Brood Mares and Foals", was sold at auction in 2010 for £10,121,250, a record price for Stubbs.

== Personal life ==
On 11 August 1967 he married firstly Tatiana Cleone Anne Wheaton-Smith, daughter of Major Craig Wheaton-Smith. They were divorced in 1985, and in 1986 he married Sandra Hope Fiore. By his first wife he has three daughters:

- Lady Tanya Susan (born 1971)
- Lady Katharine Anne (born 1973)
- Lady Marion Jane (born 1973)

As he has no son, the heir presumptive is his younger brother, the Hon. (Jonathan) David Geoffrey Parker (born 1945).

In 2018, Macclesfield's daughter Tanya joined a legal challenge to the general rule of male primogeniture, asking the European Court of Human Rights to find it contrary to Article 14 of the European Convention on Human Rights.

== Notes ==
Peerage of Great Britain
Preceded by George Parker	Earl of Macclesfield; 1992–present Member of the House of Lords (1992–1999)	Incumbent; Heir presumptive: Hon. David Parker
Preceded by George Parker	Baron Parker; 1992–present	Incumbent; Heir presumptive: Hon. David Parker
