= John Henry Le Keux =

English draughtsman and architectural engraver

John Henry Le Keux (23 March 1812 – 4 February 1896) was an English architectural engraver and draughtsman.

== Life ==
The son of John Le Keux, he was born in Argyll Street, Euston Road, London, on 23 March 1812, and studied under James Basire III. He then worked for a time as assistant to his father.

Between 1853 and 1865 Le Keux exhibited architectural drawings at the Royal Academy. About 1864 he moved to Durham, and acted as manager to Messrs. Andrews, a firm of publishers with which his wife was connected. He died at Durham on 4 February 1896, and was buried in St Nicholas' Church.

== Works ==
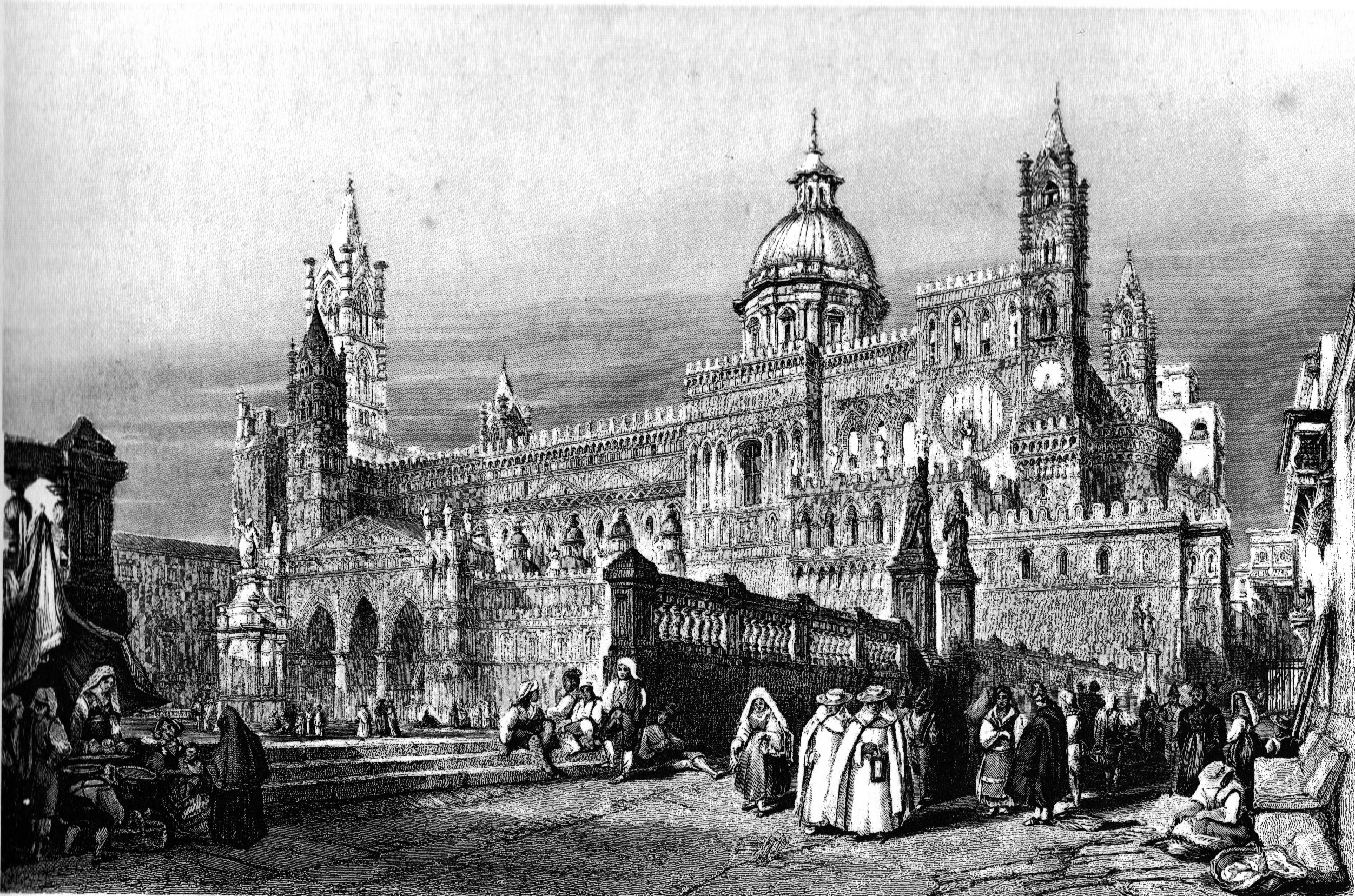
Palermo Cathedral, engraving by John Henry Le Keux after William Leighton Leitch

Le Keux engraved plates for architectural works, including:

- John Ruskin, Modern Painters and The Stones of Venice;
- John Weale, Studies and Examples of English Architecture, Travellers' Club, 1839;
- Charles Henry Hartshorne, Illustrations of Alnwick, Prudhoe, and Warkworth, 1857; and
- John Henry Parker, Mediæval Architecture of Chester, 1858.

The Norwegian government employed him to execute 31 plates of Trondheim cathedral. He contributed papers on mediæval arms and armor to the Journal of the Archæological Institute and other publications. His last work was the Oxford Almanack for 1870.
