= George Parker, 8th Earl of Macclesfield =

George Roger Alexander Thomas Parker, 8th Earl of Macclesfield (6 May 1914 – 7 December 1992), of Shirburn Castle, Oxfordshire, was a British peer and landowner. He was a member of the House of Lords from 1975 until his death.

The son of George Parker, 7th Earl of Macclesfield, and his wife Lilian Joanna Vere Boyle, a daughter of Major Charles Boyle, of Great Milton, Oxfordshire, he was educated at Stowe School. In the Second World War, he was commissioned into the Royal Naval Volunteer Reserve.

In 1955, he was appointed as a Justice of the Peace for Oxfordshire and in 1965 as a Deputy Lieutenant for the county. In 1975 he succeeded his father as Earl of Macclesfield, as Viscount Parker of Ewelm, and as Baron Parker of Macclesfield.

On 18 June 1938, he married Valerie Mansfield, daughter of Ralph Mansfield, 4th Baron Sandhurst. They had two sons:

- Richard Timothy George Mansfield Parker, 9th Earl of Macclesfield (born 1943)
- Jonathon David Geoffrey Parker (born 1945).

== Arms ==
Arms of the Earl of Macclesfield

The arms of the head of the family are blazoned: Gules, a chevron between three leopard's faces or.

== Notes ==
Peerage of Great Britain
Preceded by George Parker	Earl of Macclesfield; 1975–1992	Succeeded by Richard Parker
