= Ralph Mansfield, 4th Baron Sandhurst =

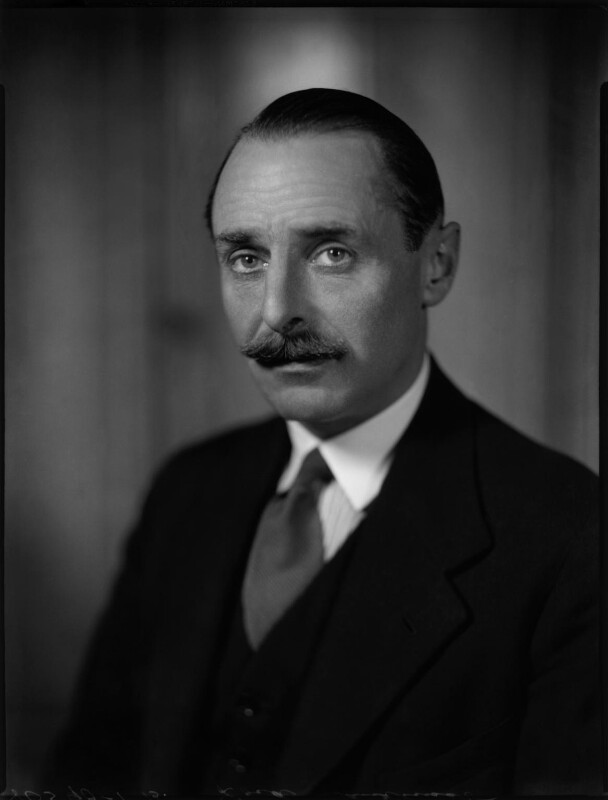
Mansfield in 1935

Ralph Sheldon Mansfield, 4th Baron Sandhurst, OBE (19 July 1892 – 1964) was an English nobleman. Mansfield became 4th Baron Sandhurst upon the death of his father, John William Mansfield, the 3rd Baron Sandhurst, in 1933.

== Biography ==
He was educated at Winchester College and Trinity College, Cambridge.

=== Military service ===
During World War I he served with the Royal Engineers Signal Service, and was appointed an Officer of the Order of the British Empire in 1918. In 1939 he was commissioned as a Major in the Royal Corps of Signals in 1939 and worked for MI8.

== Family ==
He married Morley Victoria Upcher (died 17 June 1961), daughter of Edward Berners Upcher, on 8 February 1917. They had three children:

- Valerie Mansfield (25 December 1918 - 3 August 1994), who in 1938 married George Parker, Viscount Parker
- John Edward Terence Mansfield, 5th Baron Sandhurst (born 4 September 1920)
- Ralph Geoffrey Knyvet Mansfield (born 8 November 1926)

== Arms ==
Coat of arms of Ralph Mansfield, 4th Baron Sandhurst

Crest
Out of an Eastern crown Argent a gryphon’s head Sable beaked Or between two branches of laurel Proper.
Escutcheon
Argent on a chevron embattled Azure between three maunches Sable an Eastern crown Or on a chief engrailed of the third a lion of the fourth combatant with a tiger cowed Proper.
Motto
Steadfast

Peerage of the United Kingdom
Preceded by John William Mansfield	Baron Sandhurst; 1933–1964	Succeeded by John Edward Terence Mansfield
