= John Le Keux =

British engraver (1783–1846)

John Le Keux (4 June 1783 – 2 April 1846) was a British engraver.

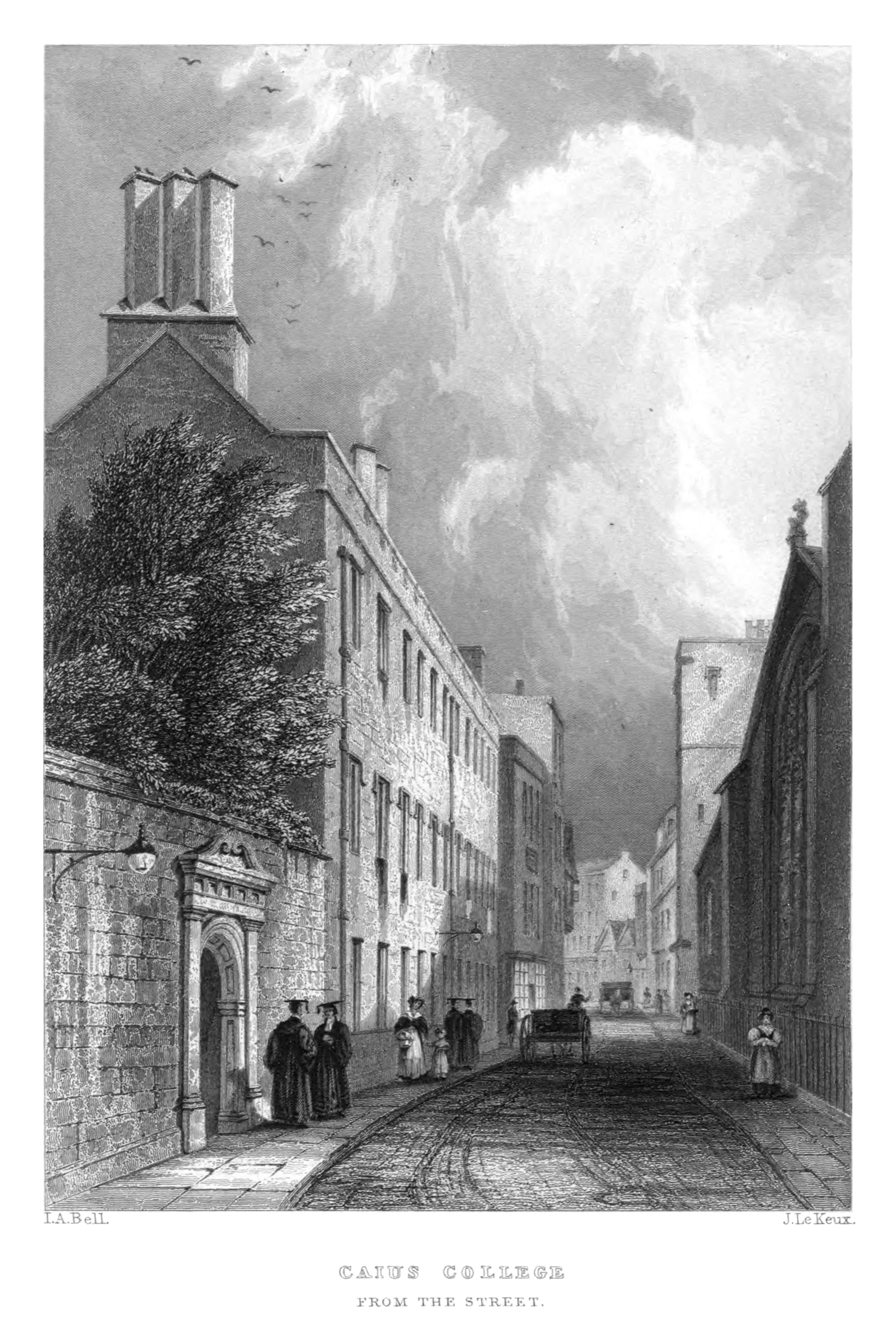
John Le Keux, engraved view of Gonville and Caius College, Cambridge from the street, after Jonathan Anderson Bell

== Life ==
Born in Sun Street, Bishopsgate, London, on 4 June 1783, and baptised at St. Botolph, Bishopsgate, in September of that year, he was son of Peter Le Keux and Anne Dyer, his wife. The engraver Henry Le Keux (1787–1868), was his younger brother. His father, a wholesale pewter manufacturer in Bishopsgate, was from a Huguenot family.

Le Keux was apprenticed to his father, but tried out engraving on pewter. He turned his attention to copperplate engraving, and was transferred for the remaining years of his apprenticeship to James Basire, to whom his brother Henry had been apprenticed. Under Basire he became a stylish line engraver.

== Works ==
Le Keux's engravings were found in the architectural publications of John Britton, Augustus Welby Pugin, John Preston Neale, and others; they were an influence in the revival of Gothic architecture. He engraved the plates to James Ingram's Memorials of Oxford, and published himself two volumes of engravings, Memorials of Cambridge, with text by Thomas Wright and Harry Longueville Jones; some of these plates were subsequently used for Charles Henry Cooper's Memorials of Cambridge. He engraved, after J. M. W. Turner, Rome from the Farnese Gardens for James Hakewill's Italy, and St. Agatha's Abbey, Easby, for Thomas Dunham Whitaker's History of Richmondshire.

== Family ==
Le Keux married, on 27 September 1809, at St. Mary's, Lambeth, Sarah Sophia (1836–1871), daughter of John Lingard, by whom he was father of John Henry Le Keux (b. 1813), also an engraver. Le Keux died on 2 April 1846, and was buried in Bunhill Fields cemetery.
