= Earl of Macclesfield =

Earldom in the Peerage of Great Britain

- Arms of Parker, Earl of Macclesfield: Gules, a chevron between three leopard's faces, or
- Creation date: 1721
- Creation: Second
- Created by: George I
- Peerage: Great Britain
- First holder: Charles Gerard, 1st Earl of Macclesfield
- Present holder: Richard Parker, 9th Earl of Macclesfield
- Heir presumptive: Hon. (Jonathan) David Geoffrey Parker
- Subsidiary titles: Viscount Parker; Baron Parker of Ewelme
- Status: extant
- Seat: Shirburn Castle
- Motto: Sapere aude (Dare to be wise)

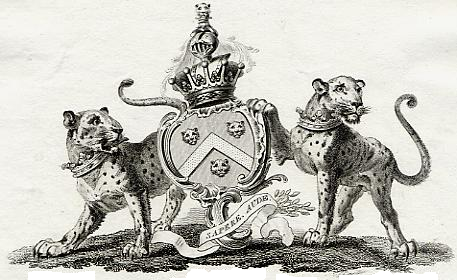
Arms of Parker, Earls of Macclesfield (second creation): Gules, a chevron between three leopard's faces or; Supporters (here shown "off-duty"): Two leopards reguardant proper ducally gorged gules; Crest: A leopard's head erased affrontée or ducally gorged gules (some tinctures shown incorrectly)

Earl of Macclesfield is a title that has been created twice. The first creation came in the Peerage of England in 1679 in favour of the soldier and politician Charles Gerard, 1st Baron Gerard. He had already been created Baron Gerard, of Brandon in the County of Suffolk, in 1645, and was made Viscount Brandon, of Brandon in the County of Suffolk, at the same time as he was given the earldom. These titles are also in the Peerage of England. Lord Macclesfield was the great-grandson of the distinguished judge Sir Gilbert Gerard, Master of the Rolls from 1581 to 1594. He was succeeded by his eldest son, the second Earl. He was involved in the Rye House Plot of 1683, was sentenced to death but later pardoned by the King. On his death without legitimate issue in 1701 the titles passed to his younger brother, the third Earl. He had earlier represented Yarmouth, Lancaster and Lancashire in the House of Commons. When he died in 1702 the titles became extinct.

William Dorington (or Dorrington), Colonel of the King's Royal Irish Regiment of Foot Guards, was created Earl of Macclesfield in the Jacobite Peerage in or about 1716. The title, such as it was, became extinct in 1841.

The second creation came in the Peerage of Great Britain in 1721 when the noted lawyer Thomas Parker, 1st Baron Parker, was made Viscount Parker, of Ewelm in the County of Oxford, and Earl of Macclesfield, in the County Palatine of Chester. He was Lord Chief Justice of the Queen's Bench from 1710 to 1718 and Lord High Chancellor of Great Britain from 1718 to 1725. Parker had already been created Lord Parker, Baron of Macclesfield, in the County Palatine of Chester, in 1716. This title is also in the Peerage of Great Britain. In contrast to the barony, the viscountcy and earldom were created with remainder, in default of male issue, to his daughter Elizabeth, wife of Sir William Heathcote, 1st Baronet of Hursley Park, and her issue male. In 1725 Lord Macclesfield was convicted of corruption and forced to pay a £30,000 fine. He was succeeded by his son George, the second Earl, who was a distinguished astronomer and served as president of the Royal Society for many years.

On George's death the titles passed to his son Thomas, the third Earl. He had sat as Member of Parliament for Newcastle-under-Lyme, Oxfordshire and Rochester. He was succeeded by his eldest son, the fourth Earl. He was a prominent politician and served as President of the Board of Agriculture from 1816 to 1818. When he died the titles passed to his younger brother, the fifth Earl. He was succeeded by his son, the sixth Earl. He had represented Oxfordshire in the House of Commons as a Conservative. He was succeeded by his grandson, the seventh Earl. He was the son of George Augustus Parker, Viscount Parker, eldest son of the sixth Earl. Lord Macclesfield was Lord-Lieutenant of Oxfordshire from 1954 to 1963. As of 2010 the titles are held by his grandson, the ninth Earl, who succeeded his father in 1992.

Brigadier Andrew Parker Bowles, first husband of Queen Camilla, is the son of Derek Henry Parker-Bowles (who assumed his mother's maiden surname of Bowles), grandson of Reverend the Hon. Algernon Robert Parker, third son of the sixth Earl. Consequently, he is in distant remainder to the earldom and its subsidiary titles. Another member of the family was the Right Reverend Wilfrid Parker (1883–1966), son of the Hon. Cecil Thomas Parker, second son of the sixth Earl. He served as Bishop of Pretoria (1933–1950).

The family seat of the Parker family is Shirburn Castle, near Oxford, but the castle and estate is held by the Beechwood Estates Company, the Macclesfield family estate management company. Following a long-running and acrimonious court battle, the ninth Earl was evicted from the family seat at the end of 2004.

== Earl of Macclesfield, first creation ==
=== Baron Gerard (1645) ===
- Charles Gerard, 1st Baron Gerard (1618–1694) (created Earl of Macclesfield in 1679)

=== Earl of Macclesfield (1679) ===
- Charles Gerard, 1st Earl of Macclesfield (1618–1694)
- Charles Gerard, 2nd Earl of Macclesfield (1659–1701)
- Fitton Gerard, 3rd Earl of Macclesfield (1665–1702)

== Earl of Macclesfield, second creation ==
=== Baron Parker (1716) ===
- Thomas Parker, 1st Baron Parker (1667–1732) (created Earl of Macclesfield in 1721)

=== Earl of Macclesfield (1721) ===
- Thomas Parker, 1st Earl of Macclesfield (1667–1732)
- George Parker, 2nd Earl of Macclesfield (c. 1697–1764)
- Thomas Parker, 3rd Earl of Macclesfield (1723–1795)
- George Parker, 4th Earl of Macclesfield (1755–1842)
- Thomas Parker, 5th Earl of Macclesfield (1763–1850)
- Thomas Augustus Wolstenholme Parker, 6th Earl of Macclesfield (1811–1896)
  - George Augustus Parker, Viscount Parker (1843–1895)
- George Loveden William Henry Parker, 7th Earl of Macclesfield (1888–1975)
- George Roger Alexander Thomas Parker, 8th Earl of Macclesfield (1914–1992)
- Richard Timothy George Mansfield Parker, 9th Earl of Macclesfield (b. 1943)

The heir presumptive is the present holder's younger brother, the Hon. (Jonathan) David Geoffrey Parker (b. 1945)
The heir presumptive's heir apparent is his son, Timothy George Parker (b. 1969)

Line of succession
- Thomas Parker, 1st Earl of Macclesfield (1667–1732)
  - George Parker, 2nd Earl of Macclesfield (c. 1697–1764)
    - Thomas Parker, 3rd Earl of Macclesfield (1723–1795)
      - George Parker, 4th Earl of Macclesfield (1755–1842)
      - Thomas Parker, 5th Earl of Macclesfield (1763–1850)
        - Thomas Parker, 6th Earl of Macclesfield (1811–1896)
          - George Parker, Viscount Parker (1843–1895)
            - George Parker, 7th Earl of Macclesfield (1888–1975)
              - George Parker, 8th Earl of Macclesfield (1914–1992)
                - Richard Parker, 9th Earl of Macclesfield (b. 1943)
                - (1) Jonathon David Geoffrey Parker (b. 1945)
                  - (2) Timothy George Parker (b. 1969)
              - Hon. Jocelyn Parker (1920–2009)
                - (3) Robert Parker (b. 1955)
          - Rev. Hon. Algernon Parker (1849–1940)
            - Robert Parker (1878–1942)
              - Alexander Parker (1910–1991)
                - (4) Patrick Parker (b. 1956)
              - Michael Parker (1916–1996)
                - (5) Timothy Parker (b. 1944)
                - (6) Alexander Parker (b. 1950)
                  - (7) Benjamin Parker (b. 1980)
                  - (8) David Parker (b. 1982)
            - Eustace Parker Bowles (1884–1952)
              - Derek Parker Bowles (1915–1977)
                - (9) Andrew Parker Bowles (b. 1939) first husband of Queen Camilla.
                  - (10) Tom Parker Bowles (b. 1974) son of Andrew Parker Bowles and Queen Camilla and also stepson of King Charles III and stepbrother of William, Prince of Wales, and Prince Harry, Duke of Sussex.
                    - (11) Frederick Parker Bowles (b. 2010)
                - (12) Simon Parker Bowles (b. 1944)
                  - (13) Luke Parker Bowles (b. 1974)
                    - (14) Oliver Parker Bowles (b. 2011)
                  - (15) Sam Parker Bowles (b. 1981)
          - Hon. Francis Parker (1851–1931)
            - Oliver Parker (1891–1968)
              - Timothy Parker (1924–1995)
                - (16) Oliver Parker (b. 1953)
                - (17) Michael Parker (b. 1955)
                  - (18) Thomas Parker (b. 1992)
          - Rev. Hon. Archibald Parker (1859–1931)
            - Rev. Frederick Parker (1894–1977)
              - Archibald Parker (1928–1984)
                - (19) Philip Parker (b. 1955)
                  - (20) Archie Parker (b. 1987)
                  - (21) Edward Parker (b. 2007)
          - Hon. Henry Parker (1860–1952)
            - Major Peter Parker (1918–2011)
              - (22) Henry Parker (b. 1957)
                - (23) Redvers Parker (b. 1992)
          - Hon. Alexander Parker (1864–1958)
            - Sidney Parker (1899–1969)
              - (24) David Parker (b. 1943)
                - (25) Christopher Parker (b. 1976)
                - (26) Charles Parker (b. 1977)

== Ancestry ==
Ancestors of Earl of Macclesfield

8. George Parker, Viscount Parker
4. George Parker, 7th Earl of Macclesfield
9. Carine Loveden
2. George Parker, 8th Earl of Macclesfield
10. Charles Boyle
5. Lilian Boyle
11. Lillian Pochin
1. Richard Parker, 9th Earl of Macclesfield
12. John Mansfield, 3rd Baron Sandhurst
6. Ralph Mansfield, 4th Baron Sandhurst
13. Edith Higson
3. Hon. Valerie Mansfield
14. Edward Upcher
7. Morley Upcher

== See also ==
- Heathcote baronets, of Hursley
