= John Preston Neale =

English architectural and landscape draughtsman

John Preston Neale (1780–1847) was an English architectural and landscape draughtsman. Much of his work was drawn, although he produced the occasional watercolour or oil painting. His drawings were used on a regular basis by engravers. A major work, the Views of the seats, Mansions, Castles, etc. of Noblemen and Gentlemen in England, Wales, Scotland and Ireland was published in 6 volumes between 1819 and 1823.

== Biography ==
Neale's earliest works were drawings of insects. While in search of specimens in Hornsey Wood in the spring of 1796, Neale met John Varley the water-colour painter. Together they projected a work to be entitled The Picturesque Cabinet of Nature, for which Varley was to make the landscape drawings, and Neale was to etch and colour the plates. No. 1 was published on 1 September 1796, but no more appeared.

Neale was a clerk in the General Post Office, but eventually resigned his appointment to devote his time to art. Neale died at Tattingstone, near Ipswich, aged 67, on 14 November 1847.

== Works ==
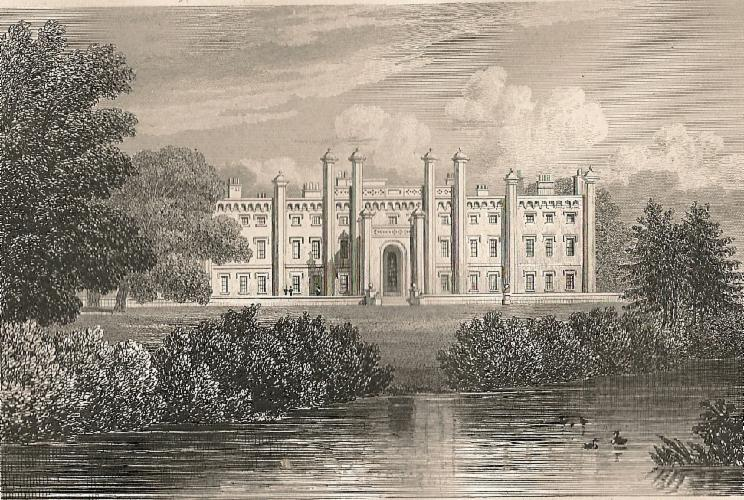
Neale's drawing of Ashburnham Place, Sussex (1828)

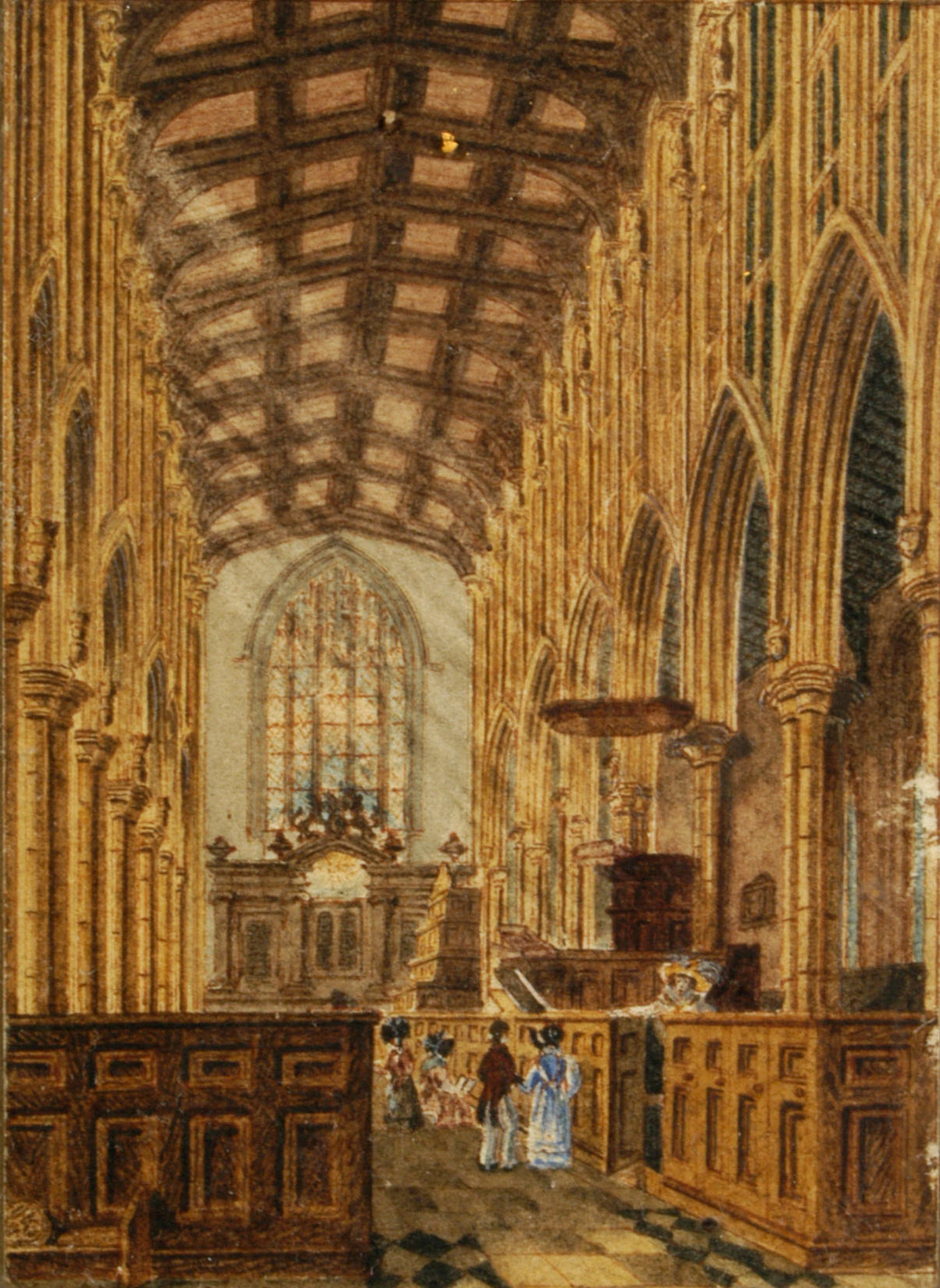
Melford church interior

In 1797 Neale exhibited at the Royal Academy two drawings of insects, and sent others in 1799, 1801, and 1803. In 1804 he sent to the Royal Academy a drawing of the Custom House, Dover, and continued to exhibit topographical drawings and landscapes until 1844. He contributed also to the exhibitions of the Society of Painters in Oil and Water Colours in 1817 and 1818, and from time to time to those of the British Institution and of the Society of British Artists.

Some of his works were in oil-colours; but he is best known for his architectural drawings, which are executed in pen and tinted with water-colours. In 1816 he began the publication of the History and Antiquities of the Abbey Church of St Peter, Westminster which was completed in 1823, in two quarto volumes, with descriptive text by Edward Wedlake Brayley. He next began, in 1818, his Views of the Seats of Noblemen and Gentlemen in England, Wales, Scotland, and Ireland, of which the first series, in six volumes, was completed in 1824. The second series, in five volumes, was published between 1824 and 1829, and the entire work comprised 732 plates.

He also in 1824–5 undertook, in collaboration with John Le Keux, the engraver, the publication of Views of the most interesting Collegiate and Parochial Churches in Great Britain, but the work was discontinued after the issue of the second volume. Besides these works he published Six Views of Blenheim, Oxfordshire, (1823); Graphical Illustrations of Fonthill Abbey, (1824); and An Account of the Deep-Dene in Surrey, the seat of Thomas Hope, Esq., (1826). Many other works contain his pen and pencil illustrations.
