= Henry Glassford Bell =

Scottish lawyer, poet and historian (1803–1874)

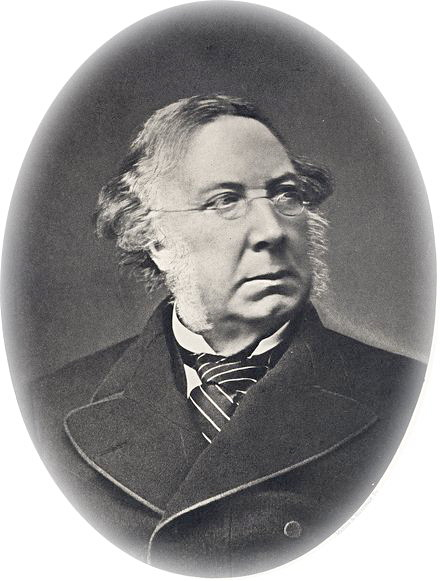
- Photographic portrait, by Thomas Annan
- Born: 5 November 1803; Glasgow, Lanarkshire, Scotland
- Died: 7 January 1874 (aged 70)
- Occupations: lawyer, poet and historian

Henry Glassford Bell (5 November 1803 – 7 January 1874) was a Scottish lawyer, poet and historian.

== Life ==
Born in Glasgow, the son of advocate James Bell, he received his education at the Glasgow High School and at Edinburgh University.

As a poet, he became intimate with Delta Moir, James Hogg, John Wilson (Christopher North), and others on the staff of Blackwood's Magazine, to which he was drawn by his political sympathies. In 1828 he became editor of the Edinburgh Literary Journal, which was eventually incorporated in the Edinburgh Weekly Chronicle.

In 1831 he published Summer and Winter Hours, a volume of poems, of which the best known is that on Mary, Queen of Scots. He further defended the cause of the queen in a prose Life (2 vols, 1828–1831). Among his other works may be mentioned a preface which he wrote to Bell and Bains's edition (1865) of the works of Shakespeare, and Romances and Minor Poems (1866). He figures in the society of the Noctes Ambrosianae as "Tallboys."

He was a qualified advocate and was admitted to the bar in 1832. In 1839 he was appointed sheriff-substitute of Lanarkshire, and in 1867 succeeded Sir Archibald Alison to the post of sheriff of the county, an office which he filled with distinguished success until his death in 1874.

== Works ==
=== Fiction ===
- Poems. 1824. Privately printed. iv+63pp. A. Balfour & Co.: Edinburgh.
- The Rainbow, or Tales and sketches. 1830. Smith & Co.: London. iv+310pp Reprinted in 1832 as My Old Portfolio.
- Summer and Winter Hours. 1831. . Hurst, Chance & Co.: London;
- Romances and minor poems. 1866. London : Macmillan. x+214pp.

=== Miscellaneous works ===
- Selection from the most remarkable phenomena of nature. 1827. Edinburgh : Constable. Constable's Miscellany, vol. 12. 324pp.
- Life of Mary Queen of Scots. 1828 and 1830. Edinburgh: Constable. Constable's Miscellany. Volumes. 24 and 25. 2 volumes xxiv+318pp, vi+360pp.
- Introductory address, delivered by Henry Glassford Bell, Esq., Advocate and Sheriff-Substitute of Lanarkshire, on the 18th October, 1850, to the Glasgow Juridical Society. 1850. Glasgow : John Smith & Son. 34pp.
- On the Bankruptcy Law of England and Scotland 1860. James Maclehose: Glasgow. 8vo. 39pp.

=== Works as Editor ===
- The Poetical Works of David Gray. A new and enlarged edition by H.G.Bell. 1874. Glasgow: James Maclehose. xii+212pp
- Legal Lyrics or Metrical Illustrations of the Laws of Scotland. By Quizdom Rumfunidos. e.g. George Outram. 1874. Privately printed. 8 poems. 32pp. Edited with an introduction by the Late Henry Glassford Bell. The 1855 and 1871 editions are not edited by Bell and do not have his introduction.
