= Psalm 1 =

First psalm of the Book of Psalms

- "Blessed is the man"
- Large historiated Beatus initial from the Rheinau Psalter, c. 1260
- Other name: Psalm 1 (Vulgate); "Beatus vir"
- Language: Hebrew (original)

Psalm 1
- Psalm 2 →
- Book: Book of Psalms
- Hebrew Bible part: Ketuvim
- Order in the Hebrew part: 1
- Category: Sifrei Emet
- Christian Bible part: Old Testament
- Order in the Christian part: 19

Psalm 1 is the first psalm of the Book of Psalms, beginning in the English King James Version with "Blessed is the man"; Alexander Kirkpatrick argued that it formed "an appropriate prologue" to the whole collection. The Book of Psalms is part of the third section of the Hebrew Bible. It is also a book of the Christian Old Testament. In Latin, the psalm is known as "Beatus vir" or "Beatus vir, qui non abiit".

The psalm is a regular part of the Jewish liturgy as well as the liturgies of the Catholic Church and Lutheran, Anglican, and other Protestant forms of Christianity.

== Numbering ==
The Book of Psalms is subdivided into five parts. Psalm 1 is found in the first part, which includes psalms 1 through 41. It has been counted as the beginning of part one in some translations, in some counted as a prologue, and in others Psalm 1 is combined with Psalm 2.

== Background and themes ==
Beatus vir, "Blessed is the man ..." in Latin, are the first words in the Vulgate Bible of both Psalm 1 and Psalm 112 (111). In illuminated manuscript psalters, the start of the main psalm text was traditionally marked by a large Beatus initial for the "B" of "Beatus", and the two opening words are often much larger than the rest of the text. Between them, these often take up a whole page. Beatus initials have been significant in the development of manuscript painting, as the location of several developments in the use of initials as the focus of painting.

Patrick D. Miller suggests that Psalm 1 "sets the agenda for the Psalter through its "identification of the way of the righteous and the way of the wicked as well as their respective fates" along with "its emphasis on the Torah, the joy of studying it and its positive benefits for those who do". Stephen Dempster suggests that the psalm serves as an introduction to the Ketuvim (Writings), the third section of the Tanakh. Dempster points out the similarities between Psalm 1:2–3 and Joshua 1:8, the first chapter of the Nevi'im (Prophets), in both passages—the one who meditates on the Law (Biblical Hebrew: סֵפֶר הַתּוֹרָה, romanized: Sefer HaTorah) prospers:

This Book of the Law shall not depart from your mouth, but you shall meditate in it day and night, that you may observe to do according to all that is written in it. For then you will make your way prosperous, and then you will have good success.

Like many of the psalms, it contrasts the "righteous" person (tzadik צדיק) with the "wicked" or "ungodly" (rasha רשע) or the "sinner" (chatta' חטא). A righteous person carefully learns the laws of God, which gives them good judgment and helps them avoid bad company. As a result, they can endure tough times supported by God's grace and protection. On the other hand, the wicked person's behavior makes them vulnerable to disaster, like chaff blowing away in the wind. The point that the wicked and the righteous will not mingle at the day of judgment is clearly stated by the writer. The path the wicked have chosen leads to destruction, and at the judgment, they receive the natural consequences of that choice.

The righteous person is compared in verse 3 to a tree planted beside a stream. Their harvest is plentiful, and whatever they do prospers. The prophet Jeremiah is recorded sharing a similar message in Jeremiah 17:7–8—namely of the advantage in facing difficult times if one trusts in God:

Blessed is the man who trusts in the LORD, whose trust is in God alone. He shall be like a tree planted by waters, sending forth its roots by a stream: It does not sense the coming of heat, its leaves are ever fresh; of has no care in a year of drought, it does not cease to yield fruit.

Bible scholar Alexander Kirkpatrick suggests that the "judgment" referred to in verse 5 pertains not only to the "last judgment"—"as the Targum and many interpreters understand it"—but also to every act of divine judgment.

In The Flow of the Psalms, Christian O. Palmer Robertson examines thematic pairings of divine law and the Messiah, notably emphasizing the law in Psalm 1 alongside the anointed (i.e., the Messiah) in Psalm 2. Similar intentional pairings are observed with Psalms 18 and 19, as well as Psalms 118 and 119 .

== Text ==
The following table shows the Hebrew text of the Psalm with vowels and cantillation marks, alongside the English translation from the King James Version, the Latin text in the Vulgate and the Koine Greek text in the Septuagint. Note that the meaning can slightly differ between these versions, as the Septuagint and the Masoretic Text come from different textual traditions. (Note: A 1917 translation directly from Hebrew to English by the Jewish Publication Society can be found or here or here (without cantillation marks), and an 1844 translation directly from the Septuagint by L. C. L. Brenton can be found here. Both translations are in the public domain.)

#	Hebrew	English	Latin	Greek
1	אַ֥שְֽׁרֵי הָאִ֗ישׁ אֲשֶׁ֤ר ׀ לֹ֥א הָלַךְ֮ בַּעֲצַ֢ת רְשָׁ֫עִ֥ים וּבְדֶ֣רֶךְ חַ֭טָּאִים לֹ֥א עָמָ֑ד וּבְמוֹשַׁ֥ב לֵ֝צִ֗ים לֹ֣א יָשָֽׁב׃	Blessed is the man that walketh not in the counsel of the ungodly, nor standeth in the way of sinners, nor sitteth in the seat of the scornful.	Beatus vir, qui non abiit in consilio impiorum, et in via peccatorum non stetit, et in cathedra pestilentiæ non sedit:	Μακάριος ἀνήρ, ὃς οὐκ ἐπορεύθη ἐν βουλῇ ἀσεβῶν καὶ ἐν ὁδῷ ἁμαρτωλῶν οὐκ ἔστη καὶ ἐπὶ καθέδραν λοιμῶν οὐκ ἐκάθισεν,
2	כִּ֤י אִ֥ם בְּתוֹרַ֥ת יְהֹוָ֗ה חֶ֫פְצ֥וֹ וּֽבְתוֹרָת֥וֹ יֶהְגֶּ֗ה יוֹמָ֥ם וָלָֽיְלָה׃	But his delight is in the law of the LORD; and in his law doth he meditate day and night.	sed in lege Domini voluntas ejus, et in lege eius meditabitur die ac nocte.	ἀλλ' ἢ ἐν τῷ νόμῳ Κυρίου τὸ θέλημα αὐτοῦ, καὶ ἐν τῷ νόμῳ αὐτοῦ μελετήσει ἡμέρας καὶ νυκτός.
3	וְֽהָיָ֗ה כְּעֵץ֮ שָׁת֢וּל עַֽל־פַּלְגֵ֫י־מָ֥יִם אֲשֶׁ֤ר פִּרְי֨וֹ ׀ יִתֵּ֬ן בְּעִתּ֗וֹ וְעָלֵ֥הוּ לֹֽא־יִבּ֑וֹל וְכֹ֖ל אֲשֶׁר־יַעֲשֶׂ֣ה יַצְלִֽיחַ׃	And he shall be like a tree planted by the rivers of water, that bringeth forth his fruit in his season; his leaf also shall not wither; and whatsoever he doeth shall prosper.	Et erit tamquam lignum, quod plantatum est secus decursus aquarum, quod fructum suum dabit in tempore suo: Et folium ejus non defluet: et omnia quæcumque faciet, prosperabuntur.	καὶ ἔσται ὡς τὸ ξύλον τὸ πεφυτευμένον παρὰ τὰς διεξόδους τῶν ὑδάτων, ὃ τὸν καρπὸν αὐτοῦ δώσει ἐν καιρῷ αὐτοῦ καὶ τὸ φύλλον αὐτοῦ οὐκ ἀπορρυήσεται· καὶ πάντα, ὅσα ἂν ποιῇ, κατευοδωθήσεται.
4	לֹא־כֵ֥ן הָרְשָׁעִ֑ים כִּ֥י אִם־כַּ֝מֹּ֗ץ אֲֽשֶׁר־תִּדְּפֶ֥נּוּ רֽוּחַ׃	The ungodly are not so: but are like the chaff which the wind driveth away.	Non sic impii, non sic: sed tamquam pulvis, quem projicit ventus a facie terræ.	οὐχ οὕτως οἱ ἀσεβεῖς, οὐχ οὕτως, ἀλλ' ἢ ὡς ὁ χνοῦς, ὃν ἐκρίπτει ὁ ἄνεμος ἀπὸ προσώπου τῆς γῆς.
5	עַל־כֵּ֤ן ׀ לֹא־יָקֻ֣מוּ רְ֭שָׁעִים בַּמִּשְׁפָּ֑ט וְ֝חַטָּאִ֗ים בַּעֲדַ֥ת צַדִּיקִֽים׃	Therefore, the ungodly shall not stand in the judgment, nor sinners in the congregation of the righteous.	Ideo non resurgent impii in judicio: neque peccatores in concilio justorum.	διὰ τοῦτο οὐκ ἀναστήσονται ἀσεβεῖς ἐν κρίσει οὐδὲ ἁμαρτωλοὶ ἐν βουλῇ δικαίων·
6	כִּֽי־יוֹדֵ֣עַ יְ֭הֹוָה דֶּ֣רֶךְ צַדִּיקִ֑ים וְדֶ֖רֶךְ רְשָׁעִ֣ים תֹּאבֵֽד׃	For the LORD knoweth the way of the righteous: but the way of the ungodly shall perish.	Quoniam novit Dominus viam justorum: et iter impiorum peribit.	ὅτι γινώσκει Κύριος ὁδὸν δικαίων, καὶ ὁδὸς ἀσεβῶν ἀπολεῖται.

== Uses ==
=== Judaism ===
Psalms 1, 2, 3, and 4 are recited on Yom Kippur night after Maariv.

Verse 1 is quoted in the Mishnah in Pirkei Avot 3:2, wherein Rabbi Haninah ben Teradion explains that a group of people that does not exchange words of Torah is an example of the psalm's "company of scoffers". Psalm 1 is also recited to prevent a miscarriage.

In the Talmud (Berakhot 10a), it is stated that Psalm 1 and Psalm 2 were counted as one composition and David's favorite as he used the word "ashrei" ("blessed") in the opening phrase of Psalm 1 (ashrei ha′ish) and the closing phrase of Psalm 2 (ashrei kol choso vo).

=== Christianity ===
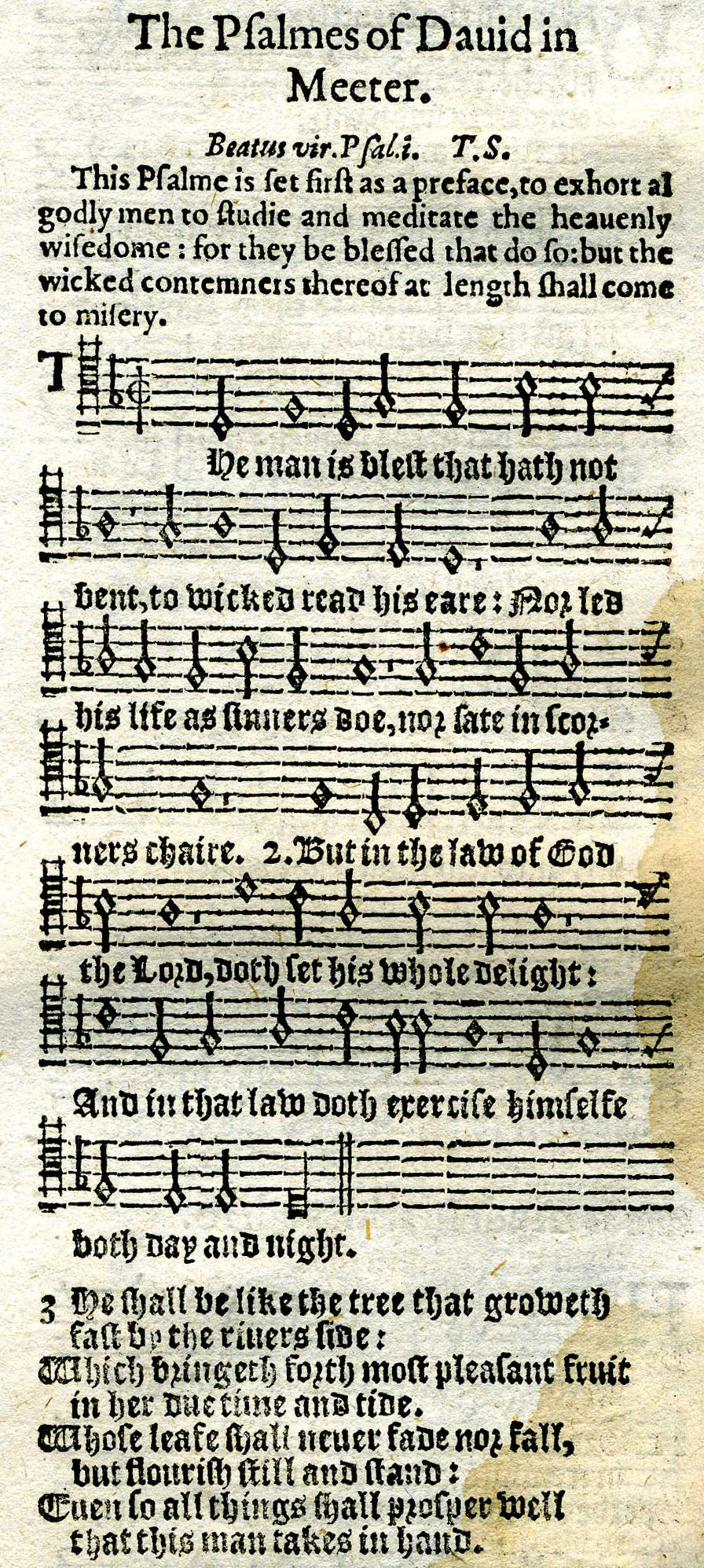
A metrical version of Psalm 1 from 1628. The melody begins on the tonic note of a natural minor scale.

In the Church of England's Book of Common Prayer, Psalm 1 is appointed to be read on the morning of the first day of the month. English poet John Milton translated Psalm 1 into English verse in 1653. Scottish poet Robert Burns wrote a paraphrase of the psalm, referring to "the man, in life wherever plac'd, ... who walks not in the wicked's way, nor learns their guilty lore!" The Presbyterian Scottish Psalter of 1650 rewords the psalm in a metrical form that can be sung to a tune set to the common meter.

Some see the Law and the work of the Messiah set side by side in Psalms 1 and 2, 18 and 19, 118 and 119. They see the law and the Messiah opening the book of Psalms.

Book 1 of the Psalms begins and ends with "the blessed man": the opening in Psalms 1–2 and the closing of Psalms 40–41. Theologian Hans Boersma notes that "beautifully structured, the first book concludes just as it started". Many see the 'blessed man being Jesus'.

In the Agpeya, the Coptic Church's book of hours, this psalm is prayed in the office of Prime.

== Musical settings ==
Thomas Tallis included Psalm 1, with the title Man blest no dout, in his nine tunes for Archbishop Parker's Psalter (1567).

Dwight L. Armstrong composed “Blest and Happy Is the Man” which appears in hymnals of the Worldwide Church of God.

Heinrich Schütz wrote a setting of a paraphrase in German, "Wer nicht sitzt im Gottlosen Rat", SWV 079, for the Becker Psalter, published first in 1628. Marc-Antoine Charpentier composed around 1670, one "Beatus vir qui non abiit", H.175, for 3 voices, 2 treble instruments and continuo.

The second movement from Sergei Rachmaninoff's All-Night Vigil is a setting of the Old Church Slavonic version of Psalm 1.

Music artist Kim Hill recorded a contemporary setting of Psalm 1.

The Psalms Project released its musical composition of Psalm 1 on the first volume of its album series in 2012.

In 2018 Jason Silver, a Christian musician and composer, released Psalm 1 set in a contemporary musical setting. This was on Volume 1 of his Love the Psalms project. He entitled it "The Two Ways".

== Cited sources ==
- Mazor, Lea (2011). "Book of Psalms". In Berlin, Adele; Grossman, Maxine (eds.). The Oxford Dictionary of the Jewish Religion. Oxford University Press. ISBN 978-0-19-973004-9.
- Scherman, Rabbi Nosson (2003). The Complete Artscroll Siddur (3rd ed.). Mesorah Publications, Ltd. ISBN 978-0-89-906650-9.
