= List of compositions by Johann Adolph Hasse =

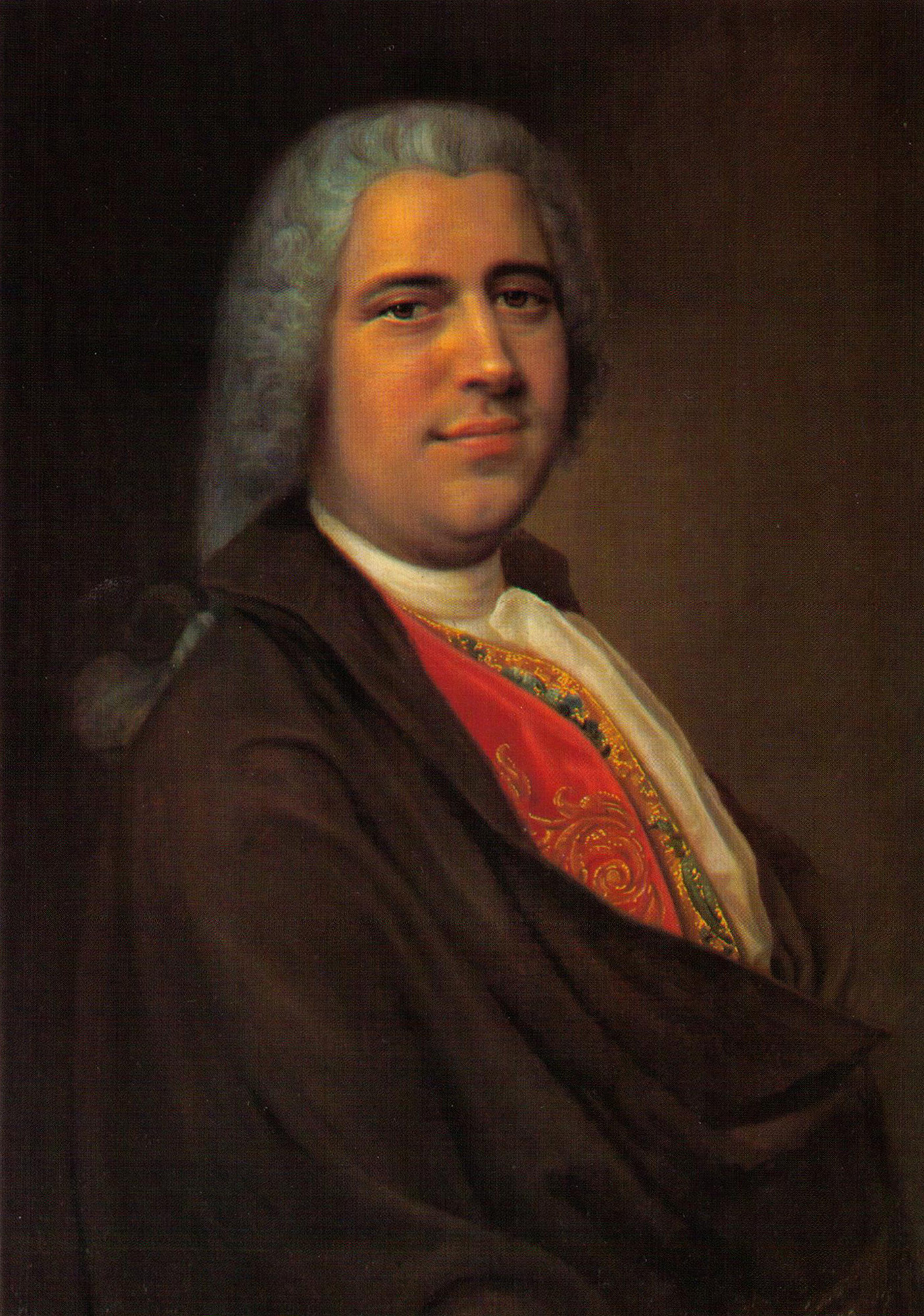
Johann Adolph Hasse in 1740, painted by Balthasar Denner

This is a list of compositions by Johann Adolph Hasse (1699–1783) sorted by genre, and then chronologically.

== Oratorios ==
- Il cantico de' tre fanciulli (The Song of the Three Holy Children) (Stefano Benedetto Pallavicino; Dresden 1734)
- Le virtù appiè della croce (Stefano Benedetto Pallavicino; Dresden 1737)
- Serpentes ignei in deserto (Bonaventura Bonomo; Venice 1740)
- Giuseppe riconosciuto (Pietro Metastasio; 1741)
- I pellegrini al sepolcro di Nostro Signore (The Pilgrims at the Tomb of Our Lord), Oratorio in 2 parts (Stefano Benedetto Pallavicino; Dresden 1742)
- Ci'l un parantê und parsol scelopgrini (Stefano Benedotto Pallavicino, 1744)
- La Caduta di Gerico (Giovanni Claudio Pasquini; Dresden 1745)
- Santa Elena al Calvario (Pietro Metastasio; 1747, second version 1772)
- La conversione di Sant' Agostino (The Conversion of Saint Augustine), Oratorio in 2 parts (Maria Antonia Walpurgis von Sachsen; Dresden 1750)
- S. Petrus et S. Maria Magdalena; Venice 1758)

== Cantatas and ballads ==
- Chieggio ai gigli ed alle rose (Pietro Metastasio; Naples 1727/1729)
- Il nome or Scrivo in te l'amato nome (Pietro Metastasio; Naples 1727/1729)
- È ver, mia Fille, è vero (Pietro Metastasio; Naples 1727/1729)
- La Scusa (Pietro Metastasio; Vienna 1761)
- Il Nome (Pietro Metastasio; Vienna 1761)
- L'Armonica or Ah perché col canto mio (with glass harmonica) (Pietro Metastasio; Vienna 1769)
- La Gelosia (Pietro Metastasio; Vienna 1769)
- Il Ciclope (Pietro Metastasio; Venice 1775/1776)
- La Danza (Pietro Metastasio; Venice 1775/1776)
- Ah, Troppo è Ver
- Bella, Mi Parto
- Bell' Aurora
- Clori, Clori, mia vita
- Euridice e Orfeo – cantata a due
- Per palesarti appieno
- Se il cantor trace, oh Dio
- Quel vago seno
- Fille dolce, mio bene
- Venetian Ballads for the German flute, violin or harpsichord (London, 1735)
  - Cosa e' sta Cossa?
  - Grazie agli inganni tuoi
  - No ste' a condanarme
  - Si', la gondola avere', no crie'

== Church music ==
- Litaniae Lauretanae in F minor
- Liltaniae Lauretanae in G major
- Magnificat in F major
- Missa in D minor (1751)
- Miserere in D minor
- Miserere in F major
- Miserere in C minor
- Missa in E♭ (1779)
- Missa ultima in G minor (Venice, 1783)
- Regina coeli in D major
- Requiem in C major (Dresden, 1763)
- Requiem in E♭ major (Dresden, 1764)
- Salve Regina in A major (1736)
- Salve Regina in E♭ major
- Salve Regina in F major
- Salve Regina in G major (1744)
- Regina Coeli in D major
- Sub tuum praesidium in B♭ major
- Sub tuum praesidium in C minor
- Te Deum in D major (1751)
- Te Deum in G major (1776)
- Venite pastores. Motetto pastorale

=== For vespers ===
- Domine ad adjuvandum me festina in C major
- Dixit Dominus (Psalm 109) in C major
- Dixit Dominus (Psalm 109) in G major
- Confitebor (Psalm 110) in F major
- Beatus vir (Psalm 111) in A minor
- Laudate pueri (Psalm 112) in A major

== Instrumental music ==
- Six sonatas for cembalo (pianoforte)
- Six trio sonatas, Op. 2, Amsterdam: Witvogel 1730, Paris: Le Clerc, n.d. (=Op. 1, c. 1735, London: John Walsh)
  - Sonata I in E minor
  - Sonata II in C major (=QV 2 Anh. 1 by Quantz)
  - Sonata III in A major
  - Sonata IV in G major
  - Sonata V in E major
  - Sonata VI in D major (=QV 2 Anh. 7 by Quantz)
- Six violin sonatas
- Six concertos for organ solo (J. Walsh, London, ca. 1743)
  - Concerto No. 1 in F major
  - Concerto No. 2 in G major
  - Concerto No. 3 in G major
  - Concerto No. 4 in D major
  - Concerto No. 5 in F major
  - Concerto No. 6 in D major
- Cello Concerto in D major
- Flute Concerto in D major
- Flute Concerto in B minor
- Concerto for Two Flutes in G major
- Oboe Concerto in F major
- Mandolin Concerto in G major
- 6 Sonatas or trios for 2 flutes or violins and continuo (London, 1739) = Op. 3, London: J. Oswald, n.d. (ca.1757).
- Solos for a German flute or violin, with a through bass for the harpsichord or violoncello, Op. 2 (London, 1740)
- 12 Concertos for flute, strings and continuo, Op. 3 (London, 1741)
- 6 Concertos for violins, French horns or oboes & c. with a thorough bass for harpsichord or violoncello in eight parts, Op. 4 (London, 1741)
- Solos for flute or violin, Op. 5 (London, 1744)
- 6 Sinfonias, Op. 5
- 6 Sonatas for harpsichord, Op. 7 (London, 1758)

== Sources ==
- Carus-Verlag critical edition of Hasse works Carus-Verlag. Accessed 30 January 2009.
