= Selva morale e spirituale =

- Collection of sacred music by Claudio Monteverdi
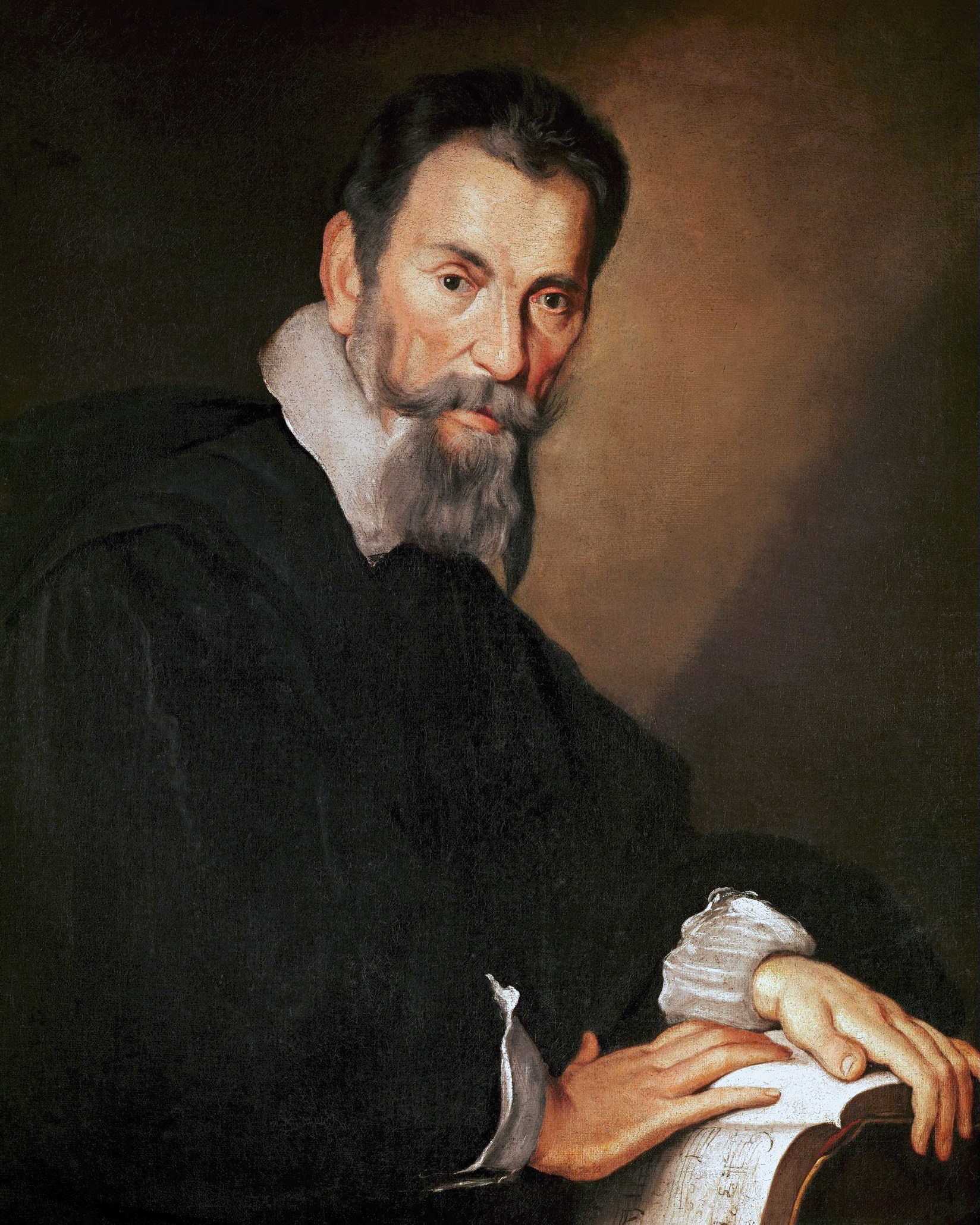
- The composer, portrayed c. 1630 by Bernardo Strozzi
- Catalogue: SV 252–288
- Language: Latin; Italian
- Published: 1640: Venice

Selva morale e spirituale (SV 252–288) is the short title of a collection of sacred music by the Italian composer Claudio Monteverdi, published in Venice in 1640 and 1641. The title translates to "Moral and Spiritual Forest". The full title is: "Selva / Morale e Spirituale / di Clavdio Monteverde / Maestro di Capella della Serenissima / Republica Di Venetia / Dedicata / alla Sacra Cesarea Maesta dell' Imperatrice / Eleonora / Gonzaga / Con Licenza de Superiori & Priuilegio. / In Venetia M DC X X X X / Appresso Bartolomeo Magni".

== History ==
Selva morale e spirituale was Monteverdi's "most significant anthology of liturgical works since the Vespers in 1610". The collection of various works in different instrumentation was published in Venice in 1640 and 1641. While the 1610 publication summarizes Monteverdi's sacred works written for Vincenzo Gonzaga, Duke of Mantua, Selva morale e spirituale presents works composed at San Marco, Venice, where Monteverdi had served since 1613. The collection was dedicated to Eleonora Gonzaga and published by Bartolomeo Magni. The date in the original title is 1640, but the process of publishing lasted until 1641. The edition is considered Monteverdi's testament of church music, compiled when he was already 74 years old.

== Content ==
The collection contains various forms of sacred music, from madrigals in Italian to a complete mass, the instrumentation varying between a single voice to eight voices with instruments:

- The first three works are moral madrigals on poems in Italian by Francesco Petrarca and Angelo Grillo.
- The mass, Messa à 4 da capella, is set in stile antico (old style) for four voices and basso continuo. It is complemented by a seven-part Gloria à 7 in stile concertato, and separate parts of the Credo, such as Crucifixus, Et resurrexit and Et iterum.
- A prominent feature of the anthology is psalms compositions, especially the ones used regularly for a vespers service such as Dixit Dominus (Psalm 110 in Hebrew numbering, Psalm 109 in Vulgate numbering), Confitebor tibi Domine (Psalm 111), Beatus Vir (Psalm 112), Laudate pueri Dominum (Psalm 113) and Laudate Dominum (Psalm 117), most of them in various settings.
- The collection also contains settings of Marian hymns such as the Magnificat in two versions, and three settings of Salve Regina. The last section contains motets for a single voice.

== Table of contents ==
Following is the original table of contents in Italian:

A

- O Ciechi il tanto affaticar Madrigale morale a 5 voci & due violini
- Voi ch'ascoltate Madrigale morale a 5 voci & due violini
- E questa vita un lampo a 5 voci
- Spontava il di Canzonetta morale a 3 voci
- Chi vol che m'innamori Canzonetta morale a 3 con due violini
- Messa a 4 da capella
- Gloria a 7 voci concertata con due violini & quattro viole da brazzo

overo 4 Tromboni quali anco si ponno lasciare se occoresce l'acidente

- Crucifixus a quattro voci. Basso Tenore Quinto & Alto
- Et resurrexit a due Soprani o Tenori con due violini
- Et iterum a 3 voci. Basso & due Contralti Concertato con quatro Tron-

boni o viole da brazzo quali si ponno anco lasciare il qual Crucifixus servirà per variatione
della Messa a quattro pigliando questo in loco di quello notato tra li due segni

B

- Motetto a Voce sola in Basso Ab æterno ordinata sum
- Dixit Primo a 8 voci concertato con due violini & quattro viole on Tron-

boni quali se portasse l'accidente anco si ponno lasciare

- Dixit secondo a 8 voci concertato co gli stessi istromenti del primo &

nel medesimo modo

- Confitebor Primo a 3 voci con 5 altre voce ne repleni (SV 265)
- Confitebor Secondo a 3 voci concertato con due violini (SV 266)
- Confitebor Terzo alla francese a 5 voci quali si può concertare se piacerà

con quattro viole da brazzo lasciando la parte del soprano alla voce sola (SV 267)

- Beatus primo a 6 voci concertato con due violini & 3 viole da brazzo ove-

ro 3 Tromboni quali anco si ponno lasciare

- Beatus Secondo a 5 voci qual si pou cantare ridoppiato & forte o come piacerà
- Laudate pueri Primo a 5 concertato con due violini
- Laudate Pueri Secondo a 5 voci
- Laudate dominum omnes gentes Primo a 5 voci concertato con due violi-

ni & un choro a quattro voci qual potrasi e cantare e sonare co quattro vio-
le o Tromboni & anco lasciare se acadesse il bisogno

- Laudate Dominum Secondo a 8 voci & due violini
- Laudate Dominum Terzo a 8 voci
- Credidi a 8 voci da Capella
- Memento a 8 voci da Capella
- Sanctorum meritis Primo a voce sola e due violini sopra alla qual aria si

potranno cantare anco altri Hinni pero che sijno dello stesso Metro

- Sanctorum meritis secondo a voce sola concertato con due violini sopra

a la qual aria si puo cantare anco altri Hinni dello stesso Metro

- Iste Confessor voce sola & due violini sopra alla qual Aria si puo cantare

parimente Ut queant laxis die S. Gio. Batt. & simili

- Deus tuorum militum Hinno con doi violini
- Magnificat Primo a 8 voci con 2 violini e 4 viole ovvero 4 tromboni quali in accidente si possono lasciare
- Magnificat Secondo a quatro voci in genere da Capella
- Salve regina con dentro un Ecco voce sola risposta d'ecco & due violini
- Salve Regina a 2 voci due Tenori o due soprani
- Salve Regina a 3 voci Alto Basso & Tenore o Soprano

Motetti A Voce Sola

- Iubilet tota civitas a voce sola in Dialogo
- Laudate Dominum voce sola Soprano o Tenore
- Pianto Della Madonna sopra al Lamento del'Arianna

== Recordings ==
Selva morale e spirituale is a collection of individual works, not intended to be performed in that order. An early recording of the complete collection was performed by the Ensemble Vocal de Lausanne, conducted by Michel Corboz, in 1965 to 1967. Several movements have been grouped to form vespers services. A vespers sequence was recorded in 1992 by Musica Fiata, including Dixit Dominus II, Confitebor I, Beatus vir I, Laudate pueri I, Laudate Dominum III, Magnificat I and Salve Regina. The vocal movements were combined with instrumental works of Giovanni Picchi from his Canzoni da sonar (1625). A first complete recording of all works was recorded in 2001 by Cantus Cölln. A 2003 recording of the Ensemble Vocal Akadèmia combined movements to masses and vespers. In a similar approach, the ensemble La Venexiana provided in 2008 two vespers and a mass, trying to recreate the solemn mass which celebrated the cessation of the plague in Venice on 21 November 1631. In 2019 the Washington D.C. ensemble The Thirteen performed an acclaimed Lost Vespers reconstructed out of the Selva to evoke the Feast of St. John the Baptist, and leading to calls for future performances and recordings from Monteverdi's magnum opus.

- Michel Corboz, Ensemble Vocal et Instrumental de Lausanne, Erato Records 1965–87, reissued 6 CDs 2009
- Monteverdi: Selva Morale e Spirituale (excerpts), La Capella Ducale / Musica Fiata Köln, Roland Wilson 1992
- Konrad Junghänel, Cantus Cölln, Deutsche Harmonia Mundi, 2001
- Françoise Lasserre, Akadêmia Vocal Ensemble, ZigZag Territoires, 2003
- Gabriel Garrido, Ensemble Elyma, Ambronay CD, 2005
- Claudio Cavina, La Venexiana, 3 CDs, Glossa GCD 920915, 2008
- The Sixteen, Harry Christophers, 2010
- Pablo Heras-Casado, Balthasar-Neumann Choir and Ensemble, Harmonia Mundi HMM 902355, 2017

== Single works ==
=== Missa in F ===
The Mass for four voices in stile antico has been published as Missa in F. Its duration is given as 13 minutes.

=== Gloria à 7 ===
The Gloria for seven voices, two violins and basso continuo has been published as Gloria à 7. Its duration is given as 8 minutes.

=== Magnificat I ===
The first Magnificat for eight voices and instruments has been published as Magnificat a 8 voci con 6 vel 10 istromenti. It is set for double choir, two violins, four trombones, four viole da gamba (alternative combinations: 3 vga and 1 cello, or 2 and 2) and basso continuo. Its duration is given as 13 minutes.

=== Magnificat II ===
The second Magnificat for four voices in stile antico has been published as Magnificat primo tuono à 4 voci. Its duration is given as 8 minutes.
