= Vesperae solennes de Dominica =

1779 sacred choral composition by Mozart

- Solemn Vespers by W. A. Mozart
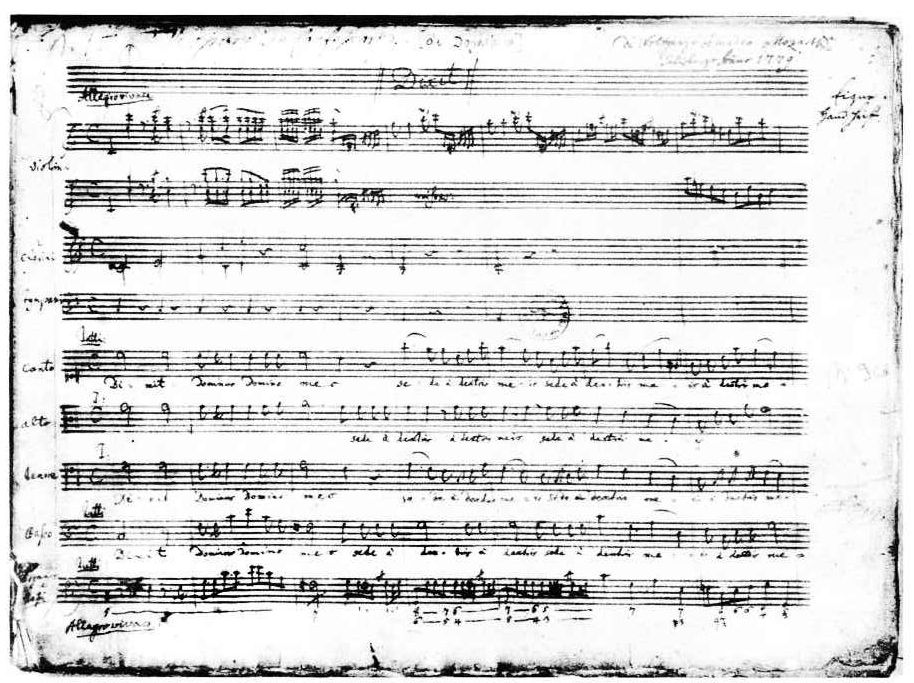
- Page 1 of the autograph:, Dixit dominus
- Catalogue: K. 321
- Text: Psalms 110–113, 117; Magnificat
- Language: Latin
- Composed: 1779: Salzburg
- Movements: 6
- Vocal: SATB choir and soloists
- Instrumental: brass and timpani; violins; continuo

Vesperae de Dominica
I. Dixit dominus

II. Confitebor

III. Beatus vir

IV. Laudate pueri

V. Laudate Dominum

VI. Magnificat

Vesperae solennes de Dominica, K. 321, is a sacred choral composition, written by Wolfgang Amadeus Mozart in 1779. It is scored for SATB choir and soloists, violin I and II, 2 trumpets, 3 trombones colla parte, 2 timpani, and basso continuo (bassoon and organ).

It was composed in Salzburg at the request of the Archbishop Colloredo for liturgical use in the city's cathedral. The title "de Dominica" signifies its use in Sunday services. In 1780, Mozart composed another setting of Solemn Vespers, the Vesperae solennes de confessore, which shares many musical similarities with this work.

== Structure ==
The setting is divided into six movements, including five psalms and a setting of the Magnificat. A setting of the Minor Doxology (Gloria Patri) concludes all movements, each recapitulating the opening theme. The first three psalms are scored in a vigorous, exuberant manner, contrasting with the strict counterpoint of the a cappella Laudate pueri. The Laudate Dominum is set as an extended aria for the soprano soloist with obbligato organ, while the Magnificat opens with a majestic, moderate tempo, only to return to the bolder tempo of the first three psalms.

1. Dixit. Allegro vivace, C major,
2. Confitebor. Allegro, E minor, 3/4
3. Beatus vir. Allegro, B♭ major,
4. Laudate pueri. F major,
5. Laudate Dominum. Allegro, A major, 3/4
6. Magnificat. Adagio maestoso, C major,
  "Et exultavit" Allegro, C major,
