= Vesperae solennes de confessore =

1780 sacred choral composition by Mozart

- Solemn Vespers by W. A. Mozart
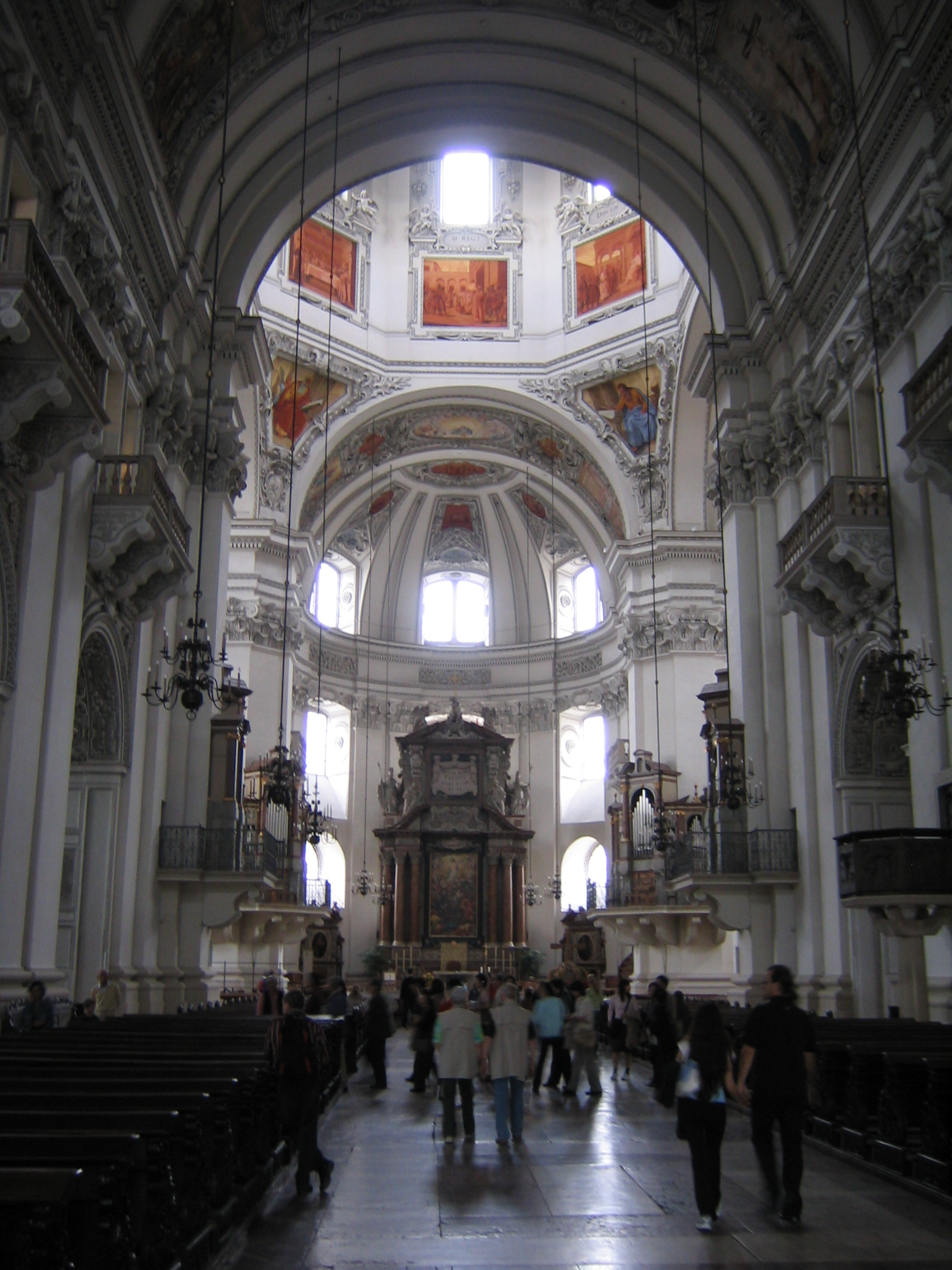
- Salzburg Cathedral, for which the music was composed
- Catalogue: K. 339
- Text: Psalms 110–113, 117; Magnificat
- Language: Latin
- Composed: 1780: Salzburg
- Movements: 6
- Vocal: SATB choir and soloists
- Instrumental: brass and timpani; violins; continuo

Vesperae solennes de confessore (Solemn Vespers for a Confessor), K. 339, is a sacred choral composition written by Wolfgang Amadeus Mozart in 1780. It is scored for SATB choir and soloists, violin I, violin II, 2 trumpets, 3 trombones colla parte, 2 timpani, and basso continuo (violoncello, double bass, and organ, with optional bassoon obbligato).

The composition was written for liturgical use in the Salzburg Cathedral. The title "de confessore" was not Mozart's own, having been added to his manuscript later. It suggests the work was intended for vespers held on a specific day on the liturgical calendar of saints ("confessors"); however, the saint in question has not been conclusively established, and may not have existed. This was Mozart's final choral work composed for the cathedral.

Structurally, it is very similar to K. 321 Vesperae solennes de Dominica, composed in 1779. The composition is divided into six movements; as in Dominica, a setting of the Minor Doxology (Gloria Patri) concludes all movements, each recapitulating the opening themes. The first three psalms are scored in a bold, exuberant manner, contrasting with the strict, stile antico counterpoint of the a cappella fourth psalm, and the tranquility of the fifth movement. The Magnificat sees a return to the style of the opening settings.

I. Dixit

II. Confitebor

III. Beatus Vir

IV. Laudate pueri

V. Laudate Dominum

VI. Magnificat
Performed by St Matthew's Choir, 2004; Clive Cooke, director

1. Dixit Dominus (Psalm 110). Allegro vivace, C major, 3/4
2. Confitebor tibi Domine (Psalm 111). Allegro, E♭ major, common time
3. Beatus vir qui timet Dominum (Psalm 112). Allegro vivace, G major, 3/4
4. Laudate pueri Dominum (Psalm 113). Allegro, D minor, cut common time
5. Laudate Dominum omnes gentes (Psalm 117). Andante, F major, 6/8
6. Magnificat (Canticle for Vespers). Andante, C major, common time
  —"Et exultavit..." Allegro, C major, common time

Mozart departs from the structure of K. 321 in the fifth movement. The earlier setting of Laudate Dominum is a highly melismatic soprano solo, with no choral interlude. In K. 339, the soprano solo is much simpler; the choir quietly enters at the conclusion of the psalm with the Gloria Patri, and the soloist rejoins them at the Amen. This movement is well known outside the context of the larger work and is often performed in isolation.
