= Stattkus-Verzeichnis =

Catalogue of the musical compositions of Claudio Monteverdi

The Stattkus-Verzeichnis (SV) is a catalogue of the musical compositions of the Italian composer Claudio Monteverdi. The catalogue was published in 1985 by Manfred H. Stattkus (Claudio Monteverdi: Verzeichnis der erhaltenen Werke). A free, basic second edition of the catalogue is available online.

Manfred H. Stattkus died in August 2012.

== List ==
Click the links to go to the corresponding section in the table.

- SV 1–21 Canzonette
- SV 22 Other
- SV 23–39 Madrigali I
- SV 40–59 Madrigali II
- SV 60–74 Madrigali III
- SV 75–93 Madrigali IV
- SV 94–106 Madrigali V
- SV 107–116 Madrigali VI
- SV 117–145 Madrigali VII
- SV 146–167 Madrigali VIII
- SV 168–178 Madrigali IX
- SV 190–204 Messa Et Salmi
- SV 205–206 Missa Ac Vesperae
- SV 207–229 Sacrae Cantiunculae
- SV 230–245 Scherzi Musicali I
- SV 246–251 Scherzi Musicali II
- SV 252–288 Selva Morale E Spirituale
- SV 289– Others

| ID | Title |
Canzonette (SV 1–21)
| SV 1 | Qual si può dir maggiore |
| SV 2 | Canzonette d'amore che m'uscite del cuore |
| SV 3 | La fiera vista e'l velenoso sguardo |
| SV 4 | Raggi dovè il mio bene non mi date più pene |
| SV 5 | Vita de l'alma mia |
| SV 6 | Il mio martir tengo celat al cuore |
| SV 7 | Son questi i crespi crini e questo il viso |
| SV 8 | Io mi vivea com' Aquila mirando |
| SV 9 | Su ch'el giorno è fore |
| SV 10 | Quando sperai del mio servir mercede |
| SV 11 | Come farò cuor mio quando mi parto, |
| SV 12 | Corse a la morte il povero Narciso |
| SV 13 | Tu ridi sempre mai per darmi pene |
| SV 14 | Chi vuol veder d'inverno un dolc' aprile |
| SV 15 | Già mi credev' un sol esser in cielo |
| SV 16 | Godi pur del bel sen felice pulce |
| SV 17 | Giulia quel petto giace un bel giardino |
| SV 18 | Sì come crescon alla terra i fiori, |
| SV 19 | Io son Fenice e voi sete la fiamma |
| SV 20 | Chi vuol veder un bosco folto e spesso |
| SV 21 | Hor care canzonette sicuramente andrete |
Other (SV 22)
| SV 22 | Lamento d'Arianna |
Madrigali I (SV 23–39)
| SV 23 | Ch'ami la vita mia nel tuo bel nome |
| SV 24 | Se per havervi ohimè donato il core |
| SV 25 | A che tormi il ben mio s'io dico di morire |
| SV 26 | Amor per tua mercè vattene a quella, |
| SV 27 | Baci soavi e cari, cibi della mia vita |
| SV 28 | Se pur non mi consenti ch'io ami te |
| SV 29 | Filli cara e amata dimmi per cortesia |
| SV 30 | Poiché del mio dolore tanto ti nutri amore |
| SV 31 | Fumia la pastorella tessendo ghirlandetta |
| SV 32 | Se nel partir da voi vita mia sento |
| SV 33 | Tra mille fiamme e tra mille catene |
| SV 34 | Usciam Ninfe homai fuor di questi boschi |
| SV 35 | Questa ordì il laccio, questa sì bella man |
| SV 36 | La vaga pastorella s'en va tra fiori |
| SV 37 | Amor sil tuo ferire desse tanto martire |
| SV 38 | Donna sio miro voi ghiaccio divengo |
| SV 39 | Ardo sì ma non t'amo |
Madrigali II (SV 40–59)
| SV 40 | Non si levava ancor l'alba novella |
| SV 41 | Bevea Fillide mia e nel ber dolcemente |
| SV 42 | Dolcissimi legami di parole amorose |
| SV 43 | Non giacinti o narcisi |
| SV 44 | Intorno a due vermiglie e vaghe labra |
| SV 45 | Non sono in queste rive fiori così vermigli |
| SV 46 | Tutte le bocche belle in questo nero volto |
| SV 47 | Donna nel mio ritorno il mio pensiero |
| SV 48 | Quell' ombra esser vorrei |
| SV 49 | S'andasse Amor a caccia |
| SV 50 | Mentre io miravo fiso de la mia donna |
| SV 51 | Ecco mormorar l'onde e tremolar le fronde |
| SV 52 | Dolcemente dormiva la mia Clori |
| SV 53 | Se tu mi lassi perfida tuo danno |
| SV 54 | La bocca onde l'asprissime parole solean uscir |
| SV 55 | Crudel perchè mi fuggi |
| SV 56 | Questo specchio ti dono rosa tu dami |
| SV 57 | Non mi è grave il morire |
| SV 58 | Ti spontò l'ali amor la donna mia |
| SV 59 | Cantai un tempo e se fu dolc' il canto |
Madrigali III (SV 60–74)
| SV 60 | La giovinetta pianta |
| SV 61 | O come è gran martire a celar suo desire |
| SV 62 | Sovra tenere herbette e bianchi fiori |
| SV 63 | O dolce anima mia dunque è pur vero |
| SV 64 | Stracciami pur il core ragion è ben ingrato |
| SV 65 | O rossignuol chin queste verdi fronde |
| SV 66 | Se per estremo ardore morir potesse un core |
| SV 67 | Vattene pur crudel con quella pace |
| SV 68 | O primavera gioventù dell anno |
| SV 69 | Perfidissimo volto ben lusata bellezza |
| SV 70 | Chio non tami cor mio |
| SV 71 | Occhi un tempo mia vita |
| SV 72 | Vivrò fra i miei tormenti e le mie cure |
| SV 73 | Lumi miei, cari lumi |
| SV 74 | Rimanti in pace a la dolente e bella Fillida |
Madrigali IV (SV 75–93)
| SV 75 | Ah dolente partita, ah fin de la mia vita |
| SV 76 | Cor mio mentre vi miro |
| SV 77 | Cor mio non mori e mori |
| SV 78 | Sfogava con le stelle |
| SV 79 | Volgea l'anima mia soavemente |
| SV 80 | Anima mia perdona a chi tè cruda |
| SV 81 | Luci serene e chiare voi mincendete |
| SV 82 | La piaga cho nel core donna onde lieta sei |
| SV 83 | Voi pur da me partite anima dura |
| SV 84 | A un giro sol de bell occhi lucenti |
| SV 85 | Ohimè se tanto amate di sentir |
| SV 86 | Io mi son giovinetta e rido e canto |
| SV 87 | Quel augellin che canta sì dolcemente |
| SV 88 | Non più guerra pietate occhi miei belli |
| SV 89 | Sì ch'io vorrei morire hora chio bacio amore |
| SV 90 | Anima dolorosa che vivendo |
| SV 91 | Anima del cor mio poi che da me misera me |
| SV 92 | Longe da te cor mio struggomi di dolore |
| SV 93 | Piagn'e sospira e quandi caldi raggi |
Madrigali V (SV 94–106)
| SV 94 | Cruda Amarilli che col nome ancora d'amar |
| SV 95 | O Mirtillo anima mia |
| SV 96 | Era l'anima mia già presso a l'ultim' hore |
| SV 97 | Ecco Silvio colei che in odio hai tanto |
| SV 98 | Ch'io t'ami e t'ami più de la mia vita |
| SV 99 | Che dar più vi poss' io, caro mio ben prendete |
| SV 100 | M'è più dolce il penar per Amarilli |
| SV 101 | Ahi come a un vago sol cortese giro |
| SV 102 | Troppo ben può questo tiranno amore |
| SV 103 | Amor se giusto sei fa che la donna mia |
| SV 104 | T'amo mia vita, la mia cara vita |
| SV 105 | E così a poco a poco torno farfalla |
| SV 106 | Questi vaghi concenti che gli augelletti intorno |
Madrigali VI (SV 107–116)
| SV 107 | Lamento d'Arianna a 5 |
| SV 108 | Zefiro torna el bel tempo rimena |
| SV 109 | Una donna fra laltre honesta e bella |
| SV 110 | A dio Florida bella il cor piagato |
| SV 111 | Lagrime d'amante al sepolcro dell amata |
| SV 112 | Ohimè il bel viso, ohimè il soave sguardo |
| SV 113 | Qui rise o Tirsi e qui ver me rivolse |
| SV 114 | Misero Alceo dal caro albergo fore |
| SV 114a | Misero Alceo dal caro albergo fore |
| SV 115 | Batto qui pianse Ergasto, ecco la riva |
| SV 116 | Presso un fiume tranquillo disse a Filena |
| SV 116a | Presso un fiume tranquillo disse a Filena |
Madrigali VII (SV 117–145)
| SV 117 | Tempro la cetra e per cantar gli honori di Marte |
| SV 118 | Non è di gentil core chi non arde d'amore |
| SV 119 | A quest olmo, a quest ombre et a quest onde |
| SV 120 | O come sei gentile caro augellino |
| SV 121 | Io son pur vezzosetta pastorella |
| SV 122 | O viva fiamma, o miei sospiri ardenti, |
| SV 123 | Vorrei baciarti o Filli |
| SV 124 | Dice la mia bellissima Licori |
| SV 125 | Ah che non si conviene romper la fede |
| SV 126 | Non vedrò mai le stelle |
| SV 127 | Ecco vicine, o bella tigre |
| SV 128 | Perchè fuggi tra salci, ritrosetta ma bella |
| SV 129 | Tornate o cari baci a ritornarmi in vita |
| SV 130 | Soave libertate già per si lunga etate |
| SV 131 | S'el vostro cor madonna altrui pietoso tanto |
| SV 132 | Interrotte speranze, eterna fede |
| SV 133 | Augellin che la voce al canto spieghi |
| SV 134 | Vaga su spina ascosa e rosa ruggiadosa |
| SV 135 | Eccomi pronta ai baci |
| SV 136 | Parlo misero o taccio |
| SV 137 | Tu dormi, ah crudo core |
| SV 138 | Al lume delle stelle Tirsi sotto un alloro |
| SV 139 | Con che soavità labbra odorate |
| SV 140 | Ohimè dovè il mio ben, dov'è il mio core |
| SV 141 | Se i languidi miei sguardi |
| SV 142 | Se pur destina e vole |
| SV 143 | Chiome doro, bel tesoro |
| SV 144 | Amor che deggio far se non mi giova amar |
| SV 145 | Tirsi e Clori |
Madrigali VIII (SV 146–167)
Canti Guerrieri (SV 146–154)
| SV 146 | Altri canti d'Amor |
| SV 147 | Hor che'l ciel e la terra e'l vento tace |
| SV 148 | Gira il nemico insidioso amore |
| SV 149 | Se vittorie sì belle |
| SV 150 | Armato il cor dadamantina fede |
| SV 151 | Ogni amante è guerrier |
| SV 152 | Ardo avvampo mi struggo, ardo accorete amici |
| SV 153 | Il combattimento di Tancredi e Clorinda |
| SV 154 | Ballo: Movete al mio bel suon le piante snelle |
Canti Amorosi (SV 155–167)
| SV 155 | Altri canti di Marte e di sua schiera |
| SV 156 | Vago augelletto che cantando vai |
| SV 157 | Mentre vaga Angioletta |
| SV 158 | Ardo e scoprir ahi lasso |
| SV 159 | O sia tranquillo il mare |
| SV 160 | Ninfa che scalza il piede |
| SV 161 | Dolcissimo uscignolo |
| SV 162 | Chi vol haver felice e lieto il core |
| SV 163 | Lamento della Ninfa |
| SV 164 | Perchè ten fuggi o Fillide |
| SV 165 | Non partir ritrosetta troppo lieve e incostante |
| SV 166 | Su pastorelli vezzosi |
| SV 167 | Il ballo delle ingrate |
Madrigali IX (SV 168–178)
| SV 168 | Bel pastor del cui bel guardo |
| SV 169 | Alcun non mi consigli |
| SV 170 | Di far sempre gioire |
| SV 171 | Quando dentro al tuo seno |
| SV 172 | Non voglio amare |
| SV 173 | Come dolce hoggi lauretta spira |
| SV 174 | Alle danze, alle gioie, ai diletti |
| SV 175 | Perchè se modiavi |
| SV 176 | Sì chio vamo, occhi vaghi, occhi belli |
| SV 177 | Su pastorelli vezzosi |
| SV 178 | O mio bene, o mia vita |
Messa Et Salmi (SV 190–204)
| SV 190 | Messa a 4 voci da capella |
| SV 191 | Dixit dominus I, a 8 |
| SV 192 | Dixit dominus II, a 8 |
| SV 193 | Confitebor tibi domine I, a 1 |
| SV 194 | Confitebor tibi domine II, a 2 |
| SV 195 | Beatus vir |
| SV 196 | Laudate pueri dominum |
| SV 197 | Laudate dominum omnes gentes |
| SV 197a | Laudate dominum omnes gentes |
| SV 198 | Laetatus sum I, a 6 |
| SV 199 | Laetatus sum II, a 5 |
| SV 200 | Nisi dominus I, a 3 |
| SV 201 | Nisi dominus II, a 6 |
| SV 202 | Lauda Jerusalem dominum I, a 3 |
| SV 203 | Lauda Jerusalem dominum II, a |
| SV 204 | Letanie della Beata Vergine |
Missa Ac Vesperae (SV 205–206)
| SV 205 | Missa a 6 voci da capella "In illo tempore" |
| SV 205a | Missa a 6 voci da capella "In illo tempore" |
| SV 206 | Vespro della Beata Vergine |
| SV 206a | Vespro della Beata Vergine |
Sacrae Cantiunculae (SV 207–229)
| SV 207 | Lapidabant Stephanum |
| SV 208 | Veni sponsa Christi |
| SV 209 | Ego sum pastor bonus |
| SV 210 | Surge propera amica mea |
| SV 211 | Ubi duo vel tres congregati fuerint |
| SV 212 | Quam pulchra es et quam decora amica mea |
| SV 213 | Ave Maria gratia plena |
| SV 214 | Domine pater et deus |
| SV 215 | Tu es pastor ovium |
| SV 216 | O magnum pietatis |
| SV 217 | O crux benedicta |
| SV 218 | Hodie Christus natus est |
| SV 219 | O domine Jesu Christe adoro te |
| SV 220 | Pater venit hora clarifica filium tuum |
| SV 221 | In tua patientia possedisti animam tuam |
| SV 222 | Angelus ad pastores ait |
| SV 223 | Salve crux pretiosa |
| SV 224 | Quia vidisti me Thoma credidisti |
| SV 225 | Lauda Syon salvatorem |
| SV 226 | O bone Iesu illumina oculos meos |
| SV 227 | Surgens Iesus dominus noster |
| SV 228 | Qui vult venire post me abneget se |
| SV 229 | Iusti tulerunt spolia impiorum |
Scherzi Musicali I (SV 230–245)
| SV 230 | I bei legami che stami intorno |
| SV 231 | Amarilli onde m'assale |
| SV 232 | Fugge il verno dei dolori |
| SV 233 | Quando lalba in oriente |
| SV 234 | Non così tosto io miro |
| SV 235 | Damigella tutta bella |
| SV 236 | La pastorella mia spietata e rigida |
| SV 237 | O rosetta, che rosetta |
| SV 238 | Amorosa pupilletta che saetta |
| SV 239 | Vaghi rai di cigli ardenti |
| SV 240 | La violetta chen su lherbetta |
| SV 241 | Giovinetta ritrosetta |
| SV 242 | Dolci miei sospiri |
| SV 243 | Clori amorosa damor rubella |
| SV 244 | Lidia spina del mio core |
| SV 245 | Balletto: De la bellezza le dovute lodi |
Scherzi Musicali II (SV 246–251)
| SV 246 | Maledetto sia laspetto |
| SV 247 | Quel sguardo sdegnosetto |
| SV 248 | Era già tutta mia |
| SV 249 | Ecco di dolci raggi il sol armato |
| SV 249a | Ecco di dolci raggi il sol armato |
| SV 250 | Et è pur dunque verò |
| SV 251 | Zefiro torna e di soavi accenti |
Selva Morale e Spirituale (SV 252–288)
| SV 252 | O ciechi il tanto affaticar che giova |
| SV 253 | Voi chascoltate in rime sparse il suono |
| SV 254 | E questa vita un lampo |
| SV 255 | Spuntava il dì quando la rosa sovra |
| SV 256 | Chi vol minnamori |
| SV 257 | Messa a 4 da capella |
| SV 257a | Messa a 4 da capella |
| SV 258 | Gloria |
| SV 259 | Crucifixus |
| SV 260 | Et resurrexit |
| SV 261 | Et iterum venturus est |
| SV 262 | Ab aeterno ordinata sum |
| SV 263 | Dixit dominus I, a 8 in g |
| SV 264 | Dixit dominus II, a 8 in d |
| SV 265 | Confitebor tibi domine I, a 8 |
| SV 266 | Confitebor tibi domine II, a 3 |
| SV 267 | Confitebor tibi domine III, a 5 |
| SV 267a | Confitebor tibi domine IIIa, a 1 |
| SV 268 | Beatus vir I, a 6 |
| SV 269 | Beatus vir II, a 5 |
| SV 270 | Laudate pueri dominum I, a 5 |
| SV 271 | Laudate pueri dominum II, a 5 |
| SV 272 | Laudate dominum omnes gentes I, a 8 |
| SV 272a | Laudate dominum omnes gentes Ia, a 5 |
| SV 273 | Laudate dominum omnes gentes II |
| SV 274 | Laudate dominum omnes gentes III |
| SV 275 | Credidi propter quod locutus sum |
| SV 276 | Memento domine David |
| SV 277 | Sanctorum meritis I |
| SV 278 | Sanctorum meritis II |
| SV 278a | Deus tuorum militum I, a 1 |
| SV 278b | Iste confessor I, a 1 |
| SV 279 | Iste confessor II, a 2 |
| SV 279a | Ut queant laxis |
| SV 280 | Deus tuorum militum II, a 3 |
| SV 281 | Magnificat I, a 6 |
| SV 282 | Magnificat II, a 4 |
| SV 283 | Salve Regina I |
| SV 284 | Salve Regina II |
| SV 285 | Salve Regina III |
| SV 286 | Jubilet tota civitas |
| SV 287 | Laudate dominum in sanctis eius |
| SV 288 | Pianto della Madonna |
Others (SV 289–)
| SV 289 | Adoramus te Christe |
| SV 290 | Ahi che si partì il mio bel sol adorno |
| SV 291 | L'Arianna |
| SV 292 | Cantate domino canticum novum a 2 |
| SV 293 | Cantate domino canticum novum a 6 |
| SV 294 | Christe adoramus te, |
| SV 295 | Confitebor tibi domine a 4 |
| SV 296 | Confitebor tibi domine a 1 |
| SV 297 | Currite populi, psallite timpanis |
| SV 298 | Domine ne in furore tuo |
| SV 299 | Ecce sacrum paratum convivium |
| SV 299a | Ecce sacrum paratum convivium |
| SV 300 | Ego dormio et cor meum vigilat |
| SV 301 | Ego flos campi |
| SV 302 | En gratulemur hodie |
| SV 303 | Exulta filia Sion |
| SV 304 | Exultent caeli et gaudeant angeli |
| SV 305 | Fuge anima mea mundum |
| SV 307 | Gloria a 8 |
| SV 308 | L'Incoronazione di Poppea |
| SV 309 | Io ardo sì, ma'l foco è di tal sorte |
| SV 310 | La mia Turca che d'Amor non ha fè |
| SV 311 | Laudate pueri dominum a 6 |
| SV 312 | O beatae viae |
| SV 313 | O bone Jesu, o piissime Jesu |
| SV 314 | Occhi miei se mirar più non debb' io |
| SV 315 | O come vaghi, o come cari sono Lidia |
| SV 316 | Ohimè ch'io cado |
| SV 317 | O quam pulchra es amica mea |
| SV 318 | L'Orfeo |
| SV 320 | Perchè se m'odiavi |
| SV 321 | Più lieto il guardo |
| SV 322 | Prima vedrò ch'in questi prati nascano |
| SV 324 | Quante son stelle in ciel |
| SV 325 | Il ritorno d'Ulisse in patria |
| SV 326 | Salve o Regina |
| SV 327 | Salve Regina |
| SV 328 | Sancta Maria succurre miseris |
| SV 331 | Se non mi date aita |
| SV 332 | Sì dolce è'l tormento |
| SV 333 | Su le penne de' venti |
| SV 334 | Taci Armelin, deh taci |
| SV 335 | Venite sitientes ad aquas domini |
| SV 336 | Venite videte martirem |
| SV 337 | Voglio di vita uscir |
| SV A1 | Ballo |
| SV A2 | Lamento di Olimpia |
