= Psalm 50 =

Biblical psalm

- "The mighty God, even the LORD, hath spoken"
- A Latin phrase from Psalm 50 in the coat of arms of Spain
- Other name: Psalm 49; "Deus deorum"
- Language: Hebrew (original)

Psalm 50
- ← Psalm 49 Psalm 51 →
- Book: Book of Psalms
- Hebrew Bible part: Ketuvim
- Order in the Hebrew part: 1
- Category: Sifrei Emet
- Christian Bible part: Old Testament
- Order in the Christian part: 19

Psalm 50, a Psalm of Asaph, is the 50th psalm from the Book of Psalms in the Bible, beginning in English in the King James Version: "The mighty God, even the LORD, hath spoken, and called the earth from the rising of the sun unto the going down thereof." In the slightly different numbering system used in the Greek Septuagint and Latin Vulgate translations of the Bible, this psalm is Psalm 49. The opening words in Latin are Deus deorum, Dominus, locutus est / et vocavit terram a solis ortu usque ad occasum. The psalm is a prophetic imagining of God's judgment on the Israelites.

The psalm forms a regular part of Jewish, Catholic, Lutheran, Anglican and other Protestant liturgies. It has been set to music completely and in single verses. The phrase A solis ortu usque ad occasum, taken from verse 1, or Psalm 113:3 is part of a Spanish coat of arms.

== Composition ==
The psalm has been variously dated to either the 8th century BC, the time of the prophets Hosea and Micah, or to a time after the Babylonian captivity. The latter date is supported by the reference to "gathering" in verse 5, but is problematic because verse 2 describes Zion (another name for Jerusalem) as "the perfection of beauty", even though Jerusalem was destroyed in 587 BC.

== Uses ==
=== Judaism ===
Psalm 50 is recited on the fourth day of Sukkot.

=== Book of Common Prayer ===
In the Church of England's Book of Common Prayer, this psalm is appointed to be read on the morning of the tenth day of the month.

=== Musical settings ===
In a Scottish Psalter of 1650, Psalm 50 was paraphrased rhymed in English as "The mighty God, the Lord, Hath spoken, and did call". The 1863 hymn "For the Beauty of the Earth" by Folliott Sandford Pierpoint issues verse 14.

Heinrich Schütz set Psalm 50 in a rhymed version in the Becker Psalter, as "Gott unser Herr, mächtig durchs Wort", SWV 147. The last verse is used in German in the opening chorus of Bach's cantata Wer Dank opfert, der preiset mich, BWV 17, composed in 1726.

F. Melius Christiansen created a famous choral arrangement of Psalm 50 in 1922. This setting was dedicated to the St. Olaf Choir for the 10th anniversary of the choir's formation.

== Text ==
The following table shows the Hebrew text of the Psalm with vowels, alongside the Koine Greek text in the Septuagint and the English translation from the King James Version. Note that the meaning can slightly differ between these versions, as the Septuagint and the Masoretic Text come from different textual traditions. (Note: A 1917 translation directly from Hebrew to English by the Jewish Publication Society can be found here or here, and an 1844 translation directly from the Septuagint by L. C. L. Brenton can be found here. Both translations are in the public domain.) In the Septuagint, this psalm is numbered Psalm 49.

#	Hebrew	English	Greek
1	מִזְמ֗וֹר לְאָ֫סָ֥ף אֵ֤ל ׀ אֱֽלֹהִ֡ים יְֽהֹוָ֗ה דִּבֶּ֥ר וַיִּקְרָא־אָ֑רֶץ מִמִּזְרַח־שֶׁ֝֗מֶשׁ עַד־מְבֹאֽוֹ׃	(A Psalm of Asaph.) The mighty God, even the LORD, hath spoken, and called the earth from the rising of the sun unto the going down thereof.	Ψαλμὸς τῷ ᾿Ασάφ. - ΘΕΟΣ θεῶν Κύριος ἐλάλησε καὶ ἐκάλεσε τὴν γῆν ἀπὸ ἀνατολῶν ἡλίου μέχρι δυσμῶν.
2	מִצִּיּ֥וֹן מִכְלַל־יֹ֗פִי אֱלֹהִ֥ים הוֹפִֽיעַ׃	Out of Zion, the perfection of beauty, God hath shined.	ἐκ Σιὼν ἡ εὐπρέπεια τῆς ὡραιότητος αὐτοῦ,
3	יָ֤בֹ֥א אֱלֹהֵ֗ינוּ וְֽאַל־יֶ֫חֱרַ֥שׁ אֵשׁ־לְפָנָ֥יו תֹּאכֵ֑ל וּ֝סְבִיבָ֗יו נִשְׂעֲרָ֥ה מְאֹֽד׃	Our God shall come, and shall not keep silence: a fire shall devour before him, and it shall be very tempestuous round about him.	ὁ Θεὸς ἐμφανῶς ἥξει, ὁ Θεὸς ἡμῶν, καὶ οὐ παρασιωπήσεται· πῦρ ἐνώπιον αὐτοῦ καυθήσεται, καὶ κύκλῳ αὐτοῦ καταιγὶς σφόδρα.
4	יִקְרָ֣א אֶל־הַשָּׁמַ֣יִם מֵעָ֑ל וְאֶל־הָ֝אָ֗רֶץ לָדִ֥ין עַמּֽוֹ׃	He shall call to the heavens from above, and to the earth, that he may judge his people.	προσκαλέσεται τὸν οὐρανὸν ἄνω καὶ τὴν γῆν τοῦ διακρῖναι τὸν λαὸν αὐτοῦ·
5	אִסְפוּ־לִ֥י חֲסִידָ֑י כֹּרְתֵ֖י בְרִיתִ֣י עֲלֵי־זָֽבַח׃	Gather my saints together unto me; those that have made a covenant with me by sacrifice.	συναγάγετε αὐτῷ τοὺς ὁσίους αὐτοῦ, τοὺς διατιθεμένους τὴν διαθήκην αὐτοῦ ἐπὶ θυσίαις,
6	וַיַּגִּ֣ידוּ שָׁמַ֣יִם צִדְק֑וֹ כִּֽי־אֱלֹהִ֓ים ׀ שֹׁפֵ֖ט ה֣וּא סֶֽלָה׃	And the heavens shall declare his righteousness: for God is judge himself. Selah.	καὶ ἀναγγελοῦσιν οἱ οὐρανοὶ τὴν δικαιοσύνην αὐτοῦ, ὅτι ὁ Θεὸς κριτής ἐστι. (διάψαλμα).
7	שִׁמְעָ֤ה עַמִּ֨י ׀ וַאֲדַבֵּ֗רָה יִ֭שְׂרָאֵל וְאָעִ֣ידָה בָּ֑ךְ אֱלֹהִ֖ים אֱלֹהֶ֣יךָ אָנֹֽכִי׃	Hear, O my people, and I will speak; O Israel, and I will testify against thee: I am God, even thy God.	ἄκουσον, λαός μου, καὶ λαλήσω σοι, ᾿Ισραήλ, καὶ διαμαρτύρομαί σοι· ὁ Θεὸς ὁ Θεός σού εἰμι ἐγώ.
8	לֹ֣א עַל־זְ֭בָחֶיךָ אוֹכִיחֶ֑ךָ וְעוֹלֹתֶ֖יךָ לְנֶגְדִּ֣י תָמִֽיד׃	I will not reprove thee for thy sacrifices or thy burnt offerings, to have been continually before me.	οὐκ ἐπὶ ταῖς θυσίαις σου ἐλέγξω σε, τὰ δὲ ὁλοκαυτώματά σου ἐνώπιόν μου ἐστὶ διαπαντός.
9	לֹא־אֶקַּ֣ח מִבֵּיתְךָ֣ פָ֑ר מִ֝מִּכְלְאֹתֶ֗יךָ עַתּוּדִֽים׃	I will take no bullock out of thy house, nor he goats out of thy folds.	οὐ δέξομαι ἐκ τοῦ οἴκου σου μόσχους οὐδὲ ἐκ τῶν ποιμνίων σου χιμάρους.
10	כִּי־לִ֥י כׇל־חַיְתוֹ־יָ֑עַר בְּ֝הֵמ֗וֹת בְּהַרְרֵי־אָֽלֶף׃	For every beast of the forest is mine, and the cattle upon a thousand hills.	ὅτι ἐμά ἐστι πάντα τὰ θηρία τοῦ δρυμοῦ, κτήνη ἐν τοῖς ὄρεσι καὶ βόες·
11	יָ֭דַעְתִּי כׇּל־ע֣וֹף הָרִ֑ים וְזִ֥יז שָׂ֝דַ֗י עִמָּדִֽי׃	I know all the fowls of the mountains: and the wild beasts of the field are mine.	ἔγνωκα πάντα τὰ πετεινὰ τοῦ οὐρανοῦ, καὶ ὡραιότης ἀγροῦ μετ᾿ ἐμοῦ ἐστιν.
12	אִם־אֶ֭רְעַב לֹא־אֹ֣מַר לָ֑ךְ כִּי־לִ֥י תֵ֝בֵ֗ל וּמְלֹאָֽהּ׃	If I were hungry, I would not tell thee: for the world is mine, and the fulness thereof.	ἐὰν πεινάσω, οὐ μή σοι εἴπω· ἐμὴ γάρ ἐστιν ἡ οἰκουμένη καὶ τὸ πλήρωμα αὐτῆς.
13	הַ֭אוֹכַל בְּשַׂ֣ר אַבִּירִ֑ים וְדַ֖ם עַתּוּדִ֣ים אֶשְׁתֶּֽה׃	Will I eat the flesh of bulls, or drink the blood of goats?	μὴ φάγομαι κρέα ταύρων, ἢ αἷμα τράγων πίομαι;
14	זְבַ֣ח לֵאלֹהִ֣ים תּוֹדָ֑ה וְשַׁלֵּ֖ם לְעֶלְי֣וֹן נְדָרֶֽיךָ׃	Offer unto God thanksgiving; and pay thy vows unto the most High:	θῦσον τῷ Θεῷ θυσίαν αἰνέσεως καὶ ἀπόδος τῷ ῾Υψίστῳ τὰς εὐχάς σου·
15	וּ֭קְרָאֵנִי בְּי֣וֹם צָרָ֑ה אֲ֝חַלֶּצְךָ֗ וּֽתְכַבְּדֵֽנִי׃	And call upon me in the day of trouble: I will deliver thee, and thou shalt glorify me.	καὶ ἐπικάλεσαί με ἐν ἡμέρᾳ θλίψεώς σου, καὶ ἐξελοῦμαί σε, καὶ δοξάσεις με. (διάψαλμα).
16	וְלָ֤רָשָׁ֨ע ׀ אָ֘מַ֤ר אֱלֹהִ֗ים מַה־לְּ֭ךָ לְסַפֵּ֣ר חֻקָּ֑י וַתִּשָּׂ֖א בְרִיתִ֣י עֲלֵי־פִֽיךָ׃	But unto the wicked God saith, What hast thou to do to declare my statutes, or that thou shouldest take my covenant in thy mouth?	τῷ δὲ ἁμαρτωλῷ εἶπεν ὁ Θεός· ἱνατί σὺ διηγῇ τὰ δικαιώματά μου καὶ ἀναλαμβάνεις τὴν διαθήκην μου διὰ στόματός σου;
17	וְ֭אַתָּה שָׂנֵ֣אתָ מוּסָ֑ר וַתַּשְׁלֵ֖ךְ דְּבָרַ֣י אַחֲרֶֽיךָ׃	Seeing thou hatest instruction, and castest my words behind thee.	σὺ δὲ ἐμίσησας παιδείαν καὶ ἐξέβαλες τοὺς λόγους μου εἰς τὰ ὀπίσω.
18	אִם־רָאִ֣יתָ גַ֭נָּב וַתִּ֣רֶץ עִמּ֑וֹ וְעִ֖ם מְנָאֲפִ֣ים חֶלְקֶֽךָ׃	When thou sawest a thief, then thou consentedst with him, and hast been partaker with adulterers.	εἰ ἐθεώρεις κλέπτην, συνέτρεχες αὐτῷ, καὶ μετὰ μοιχοῦ τὴν μερίδα σου ἐτίθεις.
19	פִּ֭יךָ שָׁלַ֣חְתָּ בְרָעָ֑ה וּ֝לְשׁוֹנְךָ֗ תַּצְמִ֥יד מִרְמָֽה׃	Thou givest thy mouth to evil, and thy tongue frameth deceit.	τὸ στόμα σου ἐπλεόνασε κακίαν, καὶ ἡ γλῶσσά σου περιέπλεκε δολιότητα·
20	תֵּ֭שֵׁב בְּאָחִ֣יךָ תְדַבֵּ֑ר בְּבֶֽן־אִ֝מְּךָ֗ תִּתֶּן־דֹּֽפִי׃	Thou sittest and speakest against thy brother; thou slanderest thine own mother's son.	καθήμενος κατὰ τοῦ ἀδελφοῦ σου κατελάλεις καὶ κατὰ τοῦ υἱοῦ τῆς μητρός σου ἐτίθεις σκάνδαλον.
21	אֵ֤לֶּה עָשִׂ֨יתָ ׀ וְֽהֶחֱרַ֗שְׁתִּי דִּמִּ֗יתָ הֱיֽוֹת־אֶהְיֶ֥ה כָמ֑וֹךָ אוֹכִיחֲךָ֖ וְאֶעֶרְכָ֣ה לְעֵינֶֽיךָ׃	These things hast thou done, and I kept silence; thou thoughtest that I was altogether such an one as thyself: but I will reprove thee, and set them in order before thine eyes.	ταῦτα ἐποίησας, καὶ ἐσίγησα· ὑπέλαβες ἀνομίαν, ὅτι ἔσομαί σοι ὅμοιος· ἐλέγξω σε καὶ παραστήσω κατὰ πρόσωπόν σου τὰς ἁμαρτίας σου.
22	בִּינוּ־נָ֣א זֹ֭את שֹׁכְחֵ֣י אֱל֑וֹהַּ פֶּן־אֶ֝טְרֹ֗ף וְאֵ֣ין מַצִּֽיל׃	Now consider this, ye that forget God, lest I tear you in pieces, and there be none to deliver.	σύνετε δὴ ταῦτα, οἱ ἐπιλανθανόμενοι τοῦ Θεοῦ, μήποτε ἁρπάσῃ, καὶ οὐ μὴ ᾖ ὁ ῥυόμενος.
23	זֹבֵ֥חַ תּוֹדָ֗ה יְֽכַ֫בְּדָ֥נְנִי וְשָׂ֥ם דֶּ֑רֶךְ אַ֝רְאֶ֗נּוּ בְּיֵ֣שַׁע אֱלֹהִֽים׃	Whoso offereth praise glorifieth me: and to him that ordereth his conversation aright will I shew the salvation of God.	θυσία αἰνέσεως δοξάσει με, καὶ ἐκεῖ ὁδός, ᾗ δείξω αὐτῷ τὸ σωτήριόν μου.

The psalm can be divided into an introduction (verses 1-6), two separate orations in which God testifies against the Jews (verses 7-15 and 16-21), and a conclusion (verses 22-23). The imagery of the introduction evokes the revelation of the Ten Commandments at Mount Sinai, where God's appearance was accompanied by thunder and lightning. God summons the heavens and the earth to act as witnesses, and the rest of the psalm takes the form of a legal proceeding, with God acting as both plaintiff and judge. The same metaphor of a divine tribunal occurs in chapter 1 of the Book of Isaiah and chapter 6 of the Book of Micah.

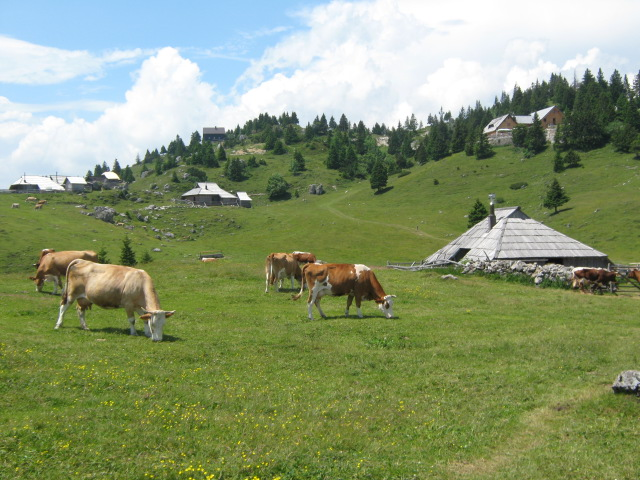
Cattle grazing in a high-elevation environment at the Big Pasture Plateau, Slovenia: cf. verse 10: The cattle on a thousand hills are mine.

In God's first oration, he tells the people that he is not satisfied with material sacrifices alone, since he does not require food or drink. Rather, he desires his people to worship him with thanksgiving and sincere prayer. Verse 13, "Do I eat the flesh of bulls, or drink the blood of goats?" may be an allusion to the goddess Anat, since in one fragmentary text Anat eats the flesh and drinks the blood of her brother Baal, who sometimes appears as a bull.

God's second oration is warning against hypocrisy. Though the hypocrites often recite God's commandments, they inwardly hate them and make no effort to live by them, and God will surely bring them to judgment.

The psalm closes with a final warning against iniquity and a promise that God will bless the righteous and make them "drink deeply of the salvation of God". This last is an appearance of the common biblical theme of the "Messianic banquet," which also occurs in Psalm 23, Psalm 16, and Luke 14, among other places.

== Bibliography ==
- Dahood, Mitchell (1966). Psalms I: 1-50. Anchor Bible Series. Garden City, New York: Doubleday & Company.
- Kirkpatrick, A. F. (1901). The Book of Psalms. The Cambridge Bible for Schools and Colleges. Cambridge University Press.
- Rhodes, Arnold B. (1960). The Book of Psalms. The Layman's Bible Commentary. Richmond, Virginia: John Knox Press. ISBN 9780804230094.
