= Plus ultra =

National motto of Spain

The coat of arms of Spain, flanked by the Pillars of Hercules bearing the motto plus ultra

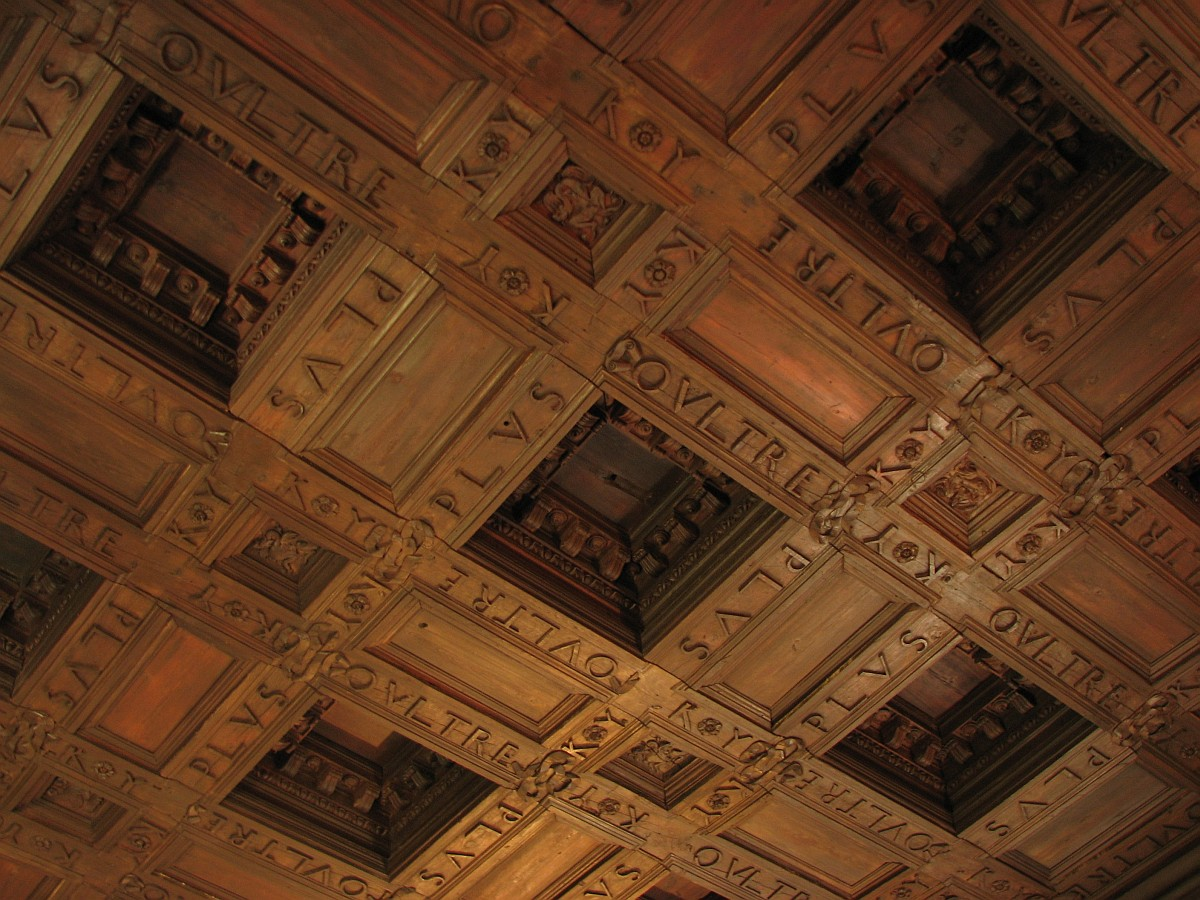
Wooden panelling in Charles V's palace in the Alhambra

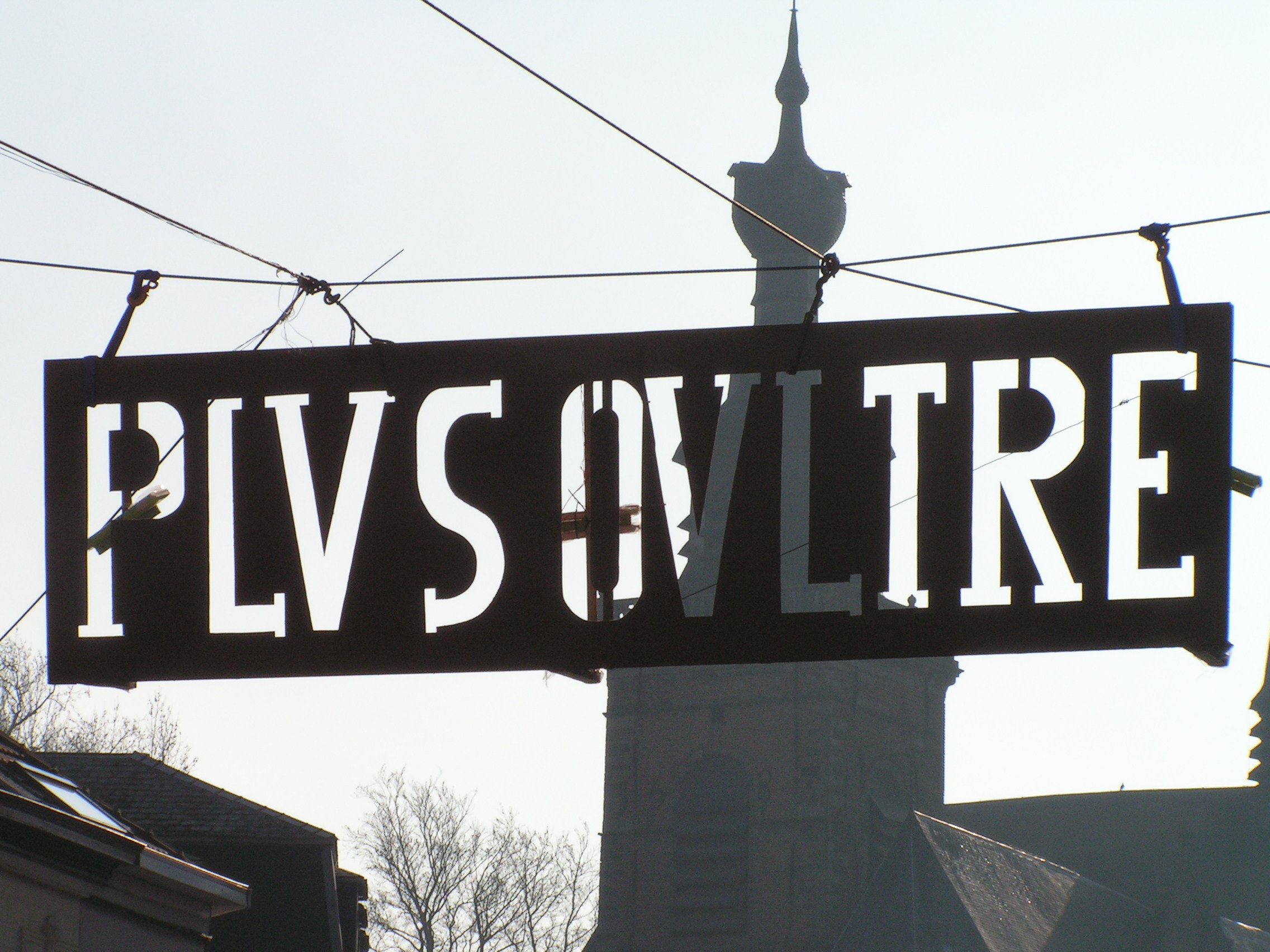
Motto of the city of Binche, Belgium

Plus ultra (Latin: [pluːs ˈʊltraː]; Spanish: [plus ˈultɾa]; lit. 'Further beyond') is a Latin phrase and the national motto of Spain. A reversal of the original phrase non plus ultra ('nothing further beyond'), said to have been inscribed as a warning on the Pillars of Hercules at the Strait of Gibraltar (which marked the edge of the known world in antiquity), it has metaphorical suggestions of taking risks and striving for excellence. Its original version, the personal motto of the Holy Roman Emperor Charles V, also Duke of Burgundy and King of Spain, was Plus oultre in French. It appears on the columns of the Spanish coat of arms, in reference to the discovery of the New World.

== History ==
Plus oultre, French for "further beyond", was adopted by the young Duke of Burgundy and new King of Spain Charles of Habsburg as his personal motto, at the suggestion of his adviser Luigi Marliano, an Italian physician, in 1516. It was emblematic of Marliano's vision of a Christian empire spanning beyond the boundaries of the Old World, now that Charles also controlled territories in the New World through the Spanish crown. It was also associated with the desire to bring the Reconquista past Gibraltar into North Africa and revive the crusades of the chivalric tradition. The motto is first recorded on the back of Charles's chair in the church of St Gudule, Brussels. Spaniards translated the original French into Latin due to the hostility they bore for the French-speaking Burgundian advisors and ministers Charles brought with him to Spain from the Low Countries. At Charles's entry into Burgos in 1520, an arch was set up bearing on one side, "Plus ultra", and on the other "All of Africa weeps because it knows that you have the key [Gibraltar] and have to be its master". Plus oultre continued to be used in the Burgundian Low Countries and also appeared in the wooden panelling of Charles's palace in Granada. As a consequence of Charles's election as Holy Roman Emperor, both the French Plus oultre and the Latin Plus ultra began to be used in Italy and Germany, together with a less successful German translation, Noch Weiter. In Spain, the Latin motto continued to be popular after Charles V's death. It appeared in Habsburg propaganda and was used to encourage Spanish explorers to ignore the old warning and go beyond the Pillars of Hercules. Today it is featured on the coat of arms of Spain.

== Other uses ==
- The French built the Lines of Ne Plus Ultra which they hoped would stop the army of the Duke of Marlborough during the 1711 campaigning season in the War of Spanish Succession, but his army breached them without loss.
- The motto is used by the Mexican state of Veracruz as part of its flag.
- It is the motto of the 30th Degree of Scottish Rite Freemasonry.
- The motto is used by a number of institutions around the world, including the National University of San Marcos, the University of Mexico, Shepherd University, the Colombian Navy, St Peters Lutheran College in Indooroopilly, Queensland, Trompsburg Primary School, Malden Catholic High School in Malden, Massachusetts, and Immanuel College (Australia) in Adelaide, South Australia. The French version, Plus oultre, is used as the motto of the Belgian city Binche and the US Air Force Academy's 15th Cadet Squadron. Charles V was born in Ghent, Flanders and as a result the motto is also used in this region.
- The English philosopher Sir Francis Bacon used “plus ultra” as his personal motto.
- In 1926 a crew of Spanish aviators including Ramón Franco and Julio Ruiz de Alda Miqueleiz completed the first transatlantic flight between Spain and South America on a seaplane named the Plus Ultra. 1930 saw the formation of a Madrid-based football team AD Plus Ultra, which eventually developed into Real Madrid Castilla.
- The Plus Ultra Brigade, composed of troops from five Spanish-speaking countries (Spain, the Dominican Republic, Nicaragua, Honduras, and El Salvador), served in the Iraq War in 2003.
- The motto is written on the wall tiles of the cloak room at Mar-a-Lago, a resort in Florida that has been owned by Donald Trump since 1985 and his principal residence since 2019.
- The motto appears frequently in popular culture.

- In the manga and anime series My Hero Academia, it is used as the motto of the hero academy U.A. High School.
- The light novel series The Saga of Tanya the Evil, which uses Latin phrases and mottos for most of its titles, uses it as the name of the second volume.
- In the 2015 movie Tomorrowland, the Plus Ultra Society is the name of the fictional group of people responsible for creating a better tomorrow, whose founding members were Gustave Eiffel, Nikola Tesla, Thomas Edison, and Jules Verne.
- The motto is seen tattooed on the arm of Octane, one of the playable characters in the 2019 videogame Apex Legends, and Non terrae plus ultra is one of his possible voice lines entering a battle.
- The motto is seen on several tiles of the Fonthill Castle, the home of Henry Chapman Mercer, the eccentric owner of the Mercer Tile company, located in Doylestown, Pennsylvania, USA.

== See also ==
- A.E.I.O.U., the motto of the Habsburgs, which is often understood as "All the world is subject to Austria" (Alles Erdreich ist Österreich untertan in German or Austriae est imperare orbi universo in Latin), and shares a similar spirit with Plus ultra.
- A solis ortu usque ad occasum (English: From sunrise to sunset), another quote from the Spanish Coat of Arms
- List of national mottos
