= A solis ortu usque ad occasum =

Latin motto meaning "from sunrise to sunset"

Ornamented version of the royal coat of arms of the Kings of Spain from Carlos III to Alfonso XIII, where the motto can be seen. Other Spanish mottoes appearing are SANTIAGO and PLVS VLTRA.

A solis ortu usque ad occasum is a Latin heraldic motto roughly meaning "From sunrise to sunset". Inspired by the Biblical passage of Psalm 113:3, (Note: The phrase can also be quoted verbatim in Psalm 112:3 of the Latin Vulgate, see also Psalm 49:1 in the Vulgate, Psalm 50:1 in most English versions) it can be interpreted as the sentiment of the monarch's dominion over lands across the world, similar to how the Spanish Empire and later the British Empire were called the "empire[s] on which the sun never sets", the latter still being technically accurate as of 2022.

Most often cited in the coat of arms of many former Kings of Spain above the crest, it is distinctive in its placement above the crest similar to the Scottish style in slogans versus placement below the escutcheon or order if present. With this element it was intended to manifest that the sun did not set in the dominions of the Spanish Empire, since these were located in both hemispheres. This motto echoed a famous phrase, "en mis dominios no se pone el sol" (in my dominions the sun does not set), attributed to King Philip II.

The ornamented version of the royal arms with the Castilian Royal Crest fell into disuse in the 19th century.

== See also ==
- Coat of arms of Spain
- Plus Ultra
- Castilian Royal Crest
- Latin phrases
