= La Venexiana =

La Venexiana (founded 1995) is an Italian early music ensemble founded and led by Claudio Cavina, an Italian countertenor and conductor.

Cavina studied in Bologna with the American singer and musicologist Candace Smith, and then with the Swiss baritone Kurt Widmer and Belgian countertenor and conductor René Jacobs at the Schola Cantorum Basiliensis, then appeared regularly as a countertenor soloist and in choral works. La Venexiana, taking its name from an anonymous comedy La Venexiana ("The Venetian Girl", c.1537), was created to focus on the core four- and five-voice madrigal repertory of Sigismondo d'India, Luzzasco Luzzaschi, Luca Marenzio, Barbara Strozzi, Gesualdo da Venosa, and Claudio Monteverdi. The ensemble has later broadened to be the base of Cavina's productions and recordings of operas by Monteverdi and Francesco Cavalli.

With Cavina's increasing focus on opera, members of the ensemble have concurrently formed La Compagnia del Madrigale which has continued the Gesualdo series on the Glossa label.

== Discography ==
- 1992 – Luzzasco Luzzaschi: Concerto delle Dame
- 1996 – Marcello: Arias and Duets
- 1997 – Barbara Strozzi: Primo Libra de' Madrigali (1644)
- 1998 – Amori e Ombre: Duets and Catatas
- 1999 – Handel: The 10 Italian Duets
- 1999 – Claudio Monteverdi, Luca Morenzio, Sigismondo D'India, Luzzasco Luzzaschi: Madrigali
- 1999 – Monteverdi: Settimo Libro di Madrigali
- 1999 – Luzzaschi: Quinto Libro de' Madrigali
- 1999 – Marenzio: Ninth Book of Madrigals
- 1999 – Sigismondo d'India: Terzo Libro de Madrigali
- 2001 – Sigismondo d'India: Primo Libro de Madrigali
- 2001 – Marenzio: Il Sesto Libro de Madrigali
- 2002 – Monteverdi: Terzo Libro
- 2003 – Giaches de Wert: La Gerusalemme Liberata
- 2003 – La Venexiana Live! Madrigals by Claudio Monteverdi
- 2004 – Monteverdi: Quarto Libro dei Madrigali
- 2004 – Monteverdi: Secondo Libro dei Madrigali (1590)
- 2005 – Gesualdo: Quinto Libro di Madrigali (1611)
- 2005 – Monteverdi: Sesto Libro dei Madrigali (1614)
- 2005 – Monteverdi: Ottavo Libra dei Madrigali: Madrigali Geurrieri et Amorosi
- 2006 – Gesualdo: Quarto libro de Madrigali
- 2007 – Monteverdi: L'Orfeo
- 2007 – Monteverdi: Quinto Libro dei Madrigali
- 2008 – Monteverdi: Libri dei Madrigali, Books 1 and 9
- 2008 – Monteverdi: Terzo Libro dei Madrigali
- 2008 – Monteverdi: Selva morale e spirituale
- 2009 – Monteverdi: Scherzi Musicali
- 2010 – Monteverdi: Il Nerone, ossia L'incoronazione di Poppea
- 2011 – 'Round M: Monteverdi Meets Jazz
- 2011 – Cavalli: Artemisia
- 2011 – Luzzaschi – Concerto della Dame
- 2012 – Monteverdi: Il ritorno d'Ulisse in Patria
