= La Compagnia del Madrigale =

La Compagnia del Madrigale is an Italian virtuoso early music vocal ensemble specializing in the Italian madrigal. The ensemble includes several members of La Venexiana and has continued that ensemble's Gesualdo recordings on Glossa Records.

The ensemble at the time of the Glossa recordings comprised: Rossana Bertini, Francesca Cassinari, sopranos, Elena Carzaniga, contralto, Giuseppe Maletto, Raffaele Giordani, tenors, Marco Scavazza, baritone, Daniele Carnovich, bass.

== Discography ==
- Orlando Furioso: Madrigali sul poema di Ludovico Ariosto - Madrigals by Hoste da Reggio, Orlando di Lasso, William Byrd, Benedetto Pallavicino, Giaches de Wert, Cipriano de Rore, Vincenzo Ruffo, Philippe Verdelot, Bartolomeo Tromboncino, Alfonso Ferrabosco, Alessandro Striggio, Giovanni Palestrina, and Andrea Gabrieli. Arcana Records
- Gesualdo: Sixth Book of Madrigals, Glossa
- Marenzio: First Book of Madrigals, Glossa
- Marenzio: Fifth Book of Madrigals, Glossa
- Tenebrae Responsoria (Gesualdo) 3CD Glossa
