= Rheinau Psalter =

The Nativity (fol. 8v)

The Rheinau Psalter (or Rheinauer Psalter), now shelfmark Rh. 167 in the Zentralbibliothek Zürich, is a 13th-century illuminated manuscript of the Latin Psalter. It is one of the most valuable manuscripts in the Zentralbibliothek and its illustrations of the highest calibre of Gothic art. It was commissioned in the region around Lake Constance about 1260, during the Great Interregnum. It was acquired by Rheinau Abbey in 1817 and became part of the Zentralbibliothek in 1863. A facsimile edition was published in 2013.

The Rheinau Psalter originally contained thirteen full-page miniatures depicting the life of Christ. Three of them have been removed and are lost, leaving ten. There is also one full-page historiated initial, nine very large decorated initials and numerous smaller decorated initials. Each psalm without a historiated or very large initial begins with a golden or silver initial and each verse begins with a capital letter in red or blue (lapis lazuli). The regular script is textualis in black ink. The quality of the script is good but does not rise to the level of the painting and illumination. The palette is distinctive and there is detailing in both gold and silver.

Besides the 150 canonical psalms, the manuscript contains a calendar, various canticles and a litany. The canticles are Confitebor, Cantemus Domino, Audite caeli, Benedicite, Benedictus, Magnificat, Nunc dimittis, Te Deum, Pater noster, the Apostles' Creed (which the text calls Canticum Babyloniae) and the Athanasian Creed (which the text calls Catholica fide).

== Works cited ==
- Hollaender, Albert (1943). "The Sarum Illuminator and His School". Wiltshire Archaeological and Natural History Magazine. 50 (179): 230–262.
- Oltrogge, Doris; Fuchs, Robert; Eggenberger, Christoph; Stähli, Marlis, eds. (2013). Der Rheinauer Psalter: Meisterwerk der Buchmalerei um 1260. Quaternio Verlag Luzern.
