= Psalm 113 =

Biblical psalm

- "Praise ye the Lord, O ye servants of the Lord"
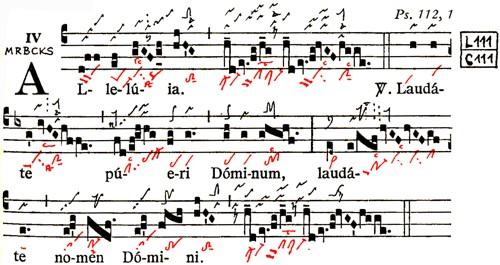
- Beginning of the "Hallelujah" in the Graduale Triplex, 1979
- Other name: Psalm 112 (Vulgate); "Laudate pueri Dominum"
- Language: Hebrew (original)

Psalm 113
- ← Psalm 112 Psalm 114 →
- Book: Book of Psalms
- Hebrew Bible part: Ketuvim
- Order in the Hebrew part: 1
- Category: Sifrei Emet
- Christian Bible part: Old Testament
- Order in the Christian part: 19

Psalm 113 is the 113th psalm of the Book of Psalms, beginning in English in the King James Version: "Praise ye the Lord, O ye servants of the Lord". The Book of Psalms is part of the third section of the Hebrew Bible, and a book of the Christian Old Testament. In Latin, it is known as 'Laudate pueri Dominum".

In the slightly different numbering system used in the Greek Septuagint version of the bible and in the Latin Vulgate, this psalm is Psalm 112.

The psalm forms a regular part of Jewish, Catholic, Lutheran, Anglican and other Protestant liturgies. In Judaism, it is the first of the six psalms comprising the Hallel, a prayer of praise and thanksgiving recited on Rosh Chodesh (the first day of the Hebrew month) and Jewish holidays. In Catholicism, it is one of the psalms included in the vespers service. It has been set to music often, notably by Claudio Monteverdi in his Vespro della Beata Vergine of 1610.

== Uses ==
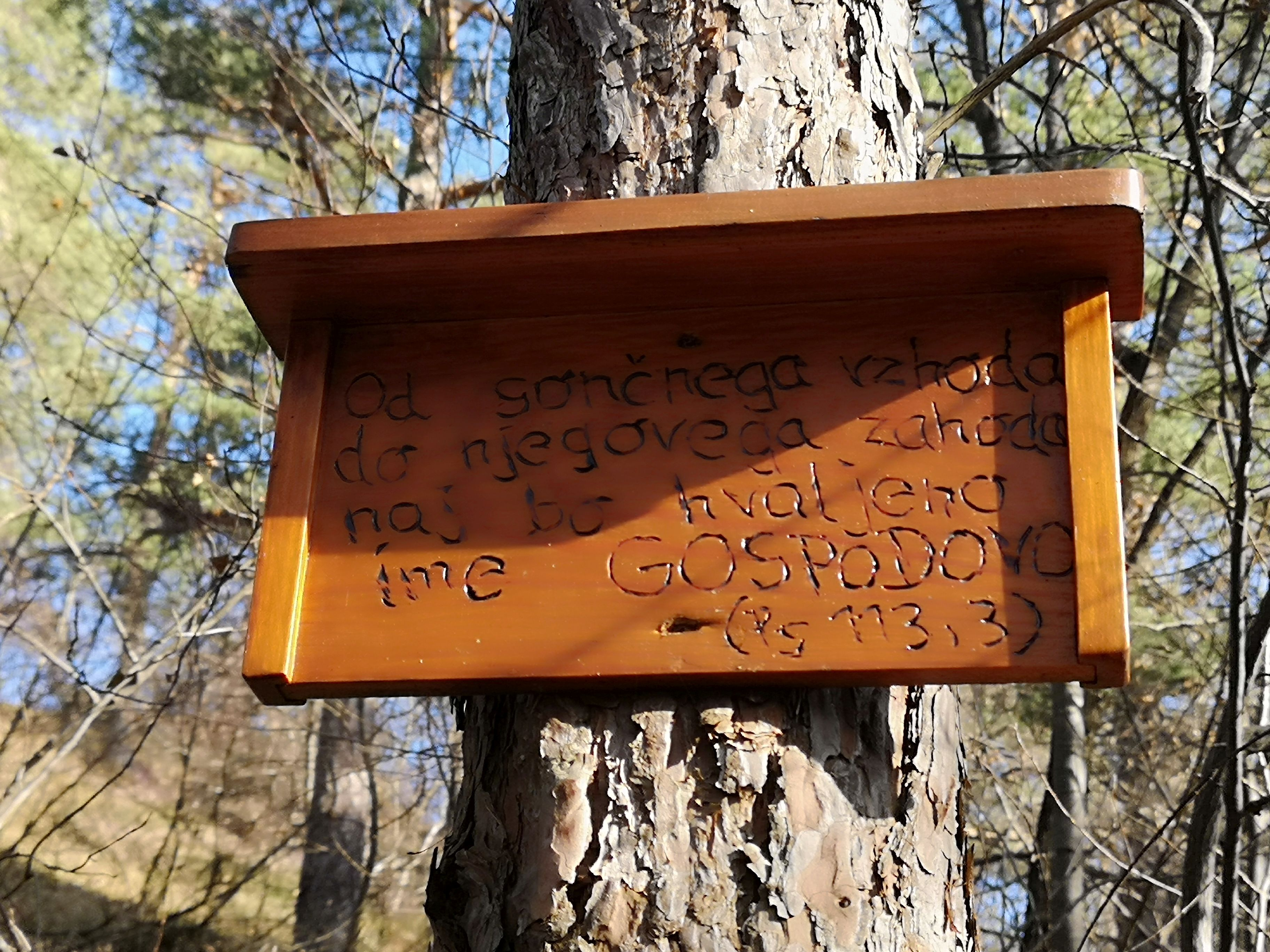
Wooden board with psalm 113:3 on the trail to Lindek Castle. Text: "From the rising of the sun to the place where it sets, the name of the Lord is to be praised."

=== Judaism ===
- "Hallel" means praise in Hebrew. Psalm 113 is the first of six psalms (113–118) of which Hallel is composed. On all days when Hallel is recited, this psalm is recited in its entirety.
- It is one of the so-called Egyptian Hallel, called Egyptian Hallel because Psalm 114 (one of the Hallel psalms 113 to 118) refers to the leaving of Egypt, but all the psalms are divinely inspired writings by King David.
- Verse 2 is part of Baruch Hashem L'Olam during Maariv, the mezuman preceding Birkat Hamazon, is recited when opening the Hakafot on Simchat Torah, and is found in the repetition of the Mussaf Amidah on Rosh Hashanah.
- Verses 2–4 are the second thru fourth verses of Yehi Kivod of Pesukei Dezimra.

=== Book of Common Prayer ===
In the Church of England's Book of Common Prayer, this psalm is appointed to be read on the morning of the twenty-third day of the month, as well as at Evensong on Easter Day.

=== Coptic Orthodox Church ===
In the Agpeya, the Coptic Church's book of hours, this psalm is prayed in the offices of Prime and None.

== Musical settings ==
Heinrich Schütz composed a metred paraphrase of Psalm 113 in German, "Lobet, ihr Knecht, den Herren", SWV 211, for the Becker Psalter, published first in 1628.

This psalm has been set to music often, as it is one of the psalms included in vespers, typically set in Latin as Laudate pueri Dominum. Claudio Monteverdi wrote a setting in his Vespro della Beata Vergine, published in 1610. Mozart set the text in his two vespers compositions, Vesperae solennes de Dominica, K. 321, and Vesperae solennes de confessore, K. 339.

Individual settings of the psalm include two by Marc-Antoine Charpentier (H.149, H.203, H.203 a), five by Antonio Vivaldi, RV 600–603. Handel set it twice, a setting in F major which is his earliest extant autograph which may have been written as early as 1701/02 in Halle, HWV 236, and a setting composed in D major in Rome in 1707, HWV 237. Jan Dismas Zelenka wrote two settings, both for a single soloist, trumpet and orchestra, ZWV 81 (1729) and ZWV 82 (1725). In 1830, Mendelssohn set the psalm as one of 3 Motets for female choir and organ, Op. 39, No. 2.

In 1863, Bruckner set the psalm in German, Psalm 112 Alleluja! Lobet den Herrn, ihr Diener, WAB 35. Modern settings include one for three choirs by Kenneth Leighton, Op. 68 (1973).

== Text ==
The following table shows the Hebrew text of the Psalm with vowels, alongside the Koine Greek text in the Septuagint and the English translation from the King James Version. Note that the meaning can slightly differ between these versions, as the Septuagint and the Masoretic Text come from different textual traditions. (Note: A 1917 translation directly from Hebrew to English by the Jewish Publication Society can be found here or here, and an 1844 translation directly from the Septuagint by L. C. L. Brenton can be found here. Both translations are in the public domain.) In the Septuagint, this psalm is numbered Psalm 112.

#	Hebrew	English	Greek
1	הַ֥לְלוּ־יָ֨הּ ׀ הַ֭לְלוּ עַבְדֵ֣י יְהֹוָ֑ה הַֽ֝לְל֗וּ אֶת־שֵׁ֥ם יְהֹוָֽה׃	Praise ye the LORD. Praise, O ye servants of the LORD, praise the name of the LORD.	᾿Αλληλούϊα. - ΑΙΝΕΙΤΕ, παῖδες, Κύριον, αἰνεῖτε τὸ ὄνομα Κυρίου·
2	יְהִ֤י שֵׁ֣ם יְהֹוָ֣ה מְבֹרָ֑ךְ מֵ֝עַתָּ֗ה וְעַד־עוֹלָֽם׃	Blessed be the name of the LORD from this time forth and for evermore.	εἴη τὸ ὄνομα Κυρίου εὐλογημένον ἀπὸ τοῦ νῦν καὶ ἕως τοῦ αἰῶνος.
3	מִמִּזְרַח־שֶׁ֥מֶשׁ עַד־מְבוֹא֑וֹ מְ֝הֻלָּ֗ל שֵׁ֣ם יְהֹוָֽה׃	From the rising of the sun unto the going down of the same the LORD's name is to be praised.	ἀπὸ ἀνατολῶν ἡλίου μέχρι δυσμῶν αἰνετὸν τὸ ὄνομα Κυρίου.
4	רָ֖ם עַל־כׇּל־גּוֹיִ֥ם ׀ יְהֹוָ֑ה עַ֖ל הַשָּׁמַ֣יִם כְּבוֹדֽוֹ׃	The LORD is high above all nations, and his glory above the heavens.	ὑψηλὸς ἐπὶ πάντα τὰ ἔθνη ὁ Κύριος, ἐπὶ τοὺς οὐρανοὺς ἡ δόξα αὐτοῦ.
5	מִ֭י כַּיהֹוָ֣ה אֱלֹהֵ֑ינוּ הַֽמַּגְבִּיהִ֥י לָשָֽׁבֶת	Who is like unto the LORD our God, who dwelleth on high,	τίς ὡς Κύριος ὁ Θεὸς ἡμῶν; ὁ ἐν ὑψηλοῖς κατοικῶν
6	הַֽמַּשְׁפִּילִ֥י לִרְא֑וֹת בַּשָּׁמַ֥יִם וּבָאָֽרֶץ׃	Who humbleth himself to behold the things that are in heaven, and in the earth!	καὶ τὰ ταπεινὰ ἐφορῶν ἐν τῷ οὐρανῷ καὶ ἐν τῇ γῇ,
7	מְקִ֥ימִ֣י מֵעָפָ֣ר דָּ֑ל מֵ֝אַשְׁפֹּ֗ת יָרִ֥ים אֶבְיֽוֹן׃	He raiseth up the poor out of the dust, and lifteth the needy out of the dunghill;	ὁ ἐγείρων ἀπὸ γῆς πτωχὸν καὶ ἀπὸ κοπρίας ἀνυψῶν πένητα
8	לְהוֹשִׁיבִ֥י עִם־נְדִיבִ֑ים עִ֝֗ם נְדִיבֵ֥י עַמּֽוֹ׃	That he may set him with princes, even with the princes of his people.	τοῦ καθίσαι αὐτὸν μετὰ ἀρχόντων, μετὰ ἀρχόντων λαοῦ αὐτοῦ·
9	מֽוֹשִׁיבִ֨י ׀ עֲקֶ֬רֶת הַבַּ֗יִת אֵֽם־הַבָּנִ֥ים שְׂמֵחָ֗ה הַֽלְלוּ־יָֽהּ׃	He maketh the barren woman to keep house, and to be a joyful mother of children. Praise ye the LORD.	ὁ κατοικίζων στεῖραν ἐν οἴκῳ, μητέρα ἐπὶ τέκνοις εὐφραινομένην.

=== Verse 1 ===
Praise the Lord! or Hallelujah
Praise, O servants of the Lord,
Praise the name of the Lord!

In the Douay-Rheims 1899 American Edition, the wording reads Praise the Lord, ye children: praise ye the name of the Lord, from the Latin pueri, literally meaning "boys". Methodist writer Joseph Benson suggests there is a special emphasis in calling the Levites to praise, as they "are peculiarly devoted to this solemn work, and sometimes termed God’s servants, in a special sense", along with a general call to congregation.

=== Verse 3 ===
"From the rising of the sun unto the going down of the same" appears similarly in Psalm 50:1. The Vulgate Latin translation A solis ortu usque ad occasum is a heraldic motto.

== Sources ==
- Mazor, Lea (2011). Berlin, Adele; Grossman, Maxine (eds.). Book of Psalms. The Oxford Dictionary of the Jewish Religion. Oxford University Press. ISBN 978-0-19-973004-9.
