= Psalm 112 =

112th psalm of the book of psalms

- "Praise ye the LORD. Blessed is the man that feareth the LORD"
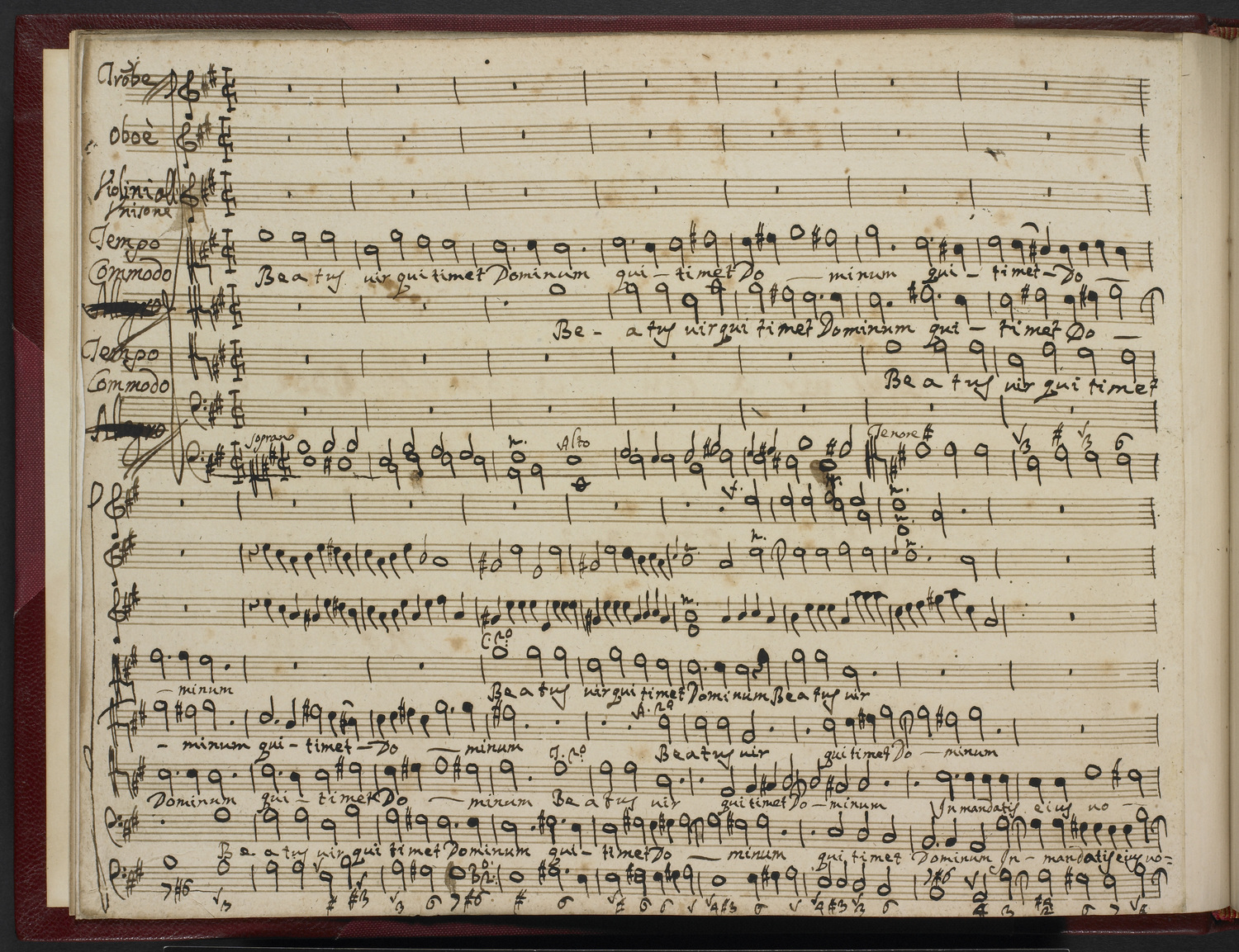
- Beginning of a setting in Latin by Carlo Cotumacci
- Other name: Psalm 111; "Beatus vir qui timet Dominum"
- Language: Hebrew (original)

Psalm 112
- ← Psalm 111 Psalm 113 →
- Book: Book of Psalms
- Hebrew Bible part: Ketuvim
- Order in the Hebrew part: 1
- Category: Sifrei Emet
- Christian Bible part: Old Testament
- Order in the Christian part: 19

Psalm 112 is the 112th psalm of the Book of Psalms, beginning in English in the King James Version: "Praise ye the LORD. Blessed is the man that feareth the LORD". In the slightly different numbering system used in the Greek Septuagint and Latin Vulgate translations of the Bible, this psalm is Psalm 111. In Latin, it is known as Beatus vir qui timet Dominum. It is a psalm "in praise of the virtuous". This psalm, along with Psalm 111, is acrostic by phrase, that is, each 7-9 syllable phrase begins with a letter of the Hebrew alphabet in order.

The psalm forms a regular part of Jewish, Catholic, Lutheran, Anglican and other Protestant liturgies. Musical settings abound, as the psalm was a common part of Vespers, such as Monteverdi's 1610 Vespro della Beata Vergine and Mozart's Vesperae de Dominica and Vesperae solennes de confessore (K. 339). Górecki composed Beatus Vir as an extended work for baritone, choir and orchestra in 1979.

== Uses ==
=== New Testament ===
In the New Testament, verse 9 is quoted in 2 Corinthians 9:9.

=== Judaism ===
The psalm begins הַלְלוּ-יָהּ:אַשְׁרֵי-אִישׁ, יָרֵא אֶת-יְהוָה; בְּמִצְו‍ֹתָיו, חָפֵץ מְאֹד.

=== Catholic Church ===
Saint Benedict of Nursia attributed the psalms from the Psalm 110 at the services of Vespers, in its Rule of St. Benedict set to 530 AD. So this psalm was traditionally recited or sung during the solemn service of Vespers on Sunday between the Psalm 111 and Psalm 113.

In ordinary Roman rite, Psalm 112 is currently the reading of the fifth Sunday in Ordinary Time. Moreover, in the Liturgy of the Hours enacted in 1970, the psalm is still recited at Vespers of Sunday's fourth week and evening of the Solemnity of the Epiphany.

=== Coptic Orthodox Church ===
In the Agpeya, the Coptic Church's book of hours, this psalm is prayed in the office of None.

== Musical settings ==
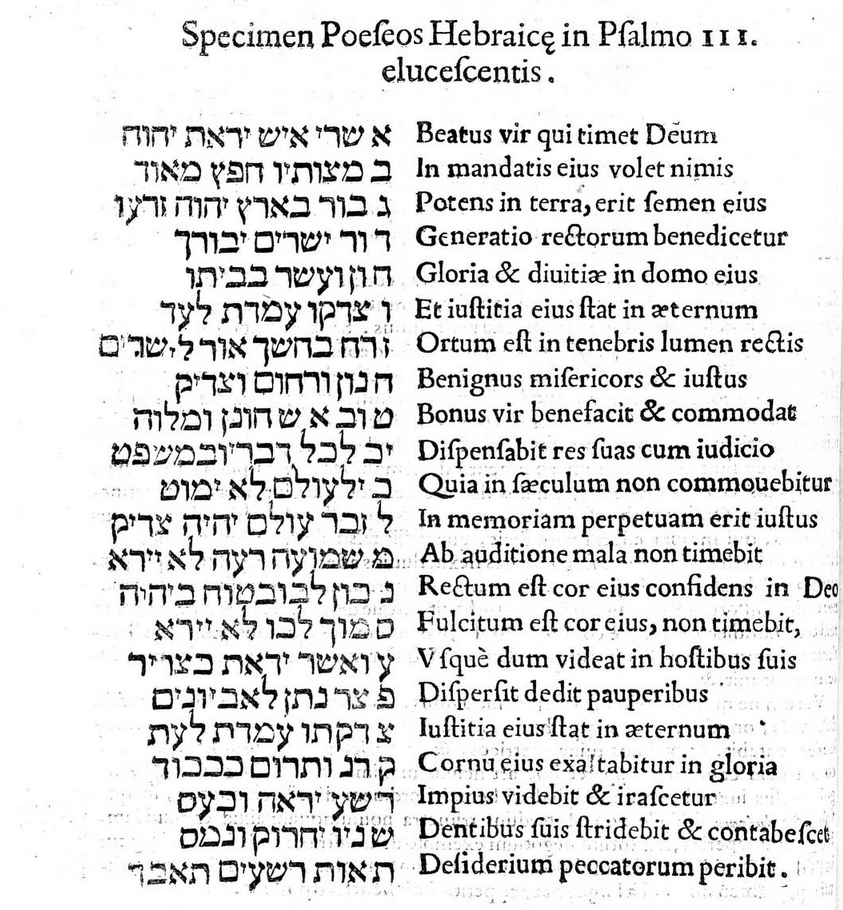
Psalm 112 in Hebrew and Latin. Musurgia universalis, sive Ars magna Consoni et Dissoni, in X libros digesta, t.1

Heinrich Schütz composed a metred paraphrase of Psalm 112 in German, "Der ist fürwahr ein selig Mann", SWV 210, for the Becker Psalter, published first in 1628.

The Latin text was set to music by many composers of different nationalities, such as the French Michel-Richard Delalande and André Campra. Marc-Antoine Charpentier composed five different "Beatus vir qui timet Dominum", H.154, H.199-H.199a, H.208, H.221, H.224 between 1670 and 1695, François Giroust, one setting (1777) and many other composers also set these words. Beatus vir is the title of many musical settings for Vespers, such as in Monteverdi's 1610 Vespro della Beata Vergine and 1640 Selva morale e spirituale, Vivaldi's Beatus Vir, and the third movement of Mozart's Vesperae de Dominica (K. 321) and Vesperae solennes de confessore (K. 339).

Górecki composed Beatus Vir, Op. 38, for baritone, large mixed chorus and grand orchestra in 1979.

== Text ==
The following table shows the Hebrew text of the Psalm with vowels, alongside the Koine Greek text in the Septuagint and the English translation from the King James Version. Note that the meaning can slightly differ between these versions, as the Septuagint and the Masoretic Text come from different textual traditions. (Note: A 1917 translation directly from Hebrew to English by the Jewish Publication Society can be found here or here, and an 1844 translation directly from the Septuagint by L. C. L. Brenton can be found here. Both translations are in the public domain.) In the Septuagint, this psalm is numbered Psalm 111.

#	Hebrew	English	Greek
1	הַ֥לְלוּ־יָ֨הּ ׀ אַשְׁרֵי־אִ֭ישׁ יָרֵ֣א אֶת־יְהֹוָ֑ה בְּ֝מִצְוֺתָ֗יו חָפֵ֥ץ מְאֹֽד׃	Praise ye the LORD. Blessed is the man that feareth the LORD, that delighteth greatly in his commandments.	᾿Αλληλούϊα. - ΜΑΚΑΡΙΟΣ ἀνὴρ ὁ φοβούμενος τὸν Κύριον, ἐν ταῖς ἐντολαῖς αὐτοῦ θελήσει σφόδρα·
2	גִּבּ֣וֹר בָּ֭אָרֶץ יִהְיֶ֣ה זַרְע֑וֹ דּ֖וֹר יְשָׁרִ֣ים יְבֹרָֽךְ׃	His seed shall be mighty upon earth: the generation of the upright shall be blessed.	δυνατὸν ἐν τῇ γῇ ἔσται τὸ σπέρμα αὐτοῦ, γενεὰ εὐθέων εὐλογηθήσεται.
3	הוֹן־וָעֹ֥שֶׁר בְּבֵית֑וֹ וְ֝צִדְקָת֗וֹ עֹמֶ֥דֶת לָעַֽד׃	Wealth and riches shall be in his house: and his righteousness endureth for ever.	δόξα καὶ πλοῦτος ἐν τῷ οἴκῳ αὐτοῦ, καὶ ἡ δικαιοσύνη αὐτοῦ μένει εἰς τὸν αἰῶνα τοῦ αἰῶνος.
4	זָ֘רַ֤ח בַּחֹ֣שֶׁךְ א֭וֹר לַיְשָׁרִ֑ים חַנּ֖וּן וְרַח֣וּם וְצַדִּֽיק׃	Unto the upright there ariseth light in the darkness: he is gracious, and full of compassion, and righteous.	ἐξανέτειλεν ἐν σκότει φῶς τοῖς εὐθέσιν ἐλεήμων καὶ οἰκτίρμων καὶ δίκαιος.
5	טֽוֹב־אִ֭ישׁ חוֹנֵ֣ן וּמַלְוֶ֑ה יְכַלְכֵּ֖ל דְּבָרָ֣יו בְּמִשְׁפָּֽט׃	A good man sheweth favour, and lendeth: he will guide his affairs with discretion.	χρηστὸς ἀνὴρ ὁ οἰκτείρων καὶ κιχρῶν· οἰκονομήσει τοὺς λόγους αὐτοῦ ἐν κρίσει,
6	כִּֽי־לְעוֹלָ֥ם לֹֽא־יִמּ֑וֹט לְזֵ֥כֶר ע֝וֹלָ֗ם יִהְיֶ֥ה צַדִּֽיק׃	Surely he shall not be moved for ever: the righteous shall be in everlasting remembrance.	ὅτι εἰς τὸν αἰῶνα οὐ σαλευθήσεται, εἰς μνημόσυνον αἰώνιον ἔσται δίκαιος.
7	מִשְּׁמוּעָ֣ה רָ֭עָה לֹ֣א יִירָ֑א נָכ֥וֹן לִ֝בּ֗וֹ בָּטֻ֥חַ בַּיהֹוָֽה׃	He shall not be afraid of evil tidings: his heart is fixed, trusting in the LORD.	ἀπὸ ἀκοῆς πονηρᾶς οὐ φοβηθήσεται· ἑτοίμη ἡ καρδία αὐτοῦ ἐλπίζειν ἐπὶ Κύριον.
8	סָמ֣וּךְ לִ֭בּוֹ לֹ֣א יִירָ֑א עַ֖ד אֲשֶׁר־יִרְאֶ֣ה בְצָרָֽיו׃	His heart is established, he shall not be afraid, until he see his desire upon his enemies.	ἐστήρικται ἡ καρδία αὐτοῦ, οὐ μὴ φοβηθῇ, ἕως οὗ ἐπίδῃ ἐπὶ τοὺς ἐχθροὺς αὐτοῦ·
9	פִּזַּ֤ר ׀ נָ֘תַ֤ן לָאֶבְיוֹנִ֗ים צִ֭דְקָתוֹ עֹמֶ֣דֶת לָעַ֑ד קַ֝רְנ֗וֹ תָּר֥וּם בְּכָבֽוֹד׃	He hath dispersed, he hath given to the poor; his righteousness endureth for ever; his horn shall be exalted with honour.	ἐσκόρπισεν, ἔδωκε τοῖς πένησιν· ἡ δικαιοσύνη αὐτοῦ μένει εἰς τὸν αἰῶνα τοῦ αἰῶνος, τὸ κέρας αὐτοῦ ὑψωθήσεται ἐν δόξῃ.
10	רָ֘שָׁ֤ע יִרְאֶ֨ה ׀ וְכָעָ֗ס שִׁנָּ֣יו יַחֲרֹ֣ק וְנָמָ֑ס תַּאֲוַ֖ת רְשָׁעִ֣ים תֹּאבֵֽד׃	The wicked shall see it, and be grieved; he shall gnash with his teeth, and melt away: the desire of the wicked shall perish.	ἁμαρτωλὸς ὄψεται καὶ ὀργισθήσεται, τοὺς ὀδόντας αὐτοῦ βρύξει καὶ τακήσεται· ἐπιθυμία ἁμαρτωλοῦ ἀπολεῖται.

=== Latin Vulgate ===
1. Beatus vir, qui timet Dominum, in mandatis ejus volet nimis.
2. Potens in terra erit semen ejus, generatio rectorum benedicetur.
3. Gloria et divitiae in domo ejus, et iustitia ejus manet in saeculum saeculi.
4. Exortum est in tenebris lumen rectis, misericors et miserator et iustus.
5. Iucundus homo, qui miseretur et commodat, disponet res suas in judicio,
6. quia in aeternum non commovebitur. In memoria aeterna erit iustus,
7. ab auditione mala non timebit. Paratum cor ejus, sperare in Domino,
8. confirmatum est cor eius, non commovebitur, donec despiciat inimicos suos.
9. Dispersit dedit pauperibus; justitia ejus manet in saeculum saeculi, cornu ejus exaltabitur in gloria.
10. Peccator videbit et irascetur, dentibus suis fremet et tabescet. Desiderium peccatorum peribit.
