= Psalm 111 =

111th psalm of the book of psalms

- "Praise ye the LORD. I will praise the LORD with my whole heart"
- Royal psalm
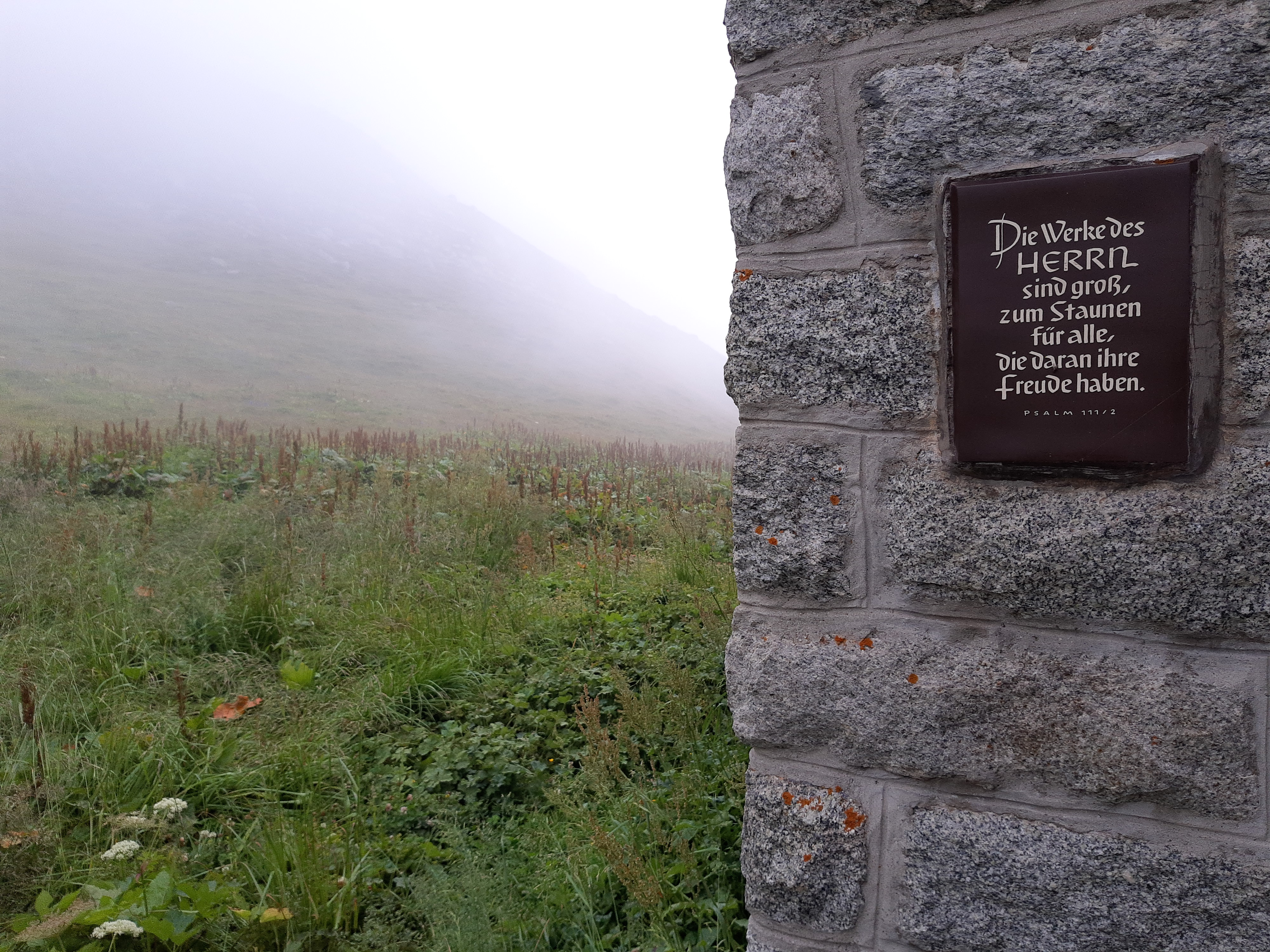
- Psalm 111:2 in German at Tiefenbach chapel near the Furka Pass
- Other name: Psalm 110; "Confitebor tibi Domine in toto corde meo"
- Language: Hebrew (original)

Psalm 111
- ← Psalm 110 Psalm 112 →
- Book: Book of Psalms
- Hebrew Bible part: Ketuvim
- Order in the Hebrew part: 1
- Category: Sifrei Emet
- Christian Bible part: Old Testament
- Order in the Christian part: 19

Psalm 111 is the 111th psalm of the Book of Psalms, beginning in English in the King James Version: "Praise ye the LORD. I will praise the LORD with my whole heart". In the slightly different numbering system used in the Greek Septuagint and Latin Vulgate translations of the Bible, this psalm is Psalm 110. In Latin, it is known as Confitebor tibi Domine. It is a psalm "in praise of the divine attributes". This psalm, along with Psalm 112, is acrostic by phrase, that is, each 7-9 syllable phrase begins with a letter of the Hebrew alphabet in order. Psalm 119 is also acrostic, with each eight-verse strophe commencing with a letter of the Hebrew alphabet in order. The Jerusalem Bible describes Psalm 112, "in praise of the virtuous", as "akin to this psalm in doctrine, style and poetic structure.

The psalm forms a regular part of Jewish, Catholic, Lutheran, Anglican and other Protestant liturgies. Musical settings include works by Heinrich Schütz in German, and Marc-Antoine Charpentier, Henri Desmarets and Giovanni Battista Pergolesi in Latin.

== Uses ==
=== New Testament ===
In the New Testament, Psalm 111 is quoted twice:

- Verse 9a is quoted in the Song of Zechariah in Luke 1:68.
- Verse 9c is quoted in Mary's song of praise, the Magnificat, in Luke 1:49.

=== Judaism ===
- Verse 4-5 are found in the repetition of the Amidah during Rosh Hashanah.
- Verse 10 is recited upon awakening following Modeh Ani and handwashing.

=== Coptic Orthodox Church ===
In the Agpeya, the Coptic Church's book of hours, this psalm is prayed in the office of None.

=== Book of Common Prayer ===
In the Church of England's Book of Common Prayer, this psalm is appointed to be read on the morning of the twenty-third day of the month, as well as at Mattins on Easter Day.

== Musical settings ==
Heinrich Schütz wrote a setting of Psalm 111 in German, "Ich danke dem Herrn", SWV 34, as part of Psalmen Davids, published first in 1619. He wrote a setting of a metred paraphrase of the psalm in German, "Ich will von Herzen danken Gott dem Herren", SWV 209, for the Becker Psalter, published first in 1628. Marc-Antoine Charpentier composed four settings of the psalm in Latin:

- In 1670s, grand motet "Confitebor tibi Domine", H.151, for soloists, chorus, 2 violins, and continuo
- In 1690s, grand motet "Confitebor tibi Domine", H.200 - H.200 a, for soloists, chorus, and continuo
- In 1690s, grand motet "Confitebor tibi Domine", H.220, for soloists, chorus and continuo
- Mid - 1690s, grand motet "Confitebor tibi Domine", H.225, for soloists, chorus, flutes, strings and continuo

Henri Desmarets set one grand motet lorrain of it, "Confitebor tibi Domine" in 1707. Giovanni Battista Pergolesi composed a setting, Confitebor tibi Domine in C major for soprano, alto, choir, strings and continuo 1732.

== Text ==
The following table shows the Hebrew text of the Psalm with vowels, alongside the Koine Greek text in the Septuagint and the English translation from the King James Version. Note that the meaning can slightly differ between these versions, as the Septuagint and the Masoretic Text come from different textual traditions. (Note: A 1917 translation directly from Hebrew to English by the Jewish Publication Society can be found here or here, and an 1844 translation directly from the Septuagint by L. C. L. Brenton can be found here. Both translations are in the public domain.) In the Septuagint, this psalm is numbered Psalm 110.

#	Hebrew	English	Greek
1	הַ֥לְלוּ־יָ֨הּ ׀ אוֹדֶ֣ה יְ֭הֹוָה בְּכׇל־לֵבָ֑ב בְּס֖וֹד יְשָׁרִ֣ים וְעֵדָֽה׃	Praise ye the LORD. I will praise the LORD with my whole heart, in the assembly of the upright, and in the congregation.	᾿Αλληλούϊα. - ΕΞΟΜΟΛΟΓΗΣΟΜΑΙ σοι, Κύριε, ἐν ὅλῃ καρδίᾳ μου ἐν βουλῇ εὐθέων καὶ συναγωγῇ.
2	גְּ֭דֹלִים מַעֲשֵׂ֣י יְהֹוָ֑ה דְּ֝רוּשִׁ֗ים לְכׇל־חֶפְצֵיהֶֽם׃	The works of the LORD are great, sought out of all them that have pleasure therein.	μεγάλα τὰ ἔργα Κυρίου, ἐξεζητημένα εἰς πάντα τὰ θελήματα αὐτοῦ·
3	הוֹד־וְהָדָ֥ר פׇּעֳל֑וֹ וְ֝צִדְקָת֗וֹ עֹמֶ֥דֶת לָעַֽד׃	His work is honourable and glorious: and his righteousness endureth for ever.	ἐξομολόγησις καὶ μεγαλοπρέπεια τὸ ἔργον αὐτοῦ, καὶ ἡ δικαιοσύνη αὐτοῦ μένει εἰς τὸν αἰῶνα τοῦ αἰῶνος.
4	זֵ֣כֶר עָ֭שָׂה לְנִפְלְאוֹתָ֑יו חַנּ֖וּן וְרַח֣וּם יְהֹוָֽה׃	He hath made his wonderful works to be remembered: the LORD is gracious and full of compassion.	μνείαν ἐποιήσατο τῶν θαυμασίων αὐτοῦ, ἐλεήμων καὶ οἰκτίρμων ὁ Κύριος·
5	טֶ֭רֶף נָתַ֣ן לִירֵאָ֑יו יִזְכֹּ֖ר לְעוֹלָ֣ם בְּרִיתֽוֹ׃	He hath given meat unto them that fear him: he will ever be mindful of his covenant.	τροφὴν ἔδωκε τοῖς φοβουμένοις αὐτόν, μνησθήσεται εἰς τὸν αἰῶνα διαθήκης αὐτοῦ.
6	כֹּ֣חַ מַ֭עֲשָׂיו הִגִּ֣יד לְעַמּ֑וֹ לָתֵ֥ת לָ֝הֶ֗ם נַחֲלַ֥ת גּוֹיִֽם׃	He hath shewed his people the power of his works, that he may give them the heritage of the heathen.	ἰσχὺν ἔργων αὐτοῦ ἀνήγγειλε τῷ λαῷ αὐτοῦ τοῦ δοῦναι αὐτοῖς κληρονομίαν ἐθνῶν.
7	מַעֲשֵׂ֣י יָ֭דָיו אֱמֶ֣ת וּמִשְׁפָּ֑ט נֶ֝אֱמָנִ֗ים כׇּל־פִּקּוּדָֽיו׃	The works of his hands are verity and judgment; all his commandments are sure.	ἔργα χειρῶν αὐτοῦ ἀλήθεια καὶ κρίσις· πισταὶ πᾶσαι αἱ ἐντολαὶ αὐτοῦ,
8	סְמוּכִ֣ים לָעַ֣ד לְעוֹלָ֑ם עֲ֝שׂוּיִ֗ם בֶּאֱמֶ֥ת וְיָשָֽׁר׃	They stand fast for ever and ever, and are done in truth and uprightness.	ἐστηριγμέναι εἰς τὸν αἰῶνα τοῦ αἰῶνος, πεποιημέναι ἐν ἀληθείᾳ καὶ εὐθύτητι.
9	פְּד֤וּת ׀ שָׁ֘לַ֤ח לְעַמּ֗וֹ צִוָּֽה־לְעוֹלָ֥ם בְּרִית֑וֹ קָד֖וֹשׁ וְנוֹרָ֣א שְׁמֽוֹ׃	He sent redemption unto his people: he hath commanded his covenant for ever: holy and reverend is his name.	λύτρωσιν ἀπέστειλε τῷ λαῷ αὐτοῦ, ἐνετείλατο εἰς τὸν αἰῶνα διαθήκην αὐτοῦ· ἅγιον καὶ φοβερὸν τὸ ὄνομα αὐτοῦ.
10	רֵ֘אשִׁ֤ית חׇכְמָ֨ה ׀ יִרְאַ֬ת יְהֹוָ֗ה שֵׂ֣כֶל ט֭וֹב לְכׇל־עֹֽשֵׂיהֶ֑ם תְּ֝הִלָּת֗וֹ עֹמֶ֥דֶת לָעַֽד׃	The fear of the LORD is the beginning of wisdom: a good understanding have all they that do his commandments: his praise endureth for ever.	ἀρχὴ σοφίας φόβος Κυρίου, σύνεσις δὲ ἀγαθὴ πᾶσι τοῖς ποιοῦσιν αὐτήν. ἡ αἴνεσις αὐτοῦ μένει εἰς τὸν αἰῶνα τοῦ αἰῶνος.
