= Galatians 3 =

- ← chapter 2 chapter 4 →
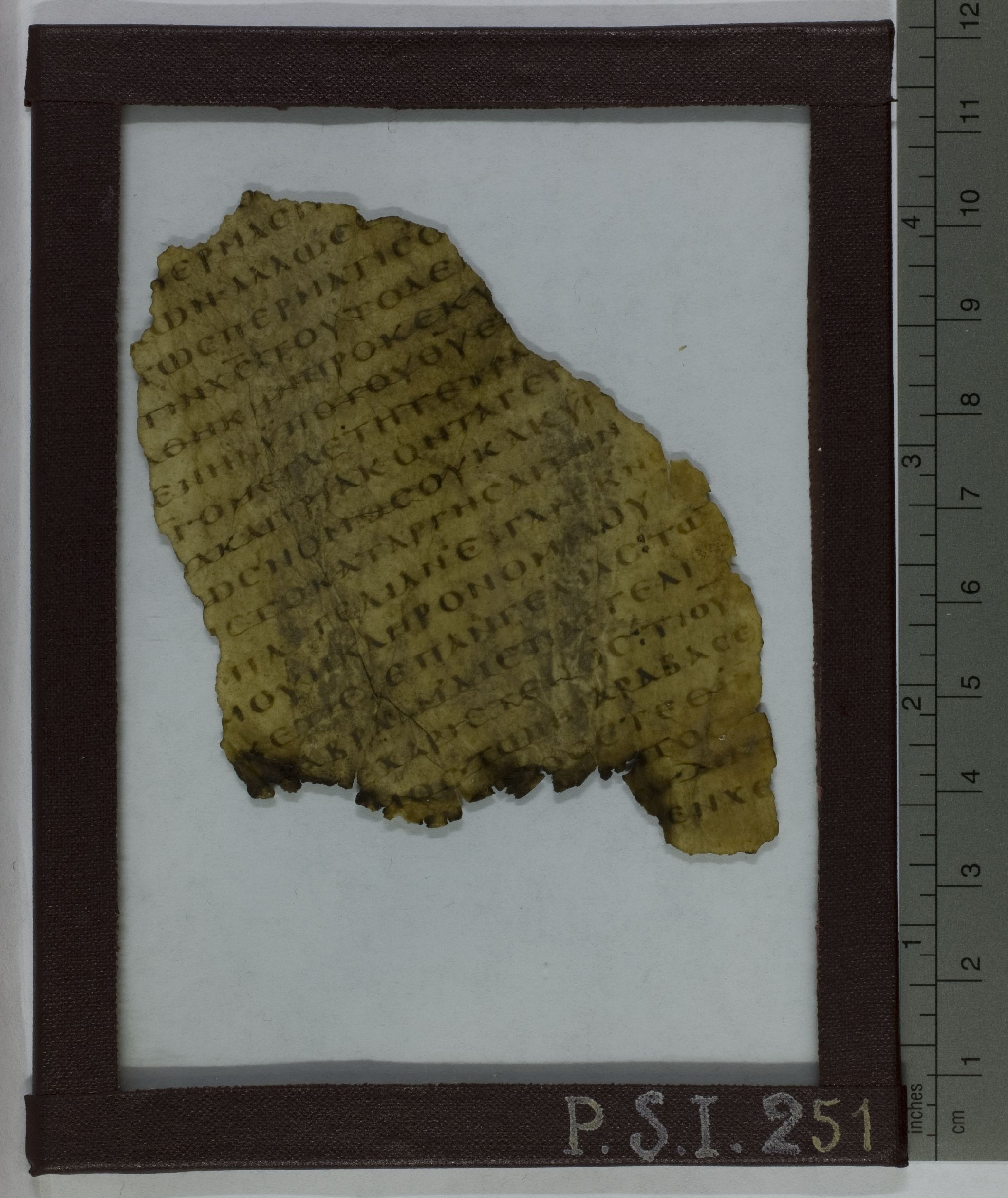
- A parchment leaf showing Galatians 3:16-25 on Uncial 0176, 4th/5th century.
- Book: Epistle to the Galatians
- Category: Pauline epistles
- Christian Bible part: New Testament
- Order in the Christian part: 9

Galatians 3 is the third chapter of the Epistle to the Galatians in the New Testament of the Christian Bible. It is authored by Paul the Apostle for the churches in Galatia, written between 49–58 AD. This chapter contains Paul's important argument about Abraham's faith and his 'offspring', a designation for "those belong to Jesus Christ".

== Text ==
The original text was written in Koine Greek. This chapter is divided into 29 verses.

=== Textual witnesses ===
Some early manuscripts containing the text of this chapter are:

- Papyrus 46 (~AD 200)
- Codex Vaticanus (325-350)
- Codex Sinaiticus (330-360)
- Uncial 0176 (4th/5th century; extant verses 16-25)
- Papyrus 99 (~400)
- Codex Alexandrinus (400-440)
- Codex Ephraemi Rescriptus (~450; complete)
- Codex Freerianus (~450; extant verses 6-8, 16-17, 24-28)
- Codex Claromontanus (~550)

=== Old Testament references ===
- Galatians 3:6: Genesis 15:6
- Galatians 3:8: Genesis 12:3; 18:18; 22:18; 26:4; 28:14
- Galatians 3:10: Deuteronomy 27:26; Jeremiah 11:3
- Galatians 3:11: Habakkuk 2:4
- Galatians 3:12: Leviticus 18:5
- Galatians 3:13: Deuteronomy 21:23
- Galatians 3:16: Genesis 12:7; 13:15; 24:7

== How to receive the Spirit (3:1–5) ==
Paul questions whether the Galatians received the Spirit by "works of the law" or by "believing what is heard", because receiving the Spirit is "the basis of their Christian experience" and should be continued in Spirit, not "with the flesh", meaning not on "the basis of carrying out the requirements of the law".

== Abraham Believed God (3:6–14) ==
Abraham is introduced in this part as his story is well-known to the people. The focus is on "Abraham's faith in God as the basis of his standing before God". The text of verse 3:6 is similar to Romans 4:3, and cites Genesis 15:6. Verse 3:10 cites Deuteronomy 27:26.

=== Verse 11 ===
But that no one is justified by the law in the sight of God is evident, for “the just shall live by faith.”

Citation from: Habakkuk 2:4

- "But that no one is justified by the law in the sight of God is evident"

The Pulpit Commentary paraphrases as "but that in the Law no man is justified with God, is evident," that "be justified" means to be brought out of a state of guiltiness and cursedness into a state of acceptance. This commentary asserts that Paul, assuming every one guilty and under a curse, now shows that the Law offers no means of justification, and thus by "adducing that cardinal aphorism of Habakkuk" substantiates the doctrine of justification by faith (also cited in Romans 1:17; Hebrews 10:38). When in Acts 13:39–41 it is read that in the synagogue at the Pisidian Antioch, in close connection with the statement that through believing in Christ a man is justified, Paul cited another passage of Habakkuk (Habakkuk 1:5), denouncing unbelieving despisers, indicating to the Pulpit Commentary that he had made good his statement about justification by alleging this same probative text.

- "By the law" or "in the law" (Greek: ἐν νόμῳ, en nomō)

The "law" is defined in the Pulpit Commentary as "being it", "the sphere and domain of the Law", comparing the use of the same preposition with Romans 2:12 ("As many as have sinned under [Greek, 'in'] the Law;") Romans 3:19 ("It saith to them that are under [Greek, 'in'] the Law."), whereas an exactly parallel construction is found in Acts 13:39 ("From all things from which ye could not by [Greek, 'in'] the Law be justified.").

- "Is justified with God" (Greek: δικαιοῦται παρὰ τῷ θεῷ, dikaioutai para tō Theō)

Noted in the Pulpit Commentary that the preposition "with" (παρά, para) is used similarly in Romans 2:13 ("For not the hearers of the Law are righteous with God"); 1 Corinthians 3:19 ("The wisdom of this world is foolishness with God"), so it is God himself that justifies the sinner (Romans 3:30; Romans 4:5).

- "The just shall live by faith" (Greek: ὁ δίκαιος ἐκ πίστεως ζήσεται, ho dikaios ek pisteōs zēsetai): A paraphrase based on direct translation from Greek in the Pulpit Commentary: "the righteous by faith shall live". It is noted in the Pulpit Commentary that the text doesn't use the usual phrase "as Scripture saith", like in the next verse out of Leviticus; which is also the case in Romans 9:7, but in Romans 15:3 and 1 Corinthians 2:9 Paul inserts, "according as it is written," in parentheses, before proceeding with the words of Scripture in such a way as to form a continuation of his own sentence. The same commentary claims to be generally agreed upon by Hebrew scholars that in the original passage (Habakkuk 2:4) the words, "by his faith" (or possibly, adopting another reading of the Hebrew text, "by my faith," that is, by faith in me) belong to "shall live," rather than to "the righteous" (see on this point Delitzsch on Hebrews 10:38, and Canon Cook on Habakkuk 2:4, in 'Speaker's Commentary'). The "faith" spoken of is shown by the context in Habakkuk to mean such reliance upon God as is of a steadfast character, and not a mere fleeting or occasional acceptance of God's promises as true, as the Pulpit Commentary points that this is plainly the view of the passage which is taken by the Pauline writer of the Hebrews in Hebrews 10:38.

=== Verse 13 ===
Christ has redeemed us from the curse of the law, having become a curse for us (for it is written, “Cursed is everyone who hangs on a tree”),

- "Christ has redeemed us from the curse of the law": Following Gill, the "Redeemer" is Jesus Christ, the Son of God, who was called and appointed to do this work by his Father, with full agreement fulfilling the prophecy under this character, qualified as man, as a "near kinsman", who has the right to redeem a person, and at the same time, as God, to accomplish it. Christ redeems "us", who are God's elect ("both Jews and Gentiles"). Gill wrote that Christ owns 'us' by the Father's gift, and now he purchases 'us' with the price of his own blood, delivering 'us' "from the curse of the law" and "from wrath to come", which is the second death."
- "Made a curse for us": Gill put this in the sense that Christ was made "an accursed person", despised by people of his generation, calling him a sinner, even called a "Samaritan", and "devil"; "even accursed by the law", while he was placed under the law, stood in the people's legal place and take the burden of their sins according to the law, which charges him with the sins, and curses him for their sake; and lastly also was accursed by the justice of God, his Father, who doesn't spare him, placing justice against him, punishing him up to death, that is the accursed death of the cross. It seems then that "he was made a curse", where "made" here is "by the will, counsel, and determination of God", and also his own will and free consent, as Jesus "freely laid down his life, and gave himself, and made his soul an offering for sin".
- "Cursed is everyone who hangs on a tree": Citation from Deuteronomy 21:23

== Abraham's Offspring (3:15–29) ==
In this part, Paul states that the interpretation of the promises in Genesis 17:8 is not for Abraham's "descendants" (plural), but for his "offspring" (singular; "seed" in Greek), referring to one person, Christ. The true "children of Abraham" are thus "those who are in Christ Jesus".

=== Verse 16 ===
Now to Abraham and his Seed were the promises made. He does not say, “And to seeds,” as of many, but as of one, “And to your Seed,” who is Christ.

Paul cited from the Old Testament, Genesis 12:7; 13:15; 24:7. In Genesis 22:18 the promise to Abraham says, "In your offspring all the nations of the earth will be blessed."

=== Verse 28 ===
Galatians 3:28 is frequently cited passage, with commenters finding relevance to gender equality, racism, queer theology, slavery, and egalitarianism. The New International Version's English translation reads:

There is neither Jew nor Gentile, neither slave nor free, nor is there male and female, for you are all one in Christ Jesus.

== Bibliography ==
- Bruce, F. F. (1982). The Epistle to the Galatians. The New International Greek Testament Commentary (reprint ed.). Wm. B. Eerdmans Publishing. ISBN 9780802823878.
- Stanton, G. N. (2007). "67. Galatians". In Barton, John; Muddiman, John (eds.). The Oxford Bible Commentary (first (paperback) ed.). Oxford University Press. pp. 1152–1165. ISBN 978-0199277186.
