= Promised Land =

Land given by God to Abraham's descendants in the Bible

In Abrahamic religions, the "Promised Land" is an area in the Levant, called Canaan, that God chose to bestow, via a series of covenants, upon the Israelites, descendants of Jacob (also known as "Israel'), the grandson of Abraham. Outside the Bible this tradition is mentioned in other ancient religious scriptures such as the Islamic Quran and classical historical records.

The Promised Land is translated as such in the following languages related to the topic:

- Hebrew: הָאָרֶץ הַמֻּבְטַחַת, romanized: Ha'aretz ha-Muvtaḥat
- Arabic: أرض الميعاد, romanized: 'Ard Almiead
- Biblical Greek: γῆ τῆς ἐπαγγελίας, romanized: gē tēs epangelias
- Phoenician: 𐤀𐤓𐤑 𐤌𐤁𐤕𐤇𐤕, romanized: 'Arṣ Mibtāḥat.

In the context of the Hebrew Bible, these descendants are originally understood to have been the Israelites, whose forefather was Jacob, who was a son of Abraham's son Isaac. The concept of the Promised Land largely overlaps with the Land of Israel (Zion) or the Holy Land in a biblical or religious sense and with Canaan or Palestine in a secular or geographic sense. Although the Book of Numbers provides some definition for the Promised Land's boundaries, they are not delineated with precision, but it is universally accepted that the core areas lie in and around Jerusalem. According to the biblical account, the Promised Land was not inherited until the Israelite conquest of Canaan, which took place shortly after the Exodus.

These promises were given to Abram, later called Abraham, before the birth of his sons. Abraham's family tree includes both the Ishmaelite tribes, the claimed ancestry of Arabs and of the Islamic prophet Muhammad, through Abraham's first son, Ishmael; and the Israelite tribes, claimed ancestors of Jews and Samaritans, descended through Abraham's second son, Isaac.

== Biblical narrative ==
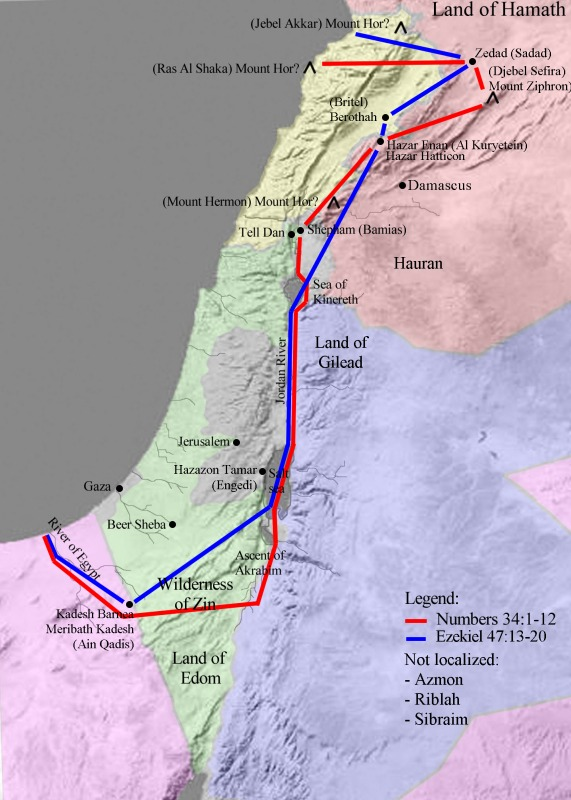
Estimated borders based on biblical interpretation of Numbers 34 and Ezekiel 47

The concept of the Promised Land is first mentioned in the Book of Genesis, which is the first book of the Torah, which collectively refers to the first five books of the Hebrew Bible. (Note: The Torah and the Hebrew Bible are both originally Jewish scriptures, but they are also regarded as holy in Christianity (which initially emerged as a Jewish religious movement) and Islam: Christians regard the Hebrew Bible as the Old Testament, while Muslims refer to the Torah by the Arabic name Tawrat.)

=== God's covenant with Abraham ===
God is believed in the Abrahamic religions to have made the following promises to Abraham which are recorded in several verses of Genesis:

The LORD had said to Abram, "Leave your country, your people and your father's household and go to the land I will show you." – Genesis 12:1: New International Version (NIV)
The LORD appeared to Abram and said, "To your offspring [or seed] I will give this land." – Genesis 12:7: NIV

God repeated the promise in Genesis 13:14-17:

The LORD said to Abram, after Lot had separated from him, "Lift up your eyes and look from the place where you are, northward and southward and eastward and westward, for all the land that you see I will give to you and to your offspring forever. I will make your offspring as the dust of the earth, so that if one can count the dust of the earth, your offspring also can be counted. Arise, walk through the length and the breadth of the land, for I will give it to you." – Genesis 13:14–17: English Standard Version

Later in a passage called the covenant of the pieces, Genesis 15:18-21 sets out an account of God's gift to Abram, a "huge amount of land", defined by its borders (Gevulot Ha-aretz):

On that day the Lord made a covenant with Abram and said, "To your descendants I give this land, from the Wadi of Egypt to the great river, the Euphrates – the land of the Kenites, Kenizzites, Kadmonites, Hittites, Perizzites, Rephaites, Amorites, Canaanites, Girgashites and Jebusites." – Genesis 15:18–21: NIV

These promises, attributed to God, were given prior to the birth of Abraham's sons. God's further promise was given when Abraham was 99 years of age, after his first son Ishmael had been born:

"I will give to you and to your offspring after you the land of your sojournings, all the land of Canaan, for an everlasting possession, and I will be their God." – Genesis 17:8: ESV

=== Subsequent confirmations ===
God later confirms the promise to Abraham's son Isaac (Genesis 26:3), and then to Isaac's son Jacob (Genesis 28:13) in terms of "the land on which you are lying". Jacob is later renamed "Israel" (Genesis 32:28) and his descendants are called the Children of Israel or the Twelve Tribes of Israel.

The Torah's subsequent Book of Exodus describes it as "land flowing with milk and honey" (Exodus 3:17) and gives verses on how to treat the prior occupants and marks the borders in terms of the Red Sea, the "Sea of the Philistines", and the "River", which a modern English Bible translates to:

"I will establish your borders from the Red Sea to the Mediterranean Sea, and from the desert to the Euphrates River. I will give into your hands the people who live in the land, and you will drive them out before you. Do not make a covenant with them or with their gods. Do not let them live in your land or they will cause you to sin against me, because the worship of their gods will certainly be a snare to you." – Exodus 23:31–33

The Israelites lived in a smaller area of former Canaanite land and land east of the Jordan River after the legendary prophet Moses led the Israelite Exodus out of Egypt (Numbers 34:1–12). The Torah's Book of Deuteronomy presents this occupation as their God's fulfillment of the promise (Deuteronomy 1:8). Moses anticipated that their God might subsequently give the Israelites land reflecting the boundaries of the original promise – if they were obedient to the covenant (Deuteronomy 19:8–9).

=== Boundaries from the Book of Numbers ===
The boundaries of the "Promised Land" given in the Book of Numbers, (chapter 34) are:

The South border: (v. 3) "Then your south quarter shall be from the wilderness of Zin along by the coast of Edom, and your south border shall be the outmost coast of the salt sea eastward : (v. 4) And your border shall turn from the south to the ascent of Akrabbim, and pass on to Zin : and the going forth thereof shall be from the south to Kadesh-barnea, and shall go on to Hazar-addar, and pass on to Azmon : (v. 5) And the border shall fetch a compass from Azmon unto the river of Egypt, and the goings out of it shall be at the sea."
The Western border: (v. 6) "And as for the western border, ye shall even have the great sea for a border: this shall be your west border."
The North border: (v. 7) "And this shall be your north border : from the great sea ye shall point out for you mount Hor : (v. 8) From mount Hor ye shall point out your border unto the entrance of Hamath; and the goings forth of the border shall be to Zedad : (v 9) And the border shall go on to Ziphron, and the goings out of it shall be at Hazar-enan : this shall be your north border."
The East border: (v. 10) "And ye shall point out your east border from Hazar-enan to Shepham: (v.11) And the coast shall go down from Shepham to Riblah, on the east side of Ain; and the border shall descend, and shall reach unto the side of the sea of Chinnereth eastward: (v. 12) And the border shall go down to Jordan, and the goings out of it shall be at the salt sea : this shall be your land with the coasts thereof round about."

== Interpretations ==
=== Jewish interpretation ===
The concept of the Promised Land is a central religious belief of the Jewish people.

Mainstream Jewish tradition regards the promise made to Abraham, Isaac and Jacob as applying to anyone a member of the Jewish people, including proselytes and in turn their descendants and is signified through the brit milah (rite of circumcision).

Genesis 15:18 records God's covenant with Abraham, which includes the borders of the Promised Land:

בַּיּוֹם הַהוּא כָּרַת ה' אֶת אַבְרָם בְּרִית לֵאמֹר: לְזַרְעֲךָ נָתַתִּי אֶת הָאָרֶץ הַזֹּאת מִנְּהַר מִצְרַיִם עַד הַנָּהָר הַגָּדֹל נְהַר פְּרָת.

In English:

On that day God made a covenant with Abraham: To your offspring I assign this land, from the river of Egypt to the great river, the river Euphrates

— The Contemporary Torah

Book of Joshua 1:4 records the first prophecy given to Joshua about the conquest of the land:

מֵהַמִּדְבָּר֩ וְהַלְּבָנ֨וֹן הַזֶּ֜ה וְֽעַד־הַנָּהָ֧ר הַגָּד֣וֹל נְהַר־פְּרָ֗ת כֹּ֚ל אֶ֣רֶץ הַֽחִתִּ֔ים וְעַד־הַיָּ֥ם הַגָּד֖וֹל מְב֣וֹא הַשָּׁ֑מֶשׁ יִֽהְיֶ֖ה גְּבוּלְכֶֽם

In English:

Your territory will extend from the desert to Lebanon, and from the great river, the Euphrates—all the Hittite country—to the Mediterranean Sea in the west.

— THE JPS TANAKH

=== Christian interpretation ===
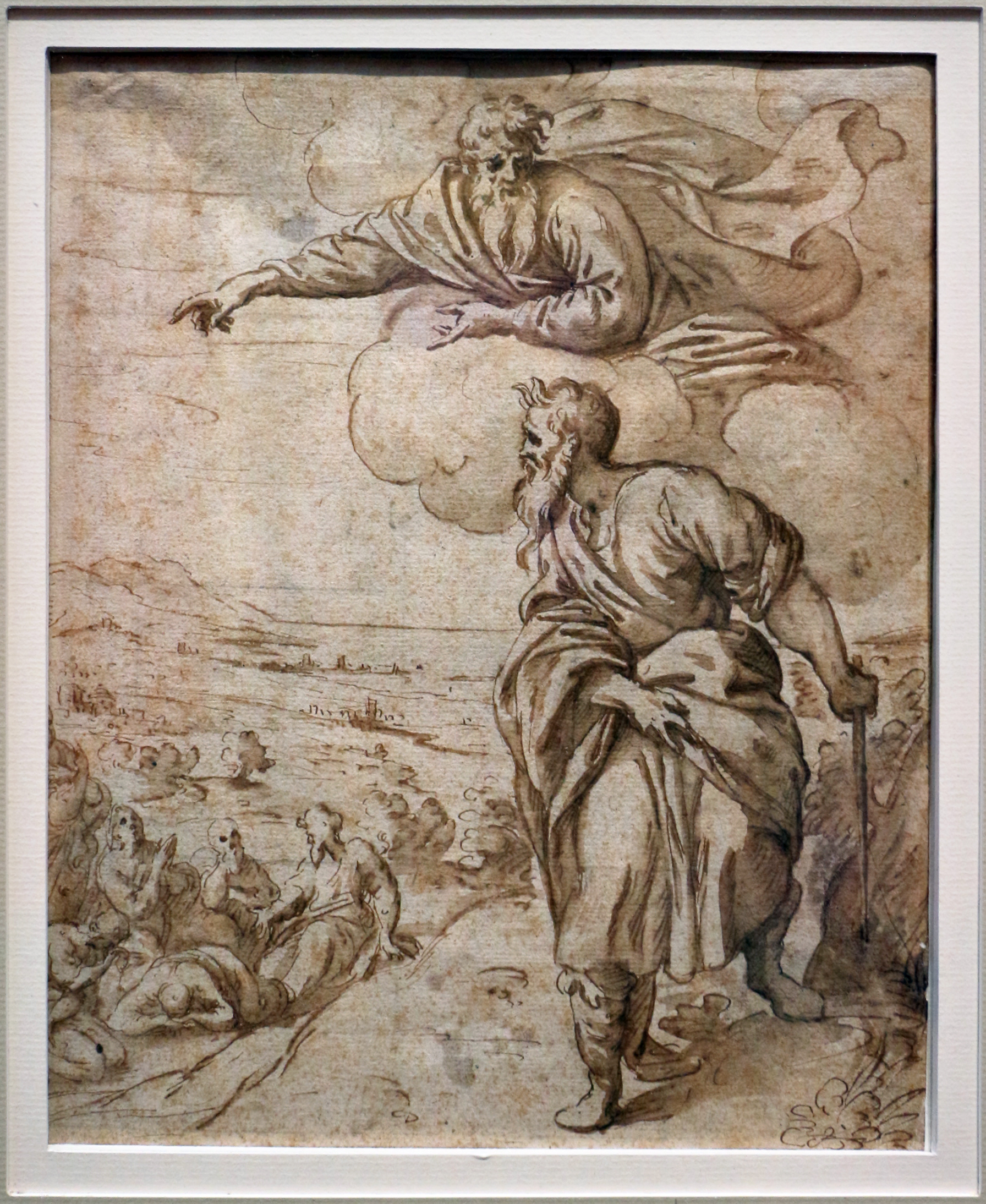
Imagined painting by Frans Pourbus the Elder (c. 1565–1580) depicting the Israelite's God showing Moses the Promised Land

==== New Testament ====
In the New Testament, the descent and promise is reinterpreted along religious lines. In the Epistle to the Galatians, Paul the Apostle draws attention to the formulation of the promise, avoiding the term "seeds" in the plural (meaning many people), choosing instead "seed," meaning one person, who he understands to be Jesus (and those united with him). For example, in Galatians 3:16 he notes:

"The promises were spoken to Abraham and to his seed. Scripture does not say "and to seeds", meaning many people, but "and to your seed", meaning one person, who is Christ."

In Galatians 3:28–29 Paul goes further, noting that the expansion of the promise from singular to the plural is not based on genetic/physical association, but a spiritual/religious one:

"There is neither Jew nor Gentile, neither slave nor free, neither male nor female, for you are all one in Christ Jesus. If you belong to Christ, then you are Abraham's seed, and heirs according to the promise."

In Romans 4:13 it is written:

"It was not through the law that Abraham and his offspring received the promise that he would be heir of the world, but through the righteousness that comes by faith."

German Lutheran Old Testament commentator Johann Friedrich Karl Keil states that the covenant is through Isaac, but notes that Ishmael's descendants have held much of that land through time.

==== Jerome ====
The boundaries of the 'Promised Land' given by Jerome around 400 CE read:

You may delineate the Promised Land of Moses from the Book of Numbers (ch. 34): as bounded on the south by the desert tract called Sina, between the Dead Sea and the city of Kadesh-barnea, [which is located with the Arabah to the east] and continues to the west, as far as the river of Egypt, that discharges into the open sea near the city of Rhinocolara; as bounded on the west by the sea along the coasts of Palestine, Phoenicia, Coele-Syria, and Cilicia; as bounded on the north by the circle formed by the Taurus Mountains and Zephyrium and extending to Hamath, called Epiphany-Syria; as bounded on the east by the city of Antioch Hippos and Lake Kinneret, now called Tiberias, and then the Jordan River which discharges into the salt sea, now called the Dead Sea.

==== Later theologians ====
Keil and Delitzsch, in the 19th century, note that Abraham had taken the western lands of Canaan after Lot, his nephew, had chosen to occupy the Jordan Valley in Genesis 13:11-12, but Lot in fact "had no share in the promise of God", and the words "northward and southward and eastward and westward ... all the land that you see" in Genesis 13:14-15 indicate that Abraham was promised the "whole extent" of the land.

=== Muslim interpretation ===
Jewish and Muslim tradition, with records that date to at least as far back as the works of 1st-century Jewish historian Flavius Josephus, postulates that Abraham's first son, Ishmael, was the founder of the Arab race. Islam's main prophet, Muhammad, also considered himself a Hanif, that is, a true monotheistic believer of the religion of Abraham. His tribe, the Quraysh, traces its ancestry to Ishmael. However, this cannot be proven as there are 30 missing ancestors from the lineage. For these reasons, Muslims in general understand that Arabs are also entitled to the “Promised Land” bestowed upon their common ancestor Abraham (“Ibrahim”).

=== Later uses ===
==== North America ====
Many European settlers who came to North America saw it as the "Promised Land", representing a haven from religious conflicts and persecution. For instance, the Puritan minister John Cotton's 1630 farewell sermon God's Promise to His Plantation to settlers preparing to depart Southampton for the Massachusetts Bay Colony included repeated references to the Exodus story, and later generations of German immigrants to the United States sang: "America [...] is a beautiful land that God promised to Abraham."

In a 1783 sermon celebrating American independence, the president of Yale University Ezra Stiles implied that Americans were chosen and delivered from bondage to a Promised Land: "the Lord shall have made his American Israel 'high above all nations which he hath made'", reflecting language from Deuteronomy of the promise. The Shawnee and Lenape scholar Steven Newcomb argued in his 2008 book Pagans in the Promised Land: Decoding the Doctrine of Christian Discovery that the discovery doctrine was also the same claim of "the right to kill and plunder non-Christians" found in this covenant tradition, whereby "the Lord" in Deuteronomy told his chosen people how they were to "utterly destroy" the "many nations before thee" when "He" brought them into the land "He" had discovered and promised to "His" "Chosen People" to "possess", and that this "right" was woven into US law through the 1823 Johnson v. McIntosh Supreme Court ruling.

==== African-American spirituals ====
African-American spirituals invoke the imagery of the "Promised Land" as heaven or paradise and as an escape from slavery, which could often only be reached by death. The imagery and term also appear elsewhere in popular culture, in sermons, and in speeches such as Martin Luther King Jr.'s 1968 "I've Been to the Mountaintop", in which he said:

I just want to do God's will. And He's allowed me to go up to the mountain. And I've looked over. And I've seen the Promised Land. I may not get there with you. But I want you to know tonight, that we, as a people, will get to the Promised Land. So I'm happy, tonight. I'm not worried about anything. I'm not fearing any man. Mine eyes have seen the glory of the coming of the Lord.

==== Palestinian nationalism ====
Some Palestinians claim partial descent from the Israelites and Maccabees, as well as from other peoples who have lived in the region.

- 1845: Salomon Munk, Palestine, Description Géographique, Historique et Archéologique," in "L'Univers Pittoresque:

Under the name Palestine, we comprehend the small country formerly inhabited by the Israelites, and which is today part of Acre and Damascus pachalics. It stretched between 31 and 33° N. latitude and between 32 and 35° degrees E. longitude, an area of about 1300 French: lieues carrées. Some zealous writers, to give the land of the Hebrews some political importance, have exaggerated the extent of Palestine; but we have an authority for us that one can not reject. St. Jerome, who had long traveled in this country, said in his letter to Dardanus (ep. 129) that the northern boundary to that of the southern, was a distance of 160 Roman miles, which is about 55 French: lieues. He paid homage to the truth despite his fears, as he said himself, of availing the Promised Land to pagan mockery, "Pudet dicere latitudinem terrae repromissionis, ne ethnicis occasionem blasphemandi dedisse uideamur" (Latin: "I am embarrassed to say the breadth of the promised land, lest we seem to have given the heathen an opportunity of blaspheming").

== See also ==
- Battle of Refidim
- Canaan
- Conquest of Canaan
- Covenant of the pieces
- Greater Israel
- Holy Land
- Israel
- Jews as the chosen people
- Land of Israel
- Palestine (region)
- Southern Levant
- Who is a Jew?
- Yom HaAliyah

== General sources ==
- Millar, Fergus (2011-05-01). Cotton, Hannah M.; Rogers, Guy M. (eds.). Rome, the Greek World, and the East: Volume 3: The Greek World, the Jews, and the East. The University of North Carolina Press. ISBN 978-0-8078-7665-7. OCLC 646793155.
