= Galatians 1 =

- ← 2 Corinthians 13 chapter 2 →
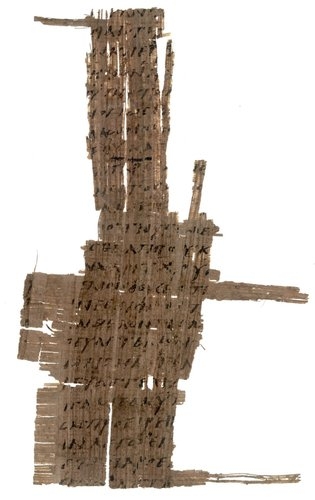
- A page showing Galatians 1:2–10 on Papyrus 51, c. 400.
- Book: Epistle to the Galatians
- Category: Pauline epistles
- Christian Bible part: New Testament
- Order in the Christian part: 9

Galatians 1 is the first chapter of the Epistle to the Galatians in the New Testament of the Christian Bible. Authorship is traditionally attributed to Paul the Apostle, writing for the churches in Galatia between 49 and 58 AD. This chapter contains Paul's exposition concerning the significance of what he says is God's revelation of Jesus Christ.

== Text ==
The original text was written in Koine Greek. This chapter is divided into 24 verses.

=== Textual witnesses ===
Some early manuscripts containing the text of this chapter are:

- Papyrus 46 (~AD 200)
- Codex Vaticanus (325–350)
- Codex Sinaiticus (330–360)
- Papyrus 51 (~400; extant verses 2–10, 13, 16–20)
- Papyrus 99 (~400; extant verses 4–11, 18–24)
- Codex Alexandrinus (400–440)
- Codex Ephraemi Rescriptus (~450; extant verses 21–24)
- Codex Freerianus (~450; extant verses 1–3, 11–13, 22–24)
- Codex Claromontanus (~550)

== Opening greetings (1:1–5) ==
The form of the opening words follows the custom in the era "writer to addresses; greetings" found in other New Testament and early Christian letters. Only Romans 1:1-6 elaborates the greetings at a greater length than in this epistle.

=== Verse 1 ===
Paul, an apostle (not from men nor through man, but through Jesus Christ and God the Father who raised Him from the dead),

- "Apostle": translated from Greek word ἀπόστολος, apostolos, which generally means 'one who is sent' (as in John 13:16), but in the New Testament is more specifically applied to those specially commissioned by Jesus Christ. Paul's striking comment on his apostleship ("not from men" etc.) emphasizes his ministry in Galatia under the commission by Jesus Christ and God the Father.

=== Verse 2 ===
and all the brethren who are with me,

To the churches of Galatia:

- "All the brethren" (NRSV: "all the members of God's family"): Unlike the other epistles that name individual co-workers (such as Sosthenes in 1 Corinthians 1:1, Timothy in 2 Corinthians 1:1), Paul alludes to 'God's family' consisting of men and women, using the word adelphoi, literally 'brothers' (or 'brethren'), which can also include 'sisters'.

== Rebuke (1:6–9) ==
Instead of expression of thanks given to God for the audience typically found after the greetings in genuine Pauline epistles, Paul criticizes the Galatians for deserting his teaching of God's grace, and calls those who spread what he considers a fake gospel as anathema.

== Proclamation of the Gospel (1:10–12) ==
Paul claims that his proclamation of the gospel is not of human origin but directly from the revelation of Jesus Christ.

== Paul's pre-Christian life and conversion (1:13–17) ==
The clarifying account of Paul's pre-Christian life may be a response to an effort by his opponents to use it to undermine his authority. The word 'Judaism' in verses 13 and 14 are the only two references in the whole New Testament, and not until half a century later in the writings of Ignatius, 'Judaism' and 'Christianity' are considered two 'religions'.

== Contacts at Jerusalem (1:18–24) ==
In this part, Paul recounts his interaction with the leaders in Jerusalem, but maintains his independence of the Jerusalem authorities.

=== Verse 18 ===
Then after three years I went up to Jerusalem to see Peter, and remained with him fifteen days.

- "After three years": This is after Paul's conversion, not after his return to Damascus. Paul wanted to join the church in Jerusalem, but the members doubted and avoided him, until Barnabas brought him to Simon Peter and James (the brother of Jesus), informing the conversion and his eagerness to preach the Gospel in Damascus.
- "Peter": Several Alexandrian and Ethiopia copies read "Cephas", which is another name of the same Simon Peter.

=== Verse 19 ===
But other of the apostles saw I none, save James the Lord's brother.

- "James the Lord's brother" refers to "James the brother of Jesus Christ", a distinguished member of the church in Jerusalem (Acts 12:17; 1 Corinthians 9:5). The Catholic tradition holds that this James is to be identified with James, son of Alphaeus, and James the Less. Although some argue that he is not one of the Twelve Apostles, but is named an apostle in the wider sense (cf. 1 Corinthians 15:7; 1 Corinthians 9:5); see the note in Galatians 1:1.

== Bibliography ==
- Bruce, F. F. (1982). The Epistle to the Galatians. The New International Greek Testament Commentary (reprint ed.). Wm. B. Eerdmans Publishing. ISBN 9780802823878.
- Stanton, G. N. (2007). "67. Galatians". In Barton, John; Muddiman, John (eds.). The Oxford Bible Commentary (first (paperback) ed.). Oxford University Press. pp. 1152–1165. ISBN 978-0199277186.
