= Galatians 2 =

- ← chapter 1 chapter 3 →
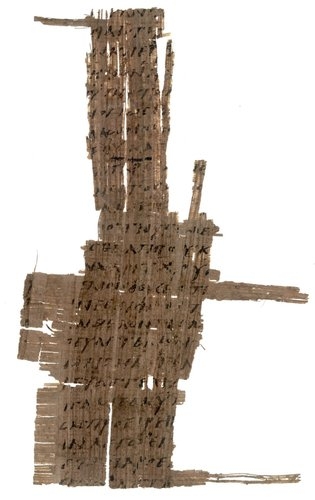
- A page showing Galatia 1:2-10 on Papyrus 51, ca. AD 400.
- Book: Epistle to the Galatians
- Category: Pauline epistles
- Christian Bible part: New Testament
- Order in the Christian part: 9

Galatians 2 is the second chapter of the Epistle to the Galatians in the New Testament of the Christian Bible. It is authored by Paul the Apostle for the churches in Galatia, written between 49 and 58 AD. This chapter contains the meeting account of Paul, Barnabas and Christians in Jerusalem, considered "one of the most momentous events in the earliest Christianity", and the dispute between Paul and Peter.

== Text ==
The original text was written in Koine Greek. This chapter is divided into 21 verses.

=== Textual witnesses ===
Some early manuscripts containing the text of this chapter are:

- Papyrus 46 (~AD 200)
- Codex Vaticanus (325-350)
- Codex Sinaiticus (330-360)
- Papyrus 99 (~400)
- Codex Alexandrinus (400-440)
- Codex Ephraemi Rescriptus (~450; complete)
- Codex Freerianus (~450; extant verses 1, 8–9, 16–17)
- Codex Claromontanus (~550)

== Conference in Jerusalem (2:1–10) ==
Scholars generally connect the meeting described in this part with the accounts in Acts 11:29–30 and/or Acts 15:1–29, although the details are unclear.

=== Verse 1 ===
Then after fourteen years I went up again to Jerusalem with Barnabas, and also took Titus with me.

- "After 14 years" most likely refers to "Paul's call" (Galatians 1:15–16), not to his visit to Cephas (Galatians 1:18–19).

=== Verse 9 ===
and when James, Cephas, and John, who seemed to be pillars, perceived the grace that had been given to me, they gave me and Barnabas the right hand of fellowship, that we should go to the Gentiles and they to the circumcised.

- "James, Cephas, and John": James was a brother of Jesus Christ, attributed to the Epistle of James, gave the famous speech in the synod at Jerusalem (Acts 15:13), presided in the church in Jerusalem, was a man of great holiness, and much esteemed by the followers of Jesus. Cephas is the name that was given by Christ to Simon Peter (John 1:42) and in the Syriac language signifies a "stone", as the word "Peter" does in the Greek, to which Jesus alludes, (Matthew 16:18). John was the evangelist, and the same that wrote the epistles, was the beloved disciple, and who outlived all the rest.
- "Who seemed to be pillars" (pillars: Greek στῦλοι, styloi): they were considered "the very chief of the apostles" (cf. Proverbs 9:1; Revelation 3:12).
- "The right hand of fellowship": a token of a covenant or agreement between them, taking them into partnership with them, admitted them as apostles into their society, and gave their full consent, to show their joint agreement, used the above rite; which was used among other nations, also among the Jews, when covenants were made, or partnership was entered into; see (Leviticus 6:2) where the phrase "in putting of the hand", both by Onkelos, and Jonathan ben Uzziel, is rendered "in fellowship of the hand", or "by the right hand of fellowship".
- "The circumcised": that is among the Jews.

== Incident at Antioch (2:11–14) ==
The disagreement between Paul and Peter recorded in this part is a contrast to their amicable meeting in Jerusalem. The absence of the outcome report indicates that this issue has influenced the tensions in the Galatians churches, which is addressed in this epistle.

=== Verse 11 ===
Now when Peter had come to Antioch, I withstood him to his face, because he was to be blamed;

This serves as a summary of the confrontation between Paul and Peter, which leads to the discussion of the main issue in 2:15–21.

== Works of Law or Faith? (2:15–21) ==
In this part, Paul details the theological reasons of his dispute with Peter. In verse 17 Paul uses the word 'we'/'our' to show that both he and Peter actually agreed about the justification by faith only, and based on this mutual conviction Paul confronted Peter when Peter became inconsistent.

=== Verse 16 ===
knowing that a man is not justified by the works of the law but by faith in Jesus Christ, even we have believed in Christ Jesus, that we might be justified by faith in Christ and not by the works of the law; for by the works of the law no flesh shall be justified.

- "Justified": "declared righteous".

=== Verse 20 ===
I have been crucified with Christ; it is no longer I who live, but Christ lives in me; and the life which I now live in the flesh I live by faith in the Son of God, who loved me and gave Himself for me.

In Paul's belief, a believer 'dies to the law' through the crucifixion and death of Christ, and has the new life that is "no longer self-centered, but Christ-centered", the resurrection life where the risen Christ lives in.

=== Verse 21 ===
I do not set aside the grace of God, for if righteousness comes through the law, then Christ died for nothing.

- "Set aside (NASB: "nullifying") the grace of God": that is "by receiving it and then going on as though it made no difference", either by "continuing to live under the law" or by "continuing to sin".

== See also ==
- Antioch
- Barnabas
- Council of Jerusalem
- James the Just
- Jerusalem
- Jesus Christ
- Judea
- Paul of Tarsus
- Simon Peter
- Titus
- Related Bible parts: Acts 11, Acts 15

== Bibliography ==
- Bruce, F. F. (1982). The Epistle to the Galatians. The New International Greek Testament Commentary (reprint ed.). Wm. B. Eerdmans Publishing. ISBN 9780802823878.
- Stanton, G. N. (2007). "67. Galatians". In Barton, John; Muddiman, John (eds.). The Oxford Bible Commentary (first (paperback) ed.). Oxford University Press. pp. 1152–1165. ISBN 978-0199277186.
