= Galatians 4 =

- ← chapter 3 chapter 5 →
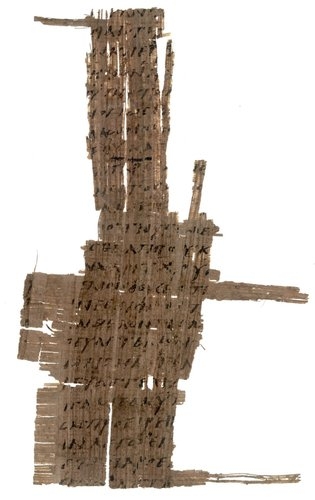
- A page showing Galatia 1:2-10 on Papyrus 51, ca. AD 400.
- Book: Epistle to the Galatians
- Category: Pauline epistles
- Christian Bible part: New Testament
- Order in the Christian part: 9

Galatians 4 is the fourth chapter of the Epistle to the Galatians in the New Testament of the Christian Bible. It is authored by Paul the Apostle for the churches in Galatia, written between 49 and 58 CE. This chapter contains one of Paul's richest statements in Christology.

== Text ==
The original text was written in Koine Greek. This chapter is divided into 31 verses.

=== Textual witnesses ===
Some early manuscripts containing the text of this chapter are:

- Papyrus 46 (~AD 200)
- Codex Vaticanus (325–50)
- Codex Sinaiticus (330–60)
- Papyrus 99 (~400)
- Codex Alexandrinus (400–40)
- Codex Ephraemi Rescriptus (~450; complete)
- Codex Freerianus (~450; extant verses 8–10, 20–23)
- Codex Claromontanus (~550)

=== Old Testament references ===
- Galatians 4:27
- Galatians 4:30: Genesis 21:10

== The Sending of the Son (4:1–7) ==
In this part, Paul uses the illustration that an heir is in a better position than a slave to inherit an estate one day. God sent Jesus as his heir to "redeem those under the law", so "all who are in Christ Jesus might receive adoption."

=== Verse 4 ===
But when the fullness of the time had come, God sent forth His Son, born of a woman, born under the law,

- "The fullness of the time": Paul believed and affirmed that the sending of Jesus Christ is at "the nodal point of salvation-history".
- "Born of a woman": According to Cornelius a Lapide, this "denotes conception without a male". It is Paul's only reference to Saint Mary.
- "Born under the law" means "born as a Jew."

=== Verse 5 ===
to redeem those who were under the law, that we might receive the adoption as sons.

- "To redeem those who were under the law": means "to redeem from the 'curse of the law"' (Galatians 3:13), which is achieved by Christ's death "on which a curse was pronounced".

=== Verse 6 ===
And because you are sons, God has sent forth the Spirit of His Son into your hearts, crying out, "Abba, Father!"

- "And because you are sons": Some copies have "...sons of God"; the Ethiopian version reads "inasmuch as ye are his sons". God set up Christ, his Son, as the pattern for these sons to conform, by virtue of his act of grace they were considered as the children of God through Christ when he "partook of their flesh and blood", and died to gather them together who were scattered (cf. Hebrews 2:13–14; John 11:52). The sons and daughters of the Lord God Almighty become the siblings of the Son of God, because through the redemption of Christ they receive the adoption as children, not as servants.
- "God has sent forth the Spirit of His Son into your hearts, crying out, "Abba, Father!"": The Syriac and Arabic versions read, "our Father". All the three divine persons: God and his Son and the Spirit of his Son appear here. The same Spirit of God that moved upon the face of the waters at the creation of the world, has moved holy men of God to write the Scriptures, formed and filled the human nature of Christ, and descended on him as a dove (see Baptism of Jesus), and by whom Christ and his apostles performed their miracles; it is called in Judaism "the Spirit of the King Messiah".

== Want to Be Enslaved Again? (4:8–11) ==
This part exposes Paul's fear that the Galatians, who before becoming Christians were enslaved to idols, now after being believers of Christ would want to be enslaved again, by meticulously observing the Jewish calendar rituals.

== Paul's Perplexity (4:12–20) ==
The verses 12–20 display Paul's "passionate concern" for the spiritual condition of the Galatians, whom he addressed as 'friends' or 'brethren' (verse 12) and 'my little children' (verse 19), and his wish to be personally present in their midst.

== The Hagar and Sarah Allegory (4:21–5:1) ==
This part is considered as "Paul's striking final argument" to contrast the children born of 'a slave woman' (Hagar), that is "to be subject to the law", with the children born of 'a free woman' (Sarah) 'through the promise' and 'according to the Spirit'; a contrast between "law" and "grace".

=== Verse 25 ===
for this Hagar is Mount Sinai in Arabia, and corresponds to Jerusalem which now is, and is in bondage with her children—

"Hagar is Mount Sinai in Arabia": NRSV gives the second rendering in its note, "For Sinai is a mountain in Arabia". By "Arabia", Paul likely meant the Nabataean Kingdom, which included the Sinai Peninsula. He states in Galatians 1:17 that he had been to Arabia, and in 2 Corinthians 11:32 he mentions its king, Aretas IV.

=== Verse 27 ===
For it is written:

"Rejoice, O barren,
You who do not bear!
Break forth and shout,
You who are not in labor!
For the desolate has many more children
Than she who has a husband."

Citation from Isaiah 54:1

== See also ==
- Isaac
- Jerusalem

== Sources ==
- Bruce, F. F. (1982). The Epistle to the Galatians. The New International Greek Testament Commentary (reprint ed.). Wm. B. Eerdmans. ISBN 978-0-80282387-8.
- Stanton, G. N. (2007). "67. Galatians". In Barton, John; Muddiman, John (eds.). The Oxford Bible Commentary (1st (paperback) ed.). Oxford University Press. pp. 1152–65. ISBN 978-0-19927718-6.
