= Uncial 0150 =

- New Testament manuscript
- Text: Pauline epistles †
- Date: 9th century
- Script: Greek
- Now at: Monastery of Saint John the Theologian
- Size: 26 cm by 17.5 cm
- Type: mixed
- Category: III

Uncial 0150 (in the Gregory-Aland numbering), X^{2} (in the Soden numbering), is a Greek uncial manuscript of the New Testament. It is dated paleographically to the 9th century.

== Description ==
The codex contains the Pauline epistles with some lacunae, on 150 parchment leaves (26 cm by 17.5 cm). The text is written in one column per page, 34 lines per page, in large uncial letters. It contains a commentary.

Epistle to the Hebrews placed between 2 Thessalonians and 1 Timothy.

The Greek text of this codex is mostly Byzantine with some Alexandrian readings. Aland placed it in Category III.

In Ephesians 4:16 it reads συνβιβαζομενον for συμβιβαζομενον; the reading is supported by Papyrus 46, Papyrus 99, Sinaiticus, Alexandrinus, Vaticanus, Ephraemi Rescriptus, Bezae, Augiensis, Boernerianus.

Gregory dated it to the 10th century. Currently it is dated by the INTF to the 9th century.

Formerly it was classified as minuscule 413^{p}. In 1908 Gregory gave number 150 to it.

The codex currently is located at the Monastery of Saint John the Theologian (Ms. 61), at Patmos.

== See also ==
- List of New Testament uncials
- Textual criticism
