= Slave Bible =

1807 Bible intended to be read by slaves

Title page of Slave Bible
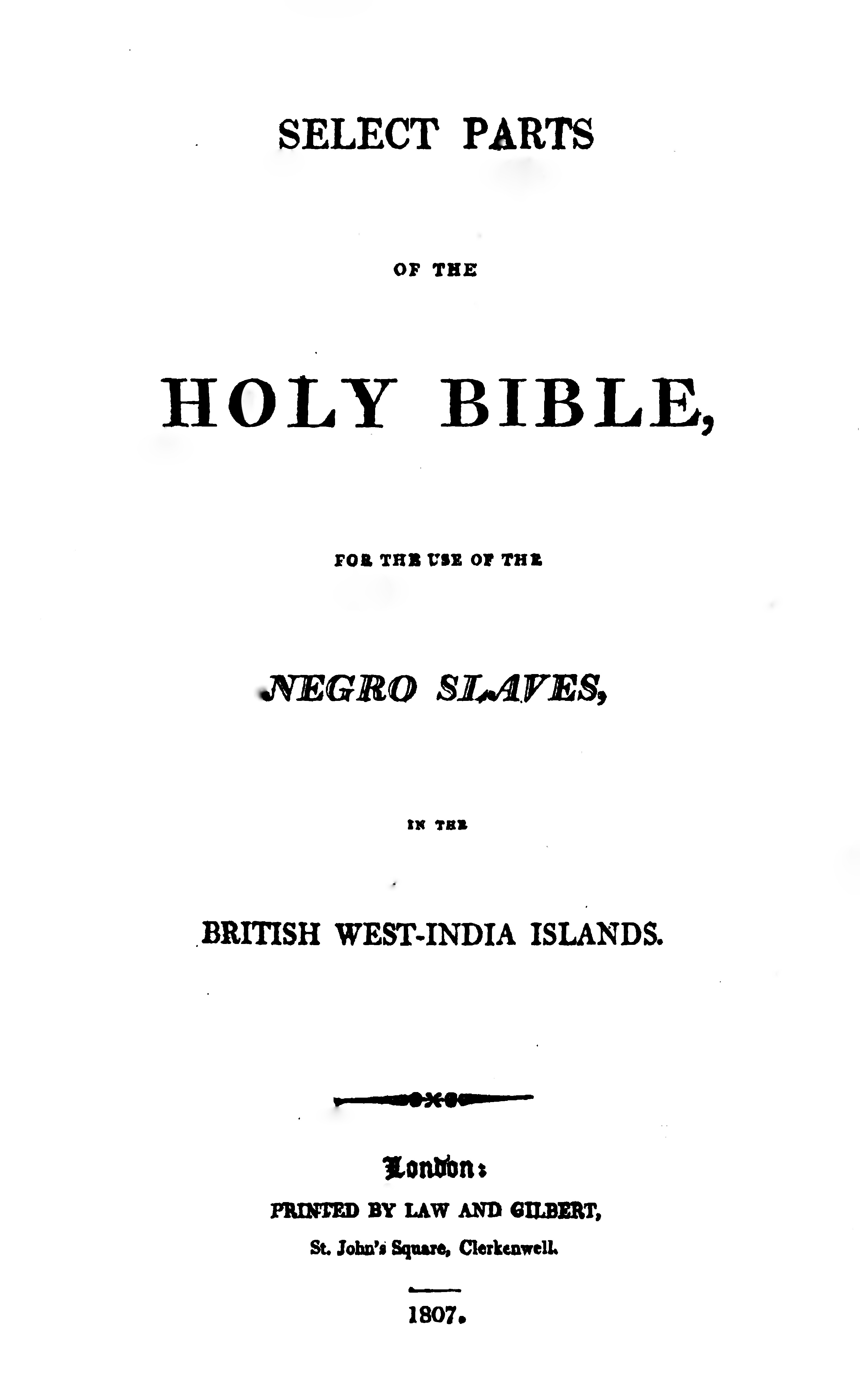
- The title page of the Bible censored as deemed suitable for slaves.
- Complete Bible published: 1807
- Derived from: King James Version (1611)
- Translation type: Formal equivalence
- Copyright: Public domain
- Genesis 1:1–3 The creation of heaven and earth. Of man in the image of god. The appointment of food. In the beginning God created the heaven and the earth. And the earth was without form, and void; and darkness was upon the face of the deep. And the Spirit of God moved upon the face of the waters. And God said, Let there be light: and there was light.

The Select Parts of the Holy Bible for the use of the Negro Slaves in the British West-India Islands, known in short as the Slave Bible, is a much-reduced version of the Bible with references to freedom removed and references to obedience to a master retained, made for teaching a pro-slavery version of Christianity to enslaved people in the British West Indies. Most of the Old Testament and half of the New Testament were removed.

== Background ==
The Slave Bible was produced in England in the early 19th century for use in the British West Indies. All "references to freedom and escape from slavery" were removed, while passages encouraging obedience and submission were emphasized. These references emphasizing loyalty and submission to the slave master were instructions handed down by Beilby Porteus (then Bishop of London), who stated: "prepare a short form of public prayer, together with select portions of scripture particularly those which relate of the slave duties toward the master."

British missionaries used it in the education and conversion of the enslaved population. The editors included only 10 percent of the Old Testament and half of the New Testament. For example, among the excluded passages are Galatians 3:28 which states: "There is neither Jew nor Greek, there is neither bond nor free, there is neither male nor female: for ye are all one in Christ Jesus". Exodus 21:16 and Deuteronomy 23:15–16 were also removed.

The publishers of the Slave Bible thought these sections, such as the Exodus, the Psalms, and the Book of Revelation, "could instill in slaves a dangerous hope for freedom and dreams of equality". Passages like Ephesians 6:5, "Servants, be obedient to them that are your masters according to the flesh, with fear and trembling, in singleness of your heart, as unto Christ", were retained. The Museum of the Bible, during a 2018 exhibition called "The Slave Bible: Let the Story Be Told", exhibited one of three copies extant of the Bible first published in 1807 by Law and Gilbert of London, printed for the Society for the Conversion of Negro Slaves and now owned by Fisk University.

== See also ==
- The Bible and slavery
- Christian views on slavery
