= Uncial 0122 =

- New Testament manuscript
- Text: Galatians †; Hebrews †
- Date: 9th-century
- Script: Greek
- Now at: Russian National Library
- Size: 25 cm by 20 cm
- Type: Byzantine text-type
- Category: III

Uncial 0122 (in the Gregory-Aland numbering), α 1030 (Soden), is a Greek uncial manuscript of the New Testament. Palaeographically it has been assigned to the 9th-century. Hort designated it by O^{d}.

== Description ==
The codex contains a small parts of the Galatians 5:12-6:4 and Hebrews 5:8-6:10 on two parchment leaves (25 cm by 20 cm). The text is written in two columns per page, 28 lines per page, in small uncial letters. It has breathings and accents. There are liturgical markings at the margin in red.

== Text ==
The Greek text of this codex is a representative of the Byzantine text-type, but with considerable deviations from the Byzantine text (Galatians 5:12.14.17.22.23.24; 6:1.3). Aland placed it in Category III. It means the text of the manuscript has a historical importance.

In Galatians 6:2 its read αναπληρωσατε along with א, A, C, D^{gr}, K, P, Ψ, 33, 81, 88, 104, 181, Byz.

It was heavily corrected.

== History ==
Currently it is dated by the INTF to the 9th-century.

The manuscript was examined and described by Constantin von Tischendorf, Eduard de Muralt and Kurt Treu.

The codex now is located in the Russian National Library (Gr. 32), in Saint Petersburg.

== See also ==
- List of New Testament uncials
- Textual criticism
