= Uncial 0176 =

- New Testament manuscript
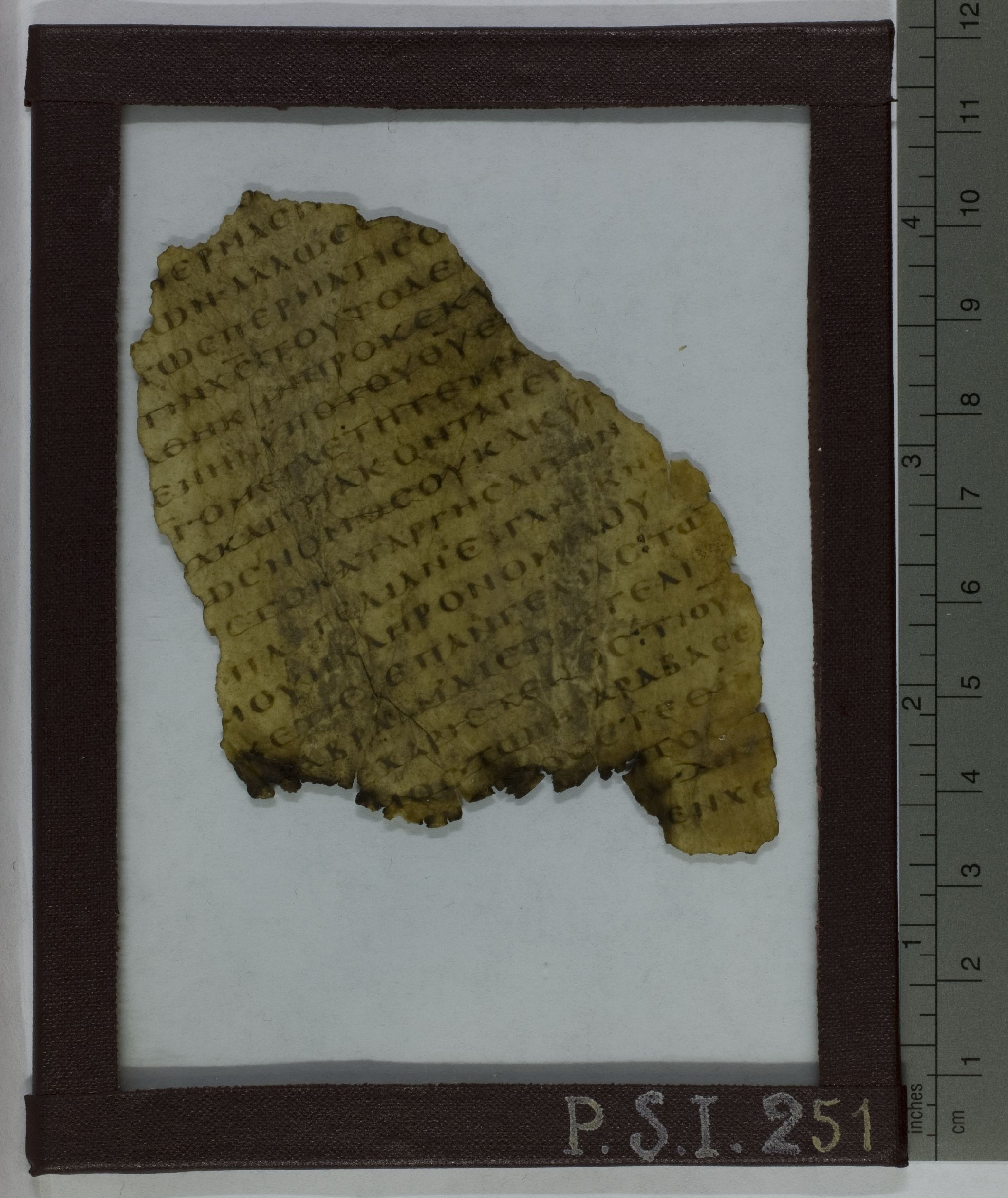
- Text: Galatians 3:16-25
- Date: 4th / 5th century
- Script: Greek
- Now at: Laurentian Library
- Size: 12 x 7 cm
- Type: Byzantine
- Category: III

Uncial 0176 (in the Gregory-Aland numbering), is a Greek uncial manuscript of the New Testament, dated paleographically to the 4th century (or 5th).

== Description ==
The codex contains a small part of the Epistle to the Galatians (3:16-25), on one parchment leaf (12 cm by 7 cm). It is written in one column per page, 22 lines per page, in a small uncial letters.

The Greek text of this codex is Byzantine, but Aland placed it in Category III.

Currently it is dated by the INTF to the 4th or 5th century. It was examined by Guglielmo Cavallo.

The codex currently is housed at the Laurentian Library (PSI 251) in Florence.

== Textual Variants ==
- 3:18a It reads επανγελιας rather than the usual reading επαγγελιας.
- 3:18b It reads κεχαριστε rather than the usual reading of κεχαρισται.
- 3:22 It reads συνεκλισεν rather than the usual reading of συνεκλεισεν.
- 3:23 It reads συνκεκλισμενοι rather than the usual reading of συγκεκλεισμενοι.

These minor spelling variations constitute the only deviations in 0176 from the common text of most manuscripts of Galatians.

== See also ==
- List of New Testament uncials
- Textual criticism
