= Galatians 3:28 =

Galatians 3:28 is the twenty-eighth verse of the third chapter in the Epistle to the Galatians in the New Testament of the Christian Bible. It is a widely commented-upon biblical passage among Paul's statements. It is sometimes cited in various Christian discussions about gender equality, abolitionism and antiracism.

== Content ==
In the Berean Study Bible the text reads:

There is neither Jew nor Greek, slave nor free, male nor female, for you are all one in Christ Jesus.

== Analysis ==
The verse literally translates to "There is neither Jew nor Greek, slave nor free, male nor female, for you are all one in Christ Jesus". David Scholer, New Testament scholar at Fuller Theological Seminary, believes that the passage is "the fundamental Pauline theological basis for the inclusion of women and men as equal and mutual partners in all of the ministries of the church." Another interpretation is that conventional translations are misleading, because the verse seems to say that all have the opportunity to become Christians, but not that social differences should be eradicated. It is also debated if the word literally translated "Greek" refers to Greeks or to all non-Jews; it is sometimes translated "gentile".

== Connection with other biblical passages ==
The conventional interpretation is that the passage is part of a baptismal invocation. However, there are other minority views, one of which connects the verse to the circumcision controversy in early Christianity. New Testament scholar Bernard C. Lategan argued that a pre-Pauline origin was unlikely due to the novel and unique character of the verse. There is also a theory which links the verse to Genesis 1:27, which states that man was created in the image of God. There is also an argument that Galatians 3:28 negates Genesis 2:24, which prescribes gender differences.

There are strong parallels between Galatians 3:28 and Colossians 3:11 ("Here there is no Gentile or Jew, circumcised or uncircumcised, barbarian, Scythian, slave or free, but Christ is all, and is in all.") and 1 Corinthians 12:13 ("For we were all baptized by one Spirit so as to form one body—whether Jews or Gentiles, slave or free—and we were all given the one Spirit to drink."). Bruce Hansen calls this "arguably the most prominent refrain in the Pauline corpus". Its influence has also been seen in Romans 3:9 and 10:12; 1 Corinthians 1:22–24, 7:18–22 and 10:32; and Ephesians 6:8.

== Specific issues ==
=== Pauline world view ===
Paul's world view was influenced by the contemporary cosmopolitanism - an ideal where all people are citizens of the cosmos.

=== Gender equality ===
Some believe that this verse, along with the New Testament household codes, is key to understanding debates about the role of women in Christianity. While some holding to biblical patriarchy or complementarianism argue that this verse appears within a context of justification and redemption, Christian egalitarians argue that the verse supports equal roles for men and women in Christianity and secular life. The verse has also been analyzed in queer theology. At the time, the verse could be considered a seditious attack on the Roman institution of patriarchal marriage.

While some scholars hold that Paul has the dissolution of gender roles in view, Matthew K. Robinson argues that the verse is more concerned with a "new covenantal identity" that denotes equality of value across social categories while not erasing gender distinction. Robinson writes,

Because the community of faith no longer depends upon social categories for value, Paul has no need to declare the abolition of the categories in 3:28. Thus, ‘There is neither Jew nor Greek, there is neither slave nor free, there is not male and female; for you are all one in Christ Jesus’ declares both that access to salvation is indiscriminate and that, in Christ, social categories have been relativised so as to afford all believers equal value, giving rise to a community of selfless servitude and love.

— Matthew K. Robinson, According to the Promise: Situating Galatians 3:28 Within Paul's Pneumatology, https://brill.com/downloadpdf/view/journals/evqu/92/4/article-p293_1.pdf

=== Slavery ===
The verse is used to argue for Christian abolitionism, the idea that Christianity considers slavery an evil and wants an end to it. New Testament scholar Darius Jankiewicz considers the verse the "Magna Carta of the abolitionists' movement". Abolitionists argued that the verse planted the seeds for future abolition of slavery, because accepting the spiritual equality of all believers made slavery inconceivable; black Christians also adopted this interpretation. Pro-slavery Christians disagreed, pointing to other passages in the Bible in which Paul commands slaves to obey their masters (Ephesians 6:5–9).

The passage was omitted from the slave bible because of fear that it could incite rebellion.

=== Racism ===
In 1957, Martin Luther King Jr. cited the passage in a pamphlet oppositing racial segregation in the United States. He wrote, "Racial segregation is a blatant denial of the unity which we all have in Christ." He also alluded to the verse at the end of his "I Have a Dream" speech.

== As a whole ==
Considered in its entirety, the verse is cited to support an egalitarian interpretation of Christianity.

According to Jakobus M. Vorster, the central question debated by theologians "is whether the statement in Galatians 3:28 about ecclesiastical relationships can be translated into a Christian-ethical norm for all human relationships". Vorster argues that it can, and that the verse provides a Christian foundation for the promotion of human rights and equality, in contrast to "patriarchy, racism and exploitation" which in his opinion are caused by human sinfulness. Robinson holds, however, that such arguments are largely anachronistic. Rather, Robinson argues, Paul is concerned with the new identity in Christ conferred upon believers when they receive the Spirit.

According to Karin Neutel, "Contemporary interpreters have updated Paul’s statement and added pairs to the three original ones: 'neither gay nor straight,' 'neither healthy nor disabled,' and 'neither black nor white.'... [The original] three pairs must have been as relevant in the first century, as the additional categories are today." She argues that the verse points to a utopian, cosmopolitan community.

== See also ==
- Uranopolitism, a Christian doctrine emphasising the union of people in the Christian faith and not in ethnicity or nationality

== General sources ==
- Buell, Denise Kimber; Hodge, Caroline Johnson (2004). "The Politics of Interpretation: The Rhetoric of Race and Ethnicity in Paul". Journal of Biblical Literature. 123 (2): 235–251. doi:10.2307/3267944. ISSN 0021-9231. JSTOR 3267944.
- Dunn, James D. G. (2015). Neither Jew nor Greek: A Contested Identity. Christianity in the Making Volume 3. Wm. B. Eerdmans Publishing. ISBN 978-1-4674-4385-2.
- Hansen, Bruce (2007). "All of you are one": The Social Vision of Gal 3:28, 1 Cor 12:13 and Col 3:11 (PDF) (PhD diss.). University of St Andrews.
- Jankiewicz, Darius (2016). "Hermeneutics of Slavery: A 'Bible-Alone' Faith and the Problem of Human Enslavement". Journal of Adventist Mission Studies. 12 (1): 47–73. ISSN 1553-9881.
- Kartzow, Marianne Bjelland (2010). ""Asking the Other Question": An Intersectional Approach to Galatians 3:28 and the Colossian Household Codes". Biblical Interpretation. 18 (4–5): 364–389. doi:10.1163/156851510X517591.
- Lategan, Bernard C. (2012). "Reconsidering the origin and function of Galatians 3:28". Neotestamentica. 46 (2): 274–286. ISSN 0254-8356.
- Litke, Wayne (1995). "Beyond creation: Galatians 3:28, Genesis and the hermaphrodite myth". Studies in Religion/Sciences Religieuses. 24 (2): 173–178. doi:10.1177/000842989502400204. S2CID 147794386.
- Martin, Troy W. (2003). "The Covenant of Circumcision (Genesis 17:9–14) and the Situational Antitheses in Galatians 3:28". Journal of Biblical Literature. 122 (1): 111–125. doi:10.2307/3268093. ISSN 0021-9231. JSTOR 3268093.
- Miller, Ed L. (2002). "Is Galatians 3:28 the Great Egalitarian Text?". The Expository Times. 114 (1): 9–11. doi:10.1177/001452460211400103. S2CID 170692743.
- Neutel, Karin B. (2015). A Cosmopolitan Ideal: Paul's Declaration "Neither Jew Nor Greek, Neither Slave Nor Free, Nor Male and Female" in the Context of First-Century Thought. Bloomsbury Publishing. ISBN 978-0-567-65684-1.
- Punt, Jeremy (2010). "Power and Liminality, Sex and Gender, and Gal 3:28. A Postcolonial, Queer Reading of an Influential Text". Neotestamentica. 44 (1): 140–166. ISSN 0254-8356. JSTOR 43048740.
- Ridderbos, Herman (1984). The Epistle of Paul to the Churches of Galatia. Wm. B. Eerdmans Publishing. ISBN 0-8028-2191-X.
- Stanley, Christopher D. (1997). "'Neither Jew Nor Greek': Ethnic Conflict in Graeco-Roman Society". Journal for the Study of the New Testament. 19 (64): 101–124. doi:10.1177/0142064X9701906406. S2CID 163007149.
- Tolmie, D. F. (2014). "Tendencies in the interpretation of Galatians 3:28 since 1990". Acta Theologica. 33 (2): 105. doi:10.4314/actat.v33i2S.6.
- van de Beek, Abraham (2002). "In Christ, There Is Neither Jew nor Greek – or Both Jew and Greek?". Faith and Ethnicity. Brill. pp. 19–36. doi:10.1163/9789004389137_003. ISBN 978-90-04-38913-7.
- Vorster, Jakobus M. (2019). "The Theological-Ethical Implications of Galatians 3:28 for a Christian Perspective on Equality as a Foundational Value in the Human Rights Discourse". In die Skriflig / In Luce Verbi. 53 (1). doi:10.4102/ids.v53i1.2494.
