= Epistle to the Galatians =

Book of the New Testament

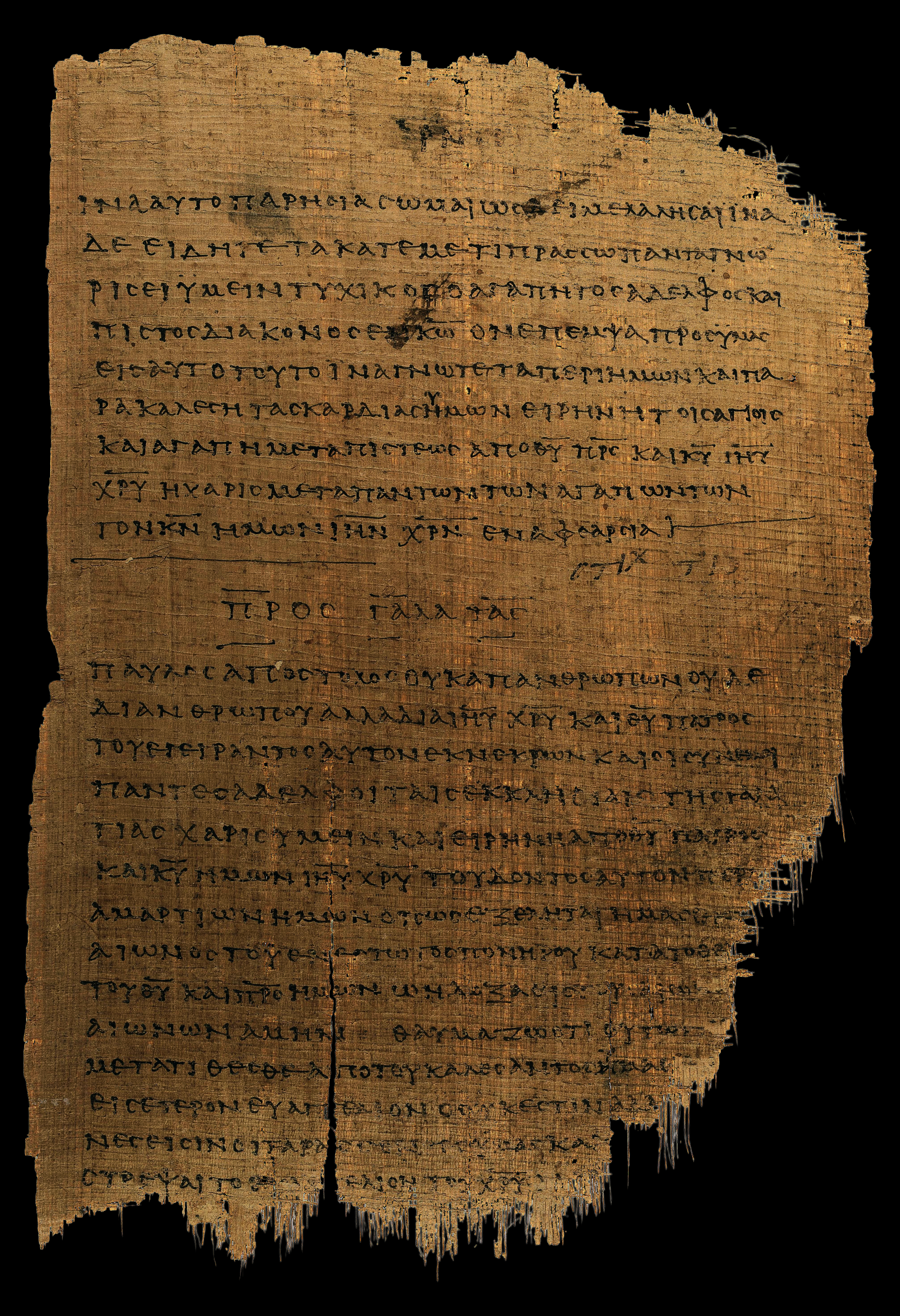
The end of Ephesians, continuing on to Galatians 1:1–8 on Papyrus 46 (fol. 158 recto; c. AD 200)

The Epistle to the Galatians (Note: The book is sometimes called the Letter of Paul to the Galatians, or simply Galatians. It is most commonly abbreviated as "Gal.") is the ninth book of the New Testament of the Christian Bible and the fourth of the Pauline epistles in traditional arrangement. It is a letter from Paul the Apostle to a number of Early Christian communities in Galatia. Scholars have suggested that this is either the Roman province of Galatia in southern Anatolia, or a large region defined by Galatians, an ethnic group of Celtic people in central Anatolia. The letter was originally written in Koine Greek and later translated into other languages.

In this letter, Paul is principally concerned with the controversy surrounding Gentile Christians and the Mosaic Law during the Apostolic Age. Paul argues that the Gentile Galatians do not need to adhere to the tenets of the Mosaic Law, particularly religious male circumcision, by contextualizing the role of the law in light of the revelation of Christ. The Epistle to the Galatians has exerted enormous influence on the history of Christianity, the development of Christian theology, and the study of the Apostle Paul.

The central dispute in the letter concerns the question of how Gentiles could convert to Christianity, which shows that this letter was written at a very early stage in church history, when the vast majority of Christians were Jewish or Jewish proselytes, which historians refer to as the Jewish Christians. Another indicator that the letter is early is that there is no hint in the letter of a developed organization within the Christian community at large. This puts it during the lifetime of Paul himself.

== Background ==
=== Surviving early manuscripts ===
The original of the letter (autograph) is not known to survive. Papyrus 46, the earliest reasonably complete version available to scholars today, dates to approximately AD 200, around 150 years after the original was drafted. This papyrus is fragmented in a few areas, causing some of the original text to be missing. The text of surviving manuscripts varies. Biblical scholar Bruce Metzger writes: "through careful research relating to paper construction, handwriting development, and the established principles of textual criticism, scholars can be rather certain about where these errors and changes appeared and what the original text probably said."

Surviving early complete and partial manuscripts include:

- Papyrus 46 (~AD 200)
- Codex Vaticanus (325-350)
- Codex Sinaiticus (330-360)
- Papyrus 51 (~400)
- Papyrus 99 (~400)
- Uncial 0176 (4th/5th century)
- Codex Alexandrinus (400-440)
- Codex Ephraemi Rescriptus (~450)
- Codex Freerianus (~450)
- Codex Claromontanus (~550)

=== Authorship and date ===
==== Authorship ====
Biblical scholars agree that Galatians is a true example of Paul's writing. The main arguments in favor of the authenticity of Galatians include its style and themes, which are common to the core letters of the Pauline corpus. The authenticity of Galatians is unquestioned in scholarship. George Duncan writes that "In every line it betrays its origin as a genuine letter of Paul." In his commentary on the epistle, writer James Burton Coffman wrote, "That the apostle Paul is indeed the author of this epistle is a fact so certain and so universally accepted that little needs to be said about it."

==== Date ====
A majority of scholars agree that Galatians was written between the late 40s and early 50s, although some date the original composition to c. 50–60. Jon Jordan notes that an interesting point to be made in the search for the dating of Galatians concerns whether or not it is a response to the Council of Jerusalem or a factor leading up to the Council. He writes, "did Paul's argument in Galatians flow out of the Jerusalem Council's decision, or did it come before the Jerusalem Council and possibly help shape that very decision?" It would have been enormously helpful to Paul's argument if he could have mentioned the decision of the Council of Jerusalem that Gentiles should not be circumcised. The absence of this argument from Paul strongly implies Galatians was written prior to the council. Since the council took place in 48–49 AD, and Paul evangelized South Galatia in 47–48 AD, the most plausible date for the writing of Galatians is 48 AD.

=== Audience ===
Paul's letter is addressed "to the churches of Galatia", but the location of these churches is a matter of debate. Most scholars agree that it is a geographical reference to the Roman province in central Asia Minor, which had been settled by immigrant Celts in the 270s BC and retained Gaulish features of culture and language in Paul's day. Acts records Paul traveling to the "region of Galatia and Phrygia", which lies immediately west of Galatia. Some scholars have argued that "Galatia" is an ethnic reference to Galatians, a Celtic people living in northern Asia Minor.

The New Testament indicates that Paul spent time personally in the cities of Galatia (Antioch of Pisidia, Iconium, Lystra and Derbe) during his missionary journeys. They seem to have been composed mainly of Gentile converts. After Paul's departure, the churches were led astray from Paul's trust/faith-centered teachings by individuals proposing "another gospel" (which centered on salvation through the Mosaic Law, so-called legalism), whom Paul saw as preaching a "different gospel" from what Paul had taught. The Galatians appear to have been receptive to the teaching of these newcomers, and the epistle is Paul's response to what he sees as their willingness to turn from his teaching.

The identity of these "opponents" is disputed. However, the majority of modern scholars view them as Jewish Christians, who taught that in order for converts to belong to the People of God, they must be subject to some or all of the Jewish Law (i.e. Judaizers). The letter indicates controversy concerning circumcision, Sabbath observance, and the Mosaic Covenant. It would appear, from Paul's response, that they cited the example of Abraham, who was circumcised as a mark of receiving the covenant blessings. They certainly appear to have questioned Paul's authority as an apostle, perhaps appealing to the greater authority of the Jerusalem church governed by James (brother of Jesus).

==== North Galatian view ====
The North Galatian view holds that the epistle was written very soon after Paul's second visit to Galatia. In this view, the visit to Jerusalem, mentioned in Galatians 2:1–10, is identical with that of Acts 15, which is spoken of as a thing of the past. Consequently, the epistle seems to have been written after the Council of Jerusalem. The similarity between this epistle and the epistle to the Romans has led to the conclusion that they were both written at roughly the same time, during Paul's stay in Macedonia in roughly 56–57.

This third date takes the word "quickly" in Gal. 1:6 literally. John P. Meier suggests that Galatians was "written in the middle or late 50s, only a few years after the Antiochene incident he narrates". Eminent biblical scholar Helmut Koester also subscribes to the "North Galatian Hypothesis". Koester points out that the cities of Galatia in the north consist of Ankyra, Pessinus, and Gordium (of the Gordian Knot fame of Alexander the Great).

==== South Galatian view ====
The South Galatian view holds that Paul wrote Galatians before the First Jerusalem Council, probably on his way to it, and that it was written to churches he had presumably planted during either his time in Tarsus (he would have traveled a short distance, since Tarsus is in Cilicia) after his first visit to Jerusalem as a Christian, or during his first missionary journey, when he traveled throughout southern Galatia. If it was written to the believers in South Galatia, it would likely have been written in 49.

==== Earliest epistle ====
A third theory is that Galatians 2:1–10 describes Paul and Barnabas' visit to Jerusalem described in Acts 11:30 and 12:25. This theory holds that the epistle was written before the Council was convened, possibly making it the earliest of Paul's epistles. According to this theory, the revelation mentioned (Gal. 2:2) corresponds with the prophecy of Agabus (Acts 11:27–28). This view holds that the private speaking about the gospel shared among the Gentiles precludes the Acts 15 visit, but fits perfectly with Acts 11. It further holds that continuing to remember the poor (Gal. 2:10) fits with the purpose of the Acts 11 visit, but not Acts 15.

In addition, the exclusion of any mention of the letter of Acts 15 is seen to indicate that such a letter did not yet exist, since Paul would have been likely to use it against the legalism confronted in Galatians. Finally, this view doubts Paul's confrontation of Peter (Gal. 2:11) would have been necessary after the events described in Acts 15. If this view is correct, the epistle should be dated somewhere around 47, depending on other difficult-to-date events, such as Paul's conversion.

Kirsopp Lake found this view less likely and wondered why it would be necessary for the Jerusalem Council (Acts 15) to take place at all if the issue were settled in Acts 11:30/12:25, as this view holds. Defenders of the view do not think it unlikely an issue of such magnitude would need to be discussed more than once. New Testament scholar J.B. Lightfoot also objected to this view since it "clearly implies that his [Paul's] Apostolic office and labours were well known and recognized before this conference."

Defenders of this view, such as Ronald Fung, disagree with both parts of Lightfoot's statement, insisting Paul received his "Apostolic Office" at his conversion (Gal. 1:15–17; Acts 9). Fung holds, then, that Paul's apostolic mission began almost immediately in Damascus (Acts 9:20). While accepting that Paul's apostolic anointing was likely only recognized by the Apostles in Jerusalem during the events described in Galatians 2/Acts 11:30, Fung does not see this as a problem for this theory.

=== Paul's opponents ===
Scholars have debated whether it is possible to reconstruct the arguments against which Paul is arguing. Though these opponents have traditionally been designated as Judaizers, this classification has fallen out of favor in contemporary scholarship. Some instead refer to them as Agitators. While many scholars have claimed that Paul's opponents were circumcisionist Jewish followers of Jesus, the ability to make such determinations with a reasonable degree of certainty has been called into question. It has often been presumed that they traveled from Jerusalem, but some commentators have raised the question of whether they may have actually been insiders familiar with the dynamics of the community. Furthermore, some commentaries and articles pointed out the inherent problems in mirror-reading, emphasizing that there is not sufficient evidence to reconstruct the arguments of Paul's opponents. It is not enough to simply reverse his denials and assertions as it does not result in a coherent argument nor can it possibly reflect the thought processes of his opponents accurately. It is nearly impossible to reconstruct the opponents from Paul's text because their representation is necessarily polemical. All that can be said with any certainty is that they supported a different position of Gentile relations with Jews than Paul did.

== Outline ==
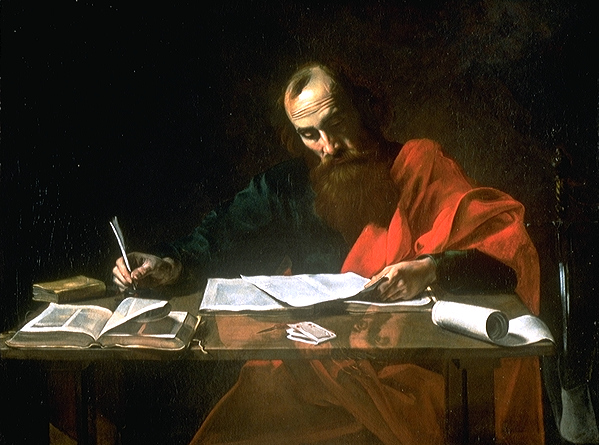
Valentin de Boulogne's depiction of "Saint Paul Writing His Epistles", 16th century (Blaffer Foundation Collection, Houston, Texas). Lightfoot notes with respect to verse 6:11 that at this point "the apostle takes the pen from his amanuensis, and the concluding paragraph is written with his own hand".

=== Introduction: The Cross and the Preeminence of the Gospel (1:1–10) ===
1. Prescript (1:1–5)
2. Rebuke: The Occasion of the Letter (1:6–10)

=== The Truth of the Gospel (1:11–2:21) ===
1. How Paul Received and Defended the Gospel: Paul and the "Pillars" (1:11–2:14)
2. The Truth of the Gospel Defined (2:15–21)

=== The Defense of the Gospel (3:1–5:12) ===
1. Rebuke and Reminder: Faith, Spirit, and Righteousness (3:1–6)
2. Argument: Abraham's Children through Incorporation into Christ by Faith (3:7–4:7)
3. Appeal (4:8–31)
4. Exhortation and Warning: Faith, Spirit, and Righteousness (5:1–12)

=== The Life of the Gospel (5:13–6:10) ===
1. The Basic Pattern of the New Life: Serving One Another in Love (5:13–15)
2. Implementing the New Life: Walking by the Spirit (5:16–24)
3. Some Specific Parameters of the New Life (5:25–6:6)
4. The Urgency of Living the New Life (6:7–10)

=== Closing: Cross and New Creation (6:11–18) ===
This outline is provided by Douglas J. Moo.

== Contents ==
This epistle addresses the question of whether the Gentiles in Galatia were obligated to follow Mosaic Law to be part of the Christ community. After an introductory address, the apostle discusses the subjects which had occasioned the epistle.

In the first two chapters, Paul discusses his life before Christ and his early ministry, including interactions with other apostles in Jerusalem. This is the most extended discussion of Paul's past that we find in the Pauline letters (cf. Philippians 3:1–7). Some have read this autobiographical narrative as Paul's defense of his apostolic authority. Others, however, see Paul's telling of the narrative as making an argument to the Galatians about the nature of the gospel and the Galatians' own situation. The two instances of the word "Judaism" in Galatians 1:13-14 are the only references to it in the whole New Testament; not until half a century later in the writings of Ignatius would "Judaism" and "Christianity" be considered two "religions".

Galatians 2:11-14 describes the incident at Antioch, a reported dispute between the apostles Paul and Peter over whether to continue following the Law of Moses on issues like circumcision.

Chapter 3 exhorts the Galatian believers to stand fast in the faith as it is in Jesus. Paul engages in an exegetical argument, drawing upon the figure of Abraham and the priority of his faith to the covenant of circumcision. Paul explains that the law was introduced as a temporary measure, one that is no longer efficacious now that the seed of Abraham, Christ, has come. Chapter 4 then concludes with a summary of the topics discussed and with the benediction, followed by 5:1–6:10 teaching about the right use of their Christian freedom. Chapter 5 also discusses circumcision.

In the conclusion of the epistle, Paul wrote, "See with what large letters I am writing to you with my own hand." (Galatians 6:11, ESV) Regarding this conclusion, Lightfoot, in his Commentary on the epistle, says:

At this point the apostle takes the pen from his amanuensis, and the concluding paragraph is written with his own hand. From the time when letters began to be forged in his name it seems to have been his practice to close with a few words in his own handwriting, as a precaution against such forgeries ... In the present case he writes a whole paragraph, summing up the main lessons of the epistle in terse, eager, disjointed sentences. He writes it, too, in large, bold characters (Gr. pelikois grammasin), that his hand-writing may reflect the energy and determination of his soul.

Some commentators have postulated that Paul's large letters are owed to his poor eyesight, his deformed hands, or to other physical, mental, or psychological afflictions. Other commentators have attributed Paul's large letters to his poor education, his attempt to assert his authority, or his effort to emphasize his final words. Classics scholar Steve Reece has compared similar autographic subscriptions in thousands of Greek, Roman, and Jewish letters of this period and observes that large letters are a normal feature when senders of letters, regardless of their education, take the pen from their amanuensis and add a few words of greeting in their own hands.

Galatians 5:14 mentions the Great Commandment. Galatians 5:22-23 describes the Fruit of the Holy Spirit, a list of attributes the author says indicate people living in accord with the Holy Spirit. Lists of virtues like this and also of vices (such as those found immediately prior in Galatians 5:19-21) were a form of ethical instruction very common in the Greco-Roman world and a popular formulation of ancient Christian ethics.

Probably the most famous single statement made in the Epistle, by Paul, is in chapter 3, verse 28: "There is neither Jew nor Gentile, neither slave nor free, nor is there male and female, for you are all one in Christ Jesus." The debate surrounding that verse is legend and the two schools of thought are (1) this only applies to the spiritual standing of people in the eyes of God, it does not implicate social distinctions and gender roles on earth; and (2) this is not just about our spiritual standing but is also about how we relate to each other and treat each other in the here and now.

Position (1) emphasises the immediate context of the verse and notes that it is embedded in a discussion about justification: our relationship with God. Position (2) reminds its critics that the "whole letter context" is very much about how people got on in the here and now together, and in fact the discussion about justification came out of an actual example of people treating other people differently (2:11ff).

== Major issues ==
=== Paul and the law ===
Much variety exists in discussions of Paul's view of the Law in Galatians. Nicole Chibici-Revneanu noticed a difference in Paul's treatment of the Law in Galatians and Romans. In Galatians the law is described as the "oppressor" whereas in Romans Paul describes the Law as being just as much in need of the Spirit to set it free from sin as humans are. Peter Oakes argues that Galatians cannot be construed as depicting the law positively because the Law played the role it was meant to play in the scope of human history. Wolfgang Reinbold argues that, contrary to the popular reading of Paul, the Law was possible to keep.

=== Under law and works of law ===
Regarding "under the law" (Gal. 3:23; 4:4, 5, 21; 5:18), Todd Wilson argues that "under the law" in Galatians was a "rhetorical abbreviation for 'under the curse of the law'". Regarding "works of the law" (Gal. 2:16), Robert Keith Rapa argues Paul is speaking of viewing Torah-observances as the means of salvation which he is seeking to combat in the Galatian congregation. Jacqueline de Roo noticed a similar phrase in the works found at Qumran and argues that "works of the law" is speaking of obedience to the Torah acting as a way of being atoned for. Michael Bachmann argues that this phrase is a mention of certain actions taken by Jewish people to distinguish themselves and perpetuate separation between themselves and Gentiles.

=== Law of Christ ===
Much debate surrounds what Paul means by "law of Christ" in Galatians 6:2, a phrase that occurs only once in all of Paul's letters. As Schreiner explains, some scholars think that the "law of Christ" is the sum of Jesus's words, functioning as a "new Torah for believers". Others argue that the "genitive in the 'law of Christ' 'should be understood as explanatory, i.e. the law which is Christ'". Some focus on the relationship between the law of Christ and the Old Testament Decalogue. Still other scholars argue that whereas the "Mosaic law is abolished", the new "law of Christ fits with the Zion Torah", which "hails from Zion ... and is eschatological". Schreiner himself believes that the law of Christ is equivalent to Galatians 5:13–14's "law of love". According to Schreiner, when believers love others, "they behave as Christ did and fulfill his law".

=== Antioch incident ===
As Thomas Schreiner explains, there is significant debate over the meaning of Peter's eating with the Gentiles—specifically, why might the eating have been considered wrong? E. P. Sanders argues that though Jews could eat in the same location with Gentiles, Jews did not want to consume food from the same vessels used by Gentiles. As Sanders explains, Galatia's Jews and Gentiles might have had to share the same cup and loaf (i.e. food from the same vessels). Other scholars such as James Dunn argue that Cephas was "already observing the basic food laws of the Torah" and then "men from James advocated an even stricter observance". Schreiner himself argues that Peter "actually ate unclean food—food prohibited by the OT law—before the men from James came". Depending on how one construes "eating with the Gentiles" in Galatians 2:12, one may reach different conclusions as to why Paul was so angry with Peter in Antioch.

=== Pistis tou Christou ===
There is debate about the meaning of the phrase δια πιστεος Χριστου in Galatians 2:16. Grammatically, this phrase can be interpreted either as an objective genitive "through faith in Jesus Christ" or as a subjective genitive "through the faith of Jesus Christ". There are theological ramifications to each position, but given the corpus of the Pauline literature, the majority of scholars have treated as an objective genitive, translating it as "faith in Jesus Christ". Daniel Harrington writes, "the subjective genitive does not oppose or do away with the concept of faith in Christ. Rather, it reestablishes priorities. One is justified by the faith of Jesus Christ manifested in his obedience to God by his death upon the cross. It is on the basis of that faith that one believes in Christ".

=== Sexuality and gender ===
Galatians 3:28 says, "There is no longer Jew or Greek, there is no longer slave or free, there is no longer male and female; for all of you are one in Christ Jesus." According to Norbert Baumert, Galatians 3:28 is Paul's declaration that one can be in relationship with Jesus no matter their gender. Judith Gundry-Volf argues for a more general approach, stating that one's gender does not provide any benefit or burden. Pamela Eisenbaum argues that Paul was exhorting his readers to be mindful in changing conduct in relationships that involved people of different status. Ben Witherington argues that Paul is combatting the position espoused by opponents who were attempting to influence Paul's community to return to the patriarchal standards held by the majority culture.

There are two different interpretations within the modern scholarship regarding the meaning and function of Paul's statement that "there is no longer male and female". The first interpretation states that Paul's words eliminate the biological differences between males and females and thus calls gender roles into question. Nancy Bedford says that this does not mean that there is no distinction between males and females; instead, it means that there is no room for gender hierarchy in the gospel. The second interpretation, outlined by Jeremy Punt, argues that "there is no longer [...] male or female; for all of you are one in Christ Jesus" refers only to the universality of salvation through Christ—which does not discriminate ethnicity, social status or gender—but is not intended to communicate any ideology of gender equality. Punt contends that here, Paul's intention was to fix social conflicts rather than to alter gender norms; by stating the importance of becoming one in Christ, Paul tries to give his society a new identity (i.e., the identity "in Christ"), thereby putatively encouraging concord between believers—without thence advocating any substantive changes to the role or rights of women. Richard Hove argues that, "While the expression 'you are all one' doubtless implies some notion of equality for Jew/Gentiles, slave/free, man/woman, it does not follow that men and women are equal in all regards."

=== Meaning of "Israel of God" ===
Many scholars debate the meaning of the phrase "Israel of God" in Galatians 6:16, wherein Paul wishes for "peace and mercy" to be "even upon the Israel of God". As Schreiner explains, scholars debate whether "Israel of God" refers to ethnically Jewish believers "within the church of Jesus Christ", or to the church of Christ as a whole (Jewish and Gentiles all included). Those who believe that "Israel of God" only refers to ethnically Jewish believers, argue that had Paul meant the entire church, he would use the word "mercy" before "peace", because Paul "sees peace as the petition for the church, while mercy is the request for unredeemed Jews". Other scholars, such as G. K. Beale, argue that the Old Testament backdrop of Galatians 6:16—e.g. a verse such as Isaiah 54:10 wherein God promises mercy and peace to Israel—suggests that "the Israel of God" refers to a portion of the new, eschatological Israel "composed of Jews and Gentiles".

== Significance and reception ==
=== Luther's theology and antisemitism ===
Martin Luther's fundamental belief in justification by faith was formed in large part by his interpretation of Galatians. Masaki claims

At the heart of Luther's Lectures on Galatians is the doctrine of the proper distinction between law and gospel. While Luther's contemporary opponents failed to see this—whether they were the papists, enthusiasts, Anabaptists, Sacramentarians, or antinomians—law/gospel articulation defined Luther's legacy in the thinking of his colleagues, students, and generations after him.

This distinction of law and gospel has been imperative to Luther's understanding of Paul's Judaism as well, but modern scholarship has formed a new perspective of the Judaism of Paul's time. "Luther's treatment of Galatians has affected most interpretations of the letter, at least among Protestants, up to the present time... Problems with Luther's interpretations and perspectives have become evident in modern times, particularly in his understanding and treatment of Judaism in Paul's day.

This development led to some schools of thought, such as Canadian religious historian Barrie Wilson who points out in How Jesus Became Christian, how Paul's Letter to the Galatians represents a sweeping rejection of Jewish Law (Torah). In so doing, Paul clearly takes his Christ movement out of the orbit of Judaism and into an entirely different milieu. Paul's stance constitutes a major contrast to the position of James, brother of Jesus, whose group in Jerusalem adhered to the observance of Torah.

=== Gender, sexuality, and modern scholarship ===
Galatians 3:28 is one of the most controversial and influential verses in Galatians. There are three different pairs that Paul uses to elaborate his ideology. The first one is "Jew or Greek", the second one is "slave or free", and the third one is "male and female"; Paul states that in Jesus Christ there is no longer a distinction between them. However, the meaning of this verse is not expounded upon further by Paul. In 21st century American politics, the debate about the meaning of Galatians 3:28 is significant, as it is used by different people and scholars in order to make claims about sexuality, gender, and marriage.

== See also ==
- Paul the Apostle and Judaism
- Prayer of St. John Gabriel Perboyre to Jesus
- Textual variants in the Epistle to the Galatians

== Cited works ==
- Betz, H. D. (2007), "Galatians, Epistle to the", Yale Anchor Bible Dictionary, Yale University Press, ISBN 978-0-30014081-1.
- Fung, Ronald Y. K. (1988), The Epistle to the Galatians, Grand Rapids, MI: Eerdman's Press, ISBN 0-8028-2509-5.
- Schreiner, Thomas R. (2010), Galatians, Grand Rapids, MI: Zondervan, ISBN 978-0-310-24372-4, OCLC 613993871.
- Stanton, G. N. (2007). "67. Galatians". In Barton, John; Muddiman, John (eds.). The Oxford Bible Commentary (first (paperback) ed.). Oxford University Press. pp. 1152–1165. ISBN 978-0199277186.

Epistle to the Galatians Pauline Epistle
Preceded by Second Corinthians	New Testament; Books of the Bible	Succeeded by Ephesians
