= Papyrus 46 =

Early Greek New Testament manuscript

- New Testament manuscript
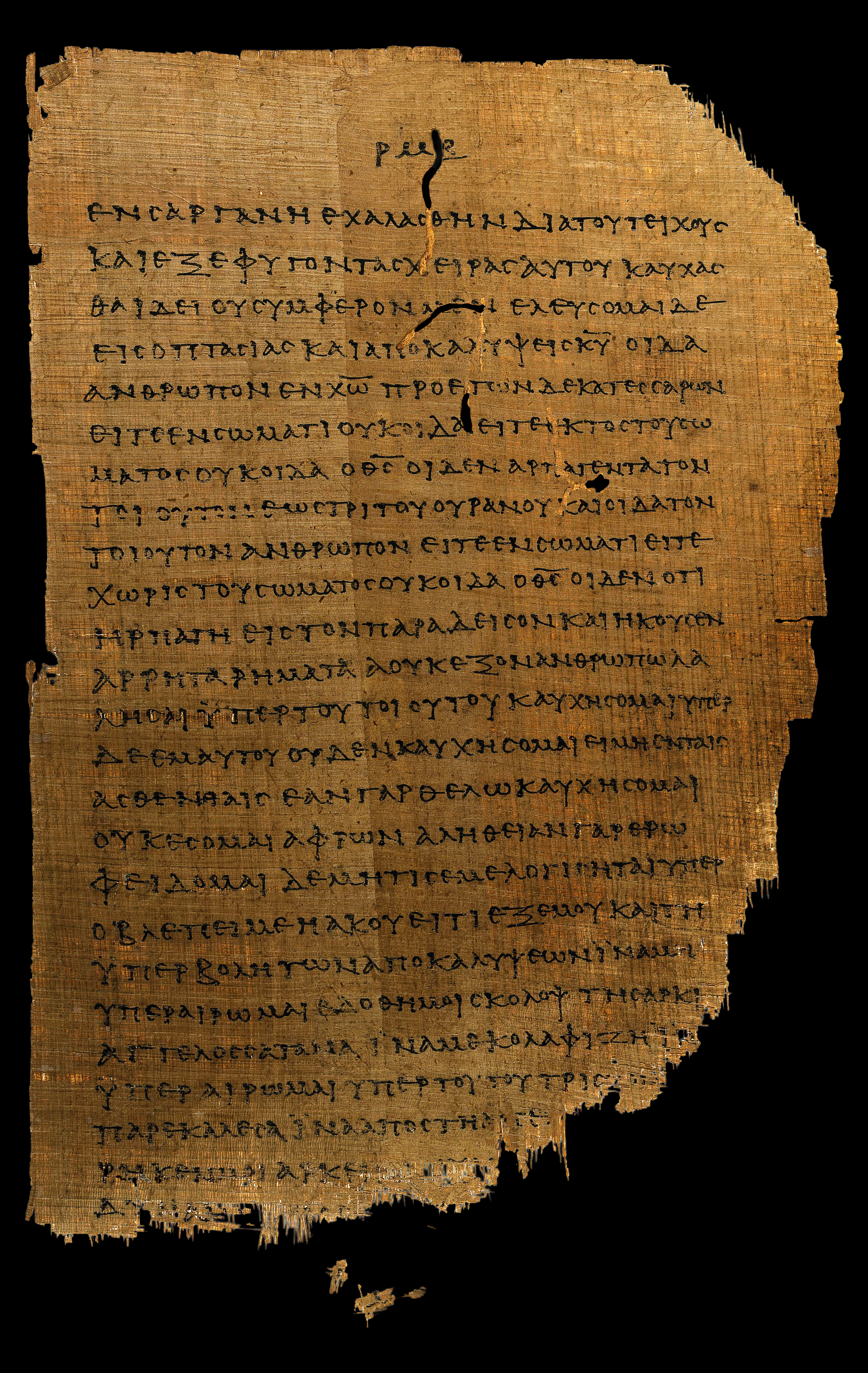
- A folio from 𝔓^{46} containing 2 Corinthians 11:33–12:9. As with other folios of the manuscript, text is lacunose at the bottom.
- Name: P. Chester Beatty II; Ann Arbor, Univ. of Michigan, Inv. 6238
- Sign: 𝔓^{46}
- Text: Pauline epistles
- Date: c. 175–225
- Script: Greek
- Now at: Dublin, University of Michigan
- Cite: Sanders, A Third Century Papyrus Codex of the Epistles of Paul
- Size: 28 cm by 16 cm
- Type: Alexandrian text-type
- Category: I
- Note: Affinity with Minuscule 1739

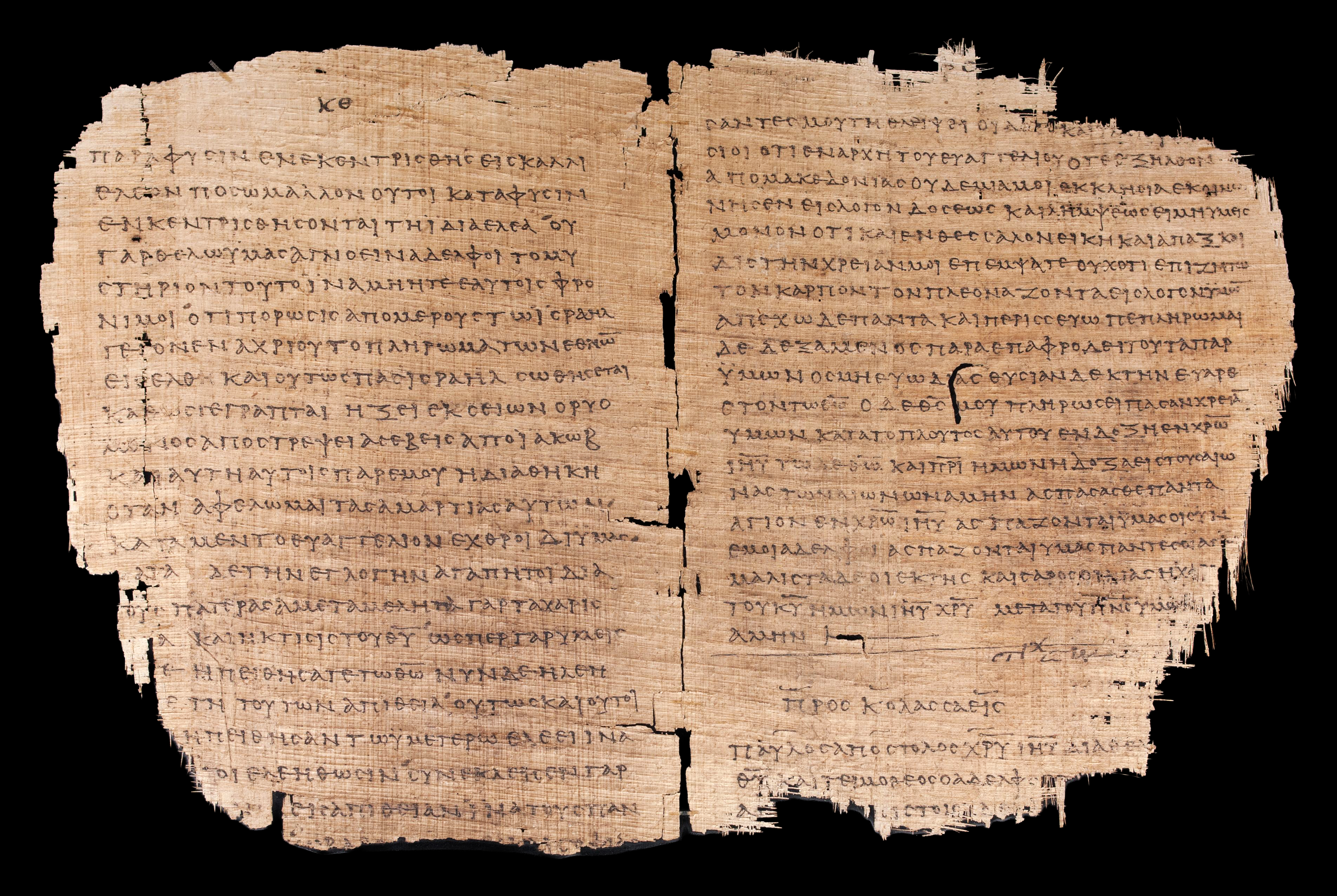
Bifolio from Paul's Letter to the Romans (left half) and the end of Paul's Letter to the Philippians and the beginning of Paul's Letter to the Colossians (right half).

Papyrus 46, also known as P. Chester Beatty II, is an early Greek New Testament manuscript written on papyrus, and is one of the manuscripts comprising the Chester Beatty Papyri. It is designated by the siglum 𝔓^{46} in the Gregory-Aland numbering of New Testament manuscripts. Manuscripts among the Chester Beatty Papyri have had several provenances associated with them, the most likely being the Faiyum. Using the study of comparative writing styles (palaeography), it has been dated to between 175 and 225, or to the early 3rd century CE. It contains verses from the Pauline Epistles of Romans, 1 Corinthians, 2 Corinthians, Galatians, Ephesians, Colossians, Philippians, 1 Thessalonians, and Hebrews. Some leaves are part of the Chester Beatty Biblical Papyri, and others are in the University of Michigan Papyrus Collection.

In November 2020, the Center for the Study of New Testament Manuscripts (CSNTM) in conjunction with Hendrickson Publishers released a new 1:1 high-resolution imaged facsimile edition of 𝔓^{46} on black and white backgrounds, along with 𝔓^{45} and 𝔓^{47}.

== Description ==
The manuscript is a codex (the precursor to the modern book format) made from papyrus in single quire (this being the papyrus leaves placed on top of each other, and folded in half), with the folio size approximately 28 by 16 centimetres (11.0 in × 6.3 in). The text is written in single column, with the text-block averaging 11.5 centimetres (4.5 in), between 26 and 32 lines of text per page, although both the width of the rows and the number of rows per page increase progressively. Lines containing text at the bottom of each page are damaged (known as lacunose), with between 1–2 lines non-extant in the first quarter of the codex, 2–3 lines non-extant in the central half, and up to seven lines non-extant in the final quarter. Though unusual for ancient manuscripts, 𝔓^{46} has each page numbered.

Throughout Romans, Hebrews, and the latter chapters of 1 Corinthians, small and thick strokes or dots are found, usually agreed to be from the hand of a reader rather than the initial copyist, since the ink is always much paler than that of the text itself. They appear to mark sense divisions (similar to verse numbering found in Bibles), and are also found in portions of 𝔓^{45}, possibly evidence of reading in the community which held both codices. Edgar Ebojo made a case that these "reading marks" with or without space-intervals were an aid to readers, most likely in a liturgical context.

=== Nomina sacra ===
𝔓^{46} uses an extensive and well-developed system of nomina sacra. It contains the following nomina sacra (nominative case examples): Κ̅Σ̅ (κυριος / Lord) Χ̅Σ̅ or Χ̅Ρ̅Σ̅ (χριστος / anointed) Ι̅Η̅Σ̅ (Ιησους / Jesus) Θ̅Σ̅ (θεος / God) Π̅Ν̅Α̅ (πνευμα / Spirit) Υ̅Ι̅Σ̅ (υιος / Son) Σ̅Τ̅Ρ̅Ο̅Σ̅ (σταυρος / cross).

The use of nomina sacra has featured in discussions on the dating for 𝔓^{46}, with scholar Bruce Griffin arguing against scholar Young Kyu Kim, in part, that such an extensive usage of the nomina sacra system nearly eliminates any possibility of the manuscript dating to the 1st century. He admitted, however, that Kim's dating cannot be ruled out on this basis alone, since the exact provenance of the nomina sacra system itself is not well-established.

Papyrologist Philip Comfort, preferring a date c. 150–75, sees evidence that the scribe's exemplar made only limited use of nomina sacra, or used none at all. In several instances, the word for Spirit is written out in full where the context should require a nomen sacrum, suggesting the scribe was rendering nomina sacra where appropriate for the meaning but struggling with Spirit versus spirit, without guidance from the exemplar. The text also inconsistently uses either the short or the long contracted forms of Christ.

=== Contents ===
𝔓^{46} contains most of the Pauline epistles, though with some folios missing. It contains (in order): the last eight chapters of Romans; Hebrews; 1–2 Corinthians; Ephesians; Galatians; Philippians; Colossians; and two chapters of 1 Thessalonians. All of the leaves have lost some lines at the bottom through deterioration.

(CB = Chester Beatty Library; Mich. = University of Michigan)

Folio	Contents	Location
1–7	Romans 1:1–5:17	Missing
8	Rom 5:17–6:14	CB
9-10	Rom 6:14–8:15	Missing
11–15	Rom 8:15–11:35	CB
16–17	Rom 11:35–14:8	Mich.
18 (fragment)	Rom 14:9–15:11	CB
19–28	Rom 15:11–Hebrews 8:8	Mich.
29	Heb 8:9–9:10	CB
30	Heb 9:10–26	Mich.
31–39	Heb 9:26–1 Corinthians 2:3	CB
40	1 Cor 2:3–3:5	Mich.
41–69	1 Cor 3:6–2 Corinthians 9:7	CB
70–85	2 Cor 9:7–end, Ephesians, Galatians 1:1–6:10	Mich.
86–94	Gal 6:10–end, Philippians, Colossians, 1 Thessalonians 1:1–2:3	CB
95–96	1 Thess 2:3–5:5	Missing
97 (fragment)	1 Thess 5:5, 23–28	CB
98–104	Thought to be 1 Thess 5:28–2 Thessalonians, and possibly Philemon; as for 1–2 Timothy, and Titus (see below)	Missing

=== Missing contents ===
The contents of the seven missing leaves from the end is uncertain as they are lost. Kenyon calculated that 2 Thessalonians would require two leaves, leaving only five remaining leaves (10 pages) for the remaining canonical Pauline literature — 1 Timothy (estimated 8.25 pages), 2 Timothy (6 pages), Titus (3.5 pages) and Philemon (1.5 pages) — requiring ten leaves in total (19.25 pages). Thus Kenyon concluded 𝔓^{46} as originally constructed did not include the pastoral epistles.

Overall, Kenyon was open to different possibilities regarding the contents of the lost leaves at the end of the codex. He entertained the idea that the last five leaves could have been left blank or that additional leaves could have been added to the quire to create space for the pastoral letters. In 1998, Jeremy Duff vigorously argued in favor of Kenyon's second suggestion, emphasizing that the scribe of 𝔓^{46} was increasing the number of letters per page in the second half of the codex. Duff argued that this indicated that the scribe intended to include all of the traditional 14-letter collection and would most likely have added extra leaves if the original quire lacked sufficient space. Duff also pointed to several ancient codices that he considered as good evidence for the attachment of additional leaves to codices to allow for the inclusion of more material. The relevance of the ancient evidence that Duff presented has been challenged, but a survey of surviving examples of ancient single-quire codices does show evidence for the practice of leaving some blank pages at the end of a codex. However, this survey also showed that single-quire codices sometimes had more inscribed pages in the second half of the codex than in the first half (due to, for example, blank front fly-leaves). This leaves open the possibility that the original quire may have contained the traditional 14-letter collection after all. Brent Nongbri summarizes:

We still have much to learn about early single-quire codices and what constituted 'normal' practice for the makers of these books. Duff’s article performed a service by challenging a complacent and largely unreflective consensus with regard to the contents of the Beatty-Michigan Pauline epistles codex. Duff’s positive hypothesis about the addition of extra folia as an afterthought is, however, impossible to prove. And as we have seen, the material comparanda he adduced did not support his case. Yet, Duff’s argument serves as a good reminder that we cannot simply assume the contents of the missing folia. We cannot say, for instance, that the Beatty-Michigan codex is secure evidence for the circulation of a ten-letter collection of Paul’s letters, as has occasionally been argued. In fact, as we have seen, we must be cautious about assuming the contents of the missing folia at the end of the quire because we may have had too much confidence about our knowledge of the number of missing folia at the end of the quire. ...By tying his estimate of the size of the quire to the numbering of the pages, Kenyon may have created a false problem that has needlessly frustrated subsequent generations of scholars.

The question of the contents of the codex as originally constructed thus remains open.

== Text ==
The text of the codex is considered a representative of the Alexandrian text-type. The text-types are groups of different manuscripts which share specific or generally related readings, which then differ from each other group, and thus the conflicting readings can separate out the groups, which are then used to determine the original text as published; there are three main groups with names: Alexandrian, Western, and Byzantine. Biblical scholar Kurt Aland placed it in Category I of his New Testament manuscript classification system. Category I manuscripts are those "of a very special quality, i. e. manuscripts with a very high proportion of the early text... To this category have also been assigned all manuscripts to the beginning of the fourth century, regardless of further distinctions which should also be observed[.]"

Some notable readings

Romans 8:28

παντα συνεργει ό θεος εις αγαθον (God works all things together for good) - 𝔓^{46} A B 81 sa eth
παντα συνεργει εις αγαθον (all things work together for good) - Majority of manuscripts

Romans 16:15

Βηρεα και Αουλιαν - 𝔓^{46} (singular reading)
Ιουλιαν, Νηρεα - Majority of manuscripts

1 Corinthians 2:1

μυστηριον (mystery) - 𝔓^{46} א* Α C 88 436 it^{a, r} syr^{p} bo
σωτηριον (salvation) - ℓ 598 ℓ 593 ℓ 599
μαρτυριον (witness) - א^{c2} B Ψ Majority of manuscripts

1 Corinthians 2:4

πειθοις σοφιας (plausible wisdom) - 𝔓^{46} G
πειθοις σοφιας λογοις (plausible words of wisdom) - Majority of manuscripts

1 Corinthians 7:5

τη προσευχη (prayer) - 𝔓^{46} 𝔓^{11} א* Α B G Ψ 6 33 81 104 181 629 630 1739 1877 1881 1962 it vg cop arm eth
τη νηστεια και τη προσευχη (fasting and prayer) - א^{c2} 0150 256 365 Majority of manuscripts

1 Corinthians 12:9

εν τω πνευματι (by the Spirit) - 𝔓^{46} (singular reading)
εν τω ενι πνευματι (by one Spirit) - A B 0150 33 81 104 436 459 1175 1881 220 2464 vg

1 Corinthians 15:47

ανθρωπος πνευματικος (spiritual man) - 𝔓^{46} (singular reading)
ανθρωπος (man) - א* B C G 0243 33 1739 it vg bo eth
ανθρωπος ο κυριος (man, the Lord) - א^{c2} A Ψ 81 104 181 Majority of manuscripts

2 Corinthians 1:10

τηλικουτων θανατων (deadly perils) - 𝔓^{46} 630 1739^{c} it^{d, e} syr^{p, h} goth
τηλικουτου θανατου (a deadly peril) - Majority of manuscripts

Galatians 6:2

αποπληρωσετε - 𝔓^{46} (singular reading)
αναπληρωσατε - Majority of manuscripts

Ephesians 4:16

και ενεργειας - 𝔓^{46} (singular reading)
κατ ενεργειαν - Majority of manuscripts

Ephesians 6:12

μεθοδιας - 𝔓^{46} (singular reading)
αρχας προς τας εξουσιας - Majority of manuscripts

== Provenance ==
The provenance of the papyrus is unknown. Kenyon believed this codex and the other Beatty Biblical Papyri came from the region of the Fayyum. The coptologist Carl Schmidt was told that the books were found in "‘Alâlme, a village on the east bank of the Nile in the area of Aṭfiḥ, ancient Aphroditopolis." However, the archaeologists who bought the University of Michigan's portion of the codex believed that it had come from Asyut (ancient Lykopolis). Thus, there is no consensus on the precise find spot.

== Date ==
As with all manuscripts dated solely by palaeography, the dating of 𝔓^{46} is uncertain. H. A. Sanders, the first editor of parts of the papyrus, proposed a date possibly as late as the second half of the 3rd century. F. G. Kenyon, editor of the complete editio princeps, preferred a date in the first half of the 3rd century. The manuscript is now sometimes dated to about 200. Young Kyu Kim (Note: A thorough search of Google Books and the internet found nothing else from or about this author, except a 2015 thesis implying he was a professor at Calvin Theological Seminary.) has argued for an exceptionally early date of c. 80. Kim's dating has been widely rejected. Griffin critiqued and disputed Kim's dating, placing the 'most probable date' between 175 and 225, with a '95% confidence interval' for a date between 150 and 250.

Comfort and Barrett have claimed 𝔓^{46} shares palaeographical affinities with the following:

- P. Oxy. 8 (assigned late 1st or early 2nd century),
- P. Oxy. 841 (the second hand, which cannot be dated later than 125–50),
- P. Oxy. 1622 (dated with confidence to pre-148, probably during the reign of Hadrian (117–38), because of the documentary text on the verso),
- P. Oxy. 2337 (assigned to the late 1st century),
- P. Oxy. 3721 (assigned to the second half of the 2nd century),
- P. Rylands III 550 (assigned to the 2nd century), and
- P. Berol. 9810 (early 2nd century).

They conclude this points to a date during the middle of the 2nd century for 𝔓^{46}. More recently, in a wide-ranging survey of the dates of New Testament papyri, P. Orsini and W. Clarysse have assigned 𝔓^{46} "to the early third century," specifically "excluding dates in the first or the first half of the second century."

== See also ==
- Early Greek New Testament manuscripts
- List of New Testament papyri
- Collections of papyri
- Chester Beatty Papyri
- University of Michigan Papyrus Collection
