= Papyrus 99 =

- New Testament manuscript
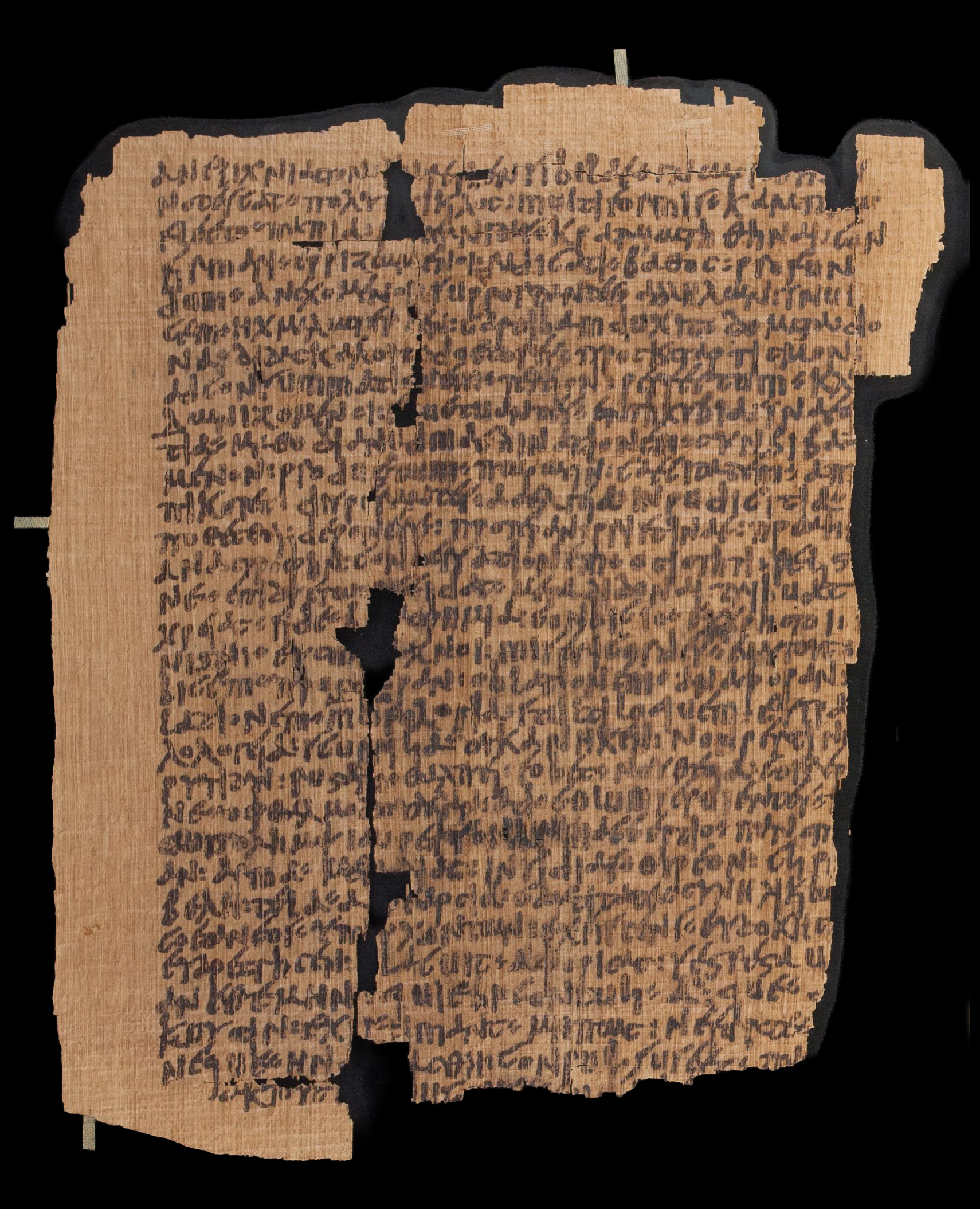
- 13 recto, Gal 1:14-16.20; 2:2-4; Eph 3:8.10.14-18; 4:2.8.11-14.16.18-19.22.24.26.28-29.31-32; 5:2.4.27.29; 6:4.6.9.11.16.24
- Name: P. Chester Beatty 1499
- Sign: 𝔓^{99}
- Text: A glossary(?) - single words and phrases from some Pauline epistle.
- Date: ca. 400
- Script: Greek-Latin
- Now at: Chester Beatty Library
- Size: 16.8 by 13.6

Papyrus 99 (Gregory-Aland), designated by 𝔓^{99}, is an early papyrus manuscript with quotations from the Pauline epistles of the New Testament in Greek-Latin. Four leaves have survived.

== Description ==
This papyrus is part of the Chester Beatty collection. It is usually considered as a glossary with single words and phrases from:

- Rom 1:1;
- 2 Cor 1:3-6, 1:6-17, 1:20-24, 2:1-9, 2:9-5:13, 5:13-6:3, 6:3-8:13, 8:14-22, 9:2-11:8, 11:9-23, 11:26-13:11;
- Gal 1:4-11, 1:18-6:15, 1:14-2:4, 2:4-3:19, 3:19-4:9;
- Eph 1:4-2:21, 1:22(?), 3:8-6:24

The text is written in 1 column per page, 27-30 lines per page.

It also contains a Latin lexicon and Greek grammar.

Elliot calls this papyrus '... a haphazard collection of unconnected verses from the Pauline letters [that] could have been a school exercise ...'

The manuscript is housed at the Chester Beatty Library (P. Chester B. Ac. 1499, fol 11–14) in Dublin.

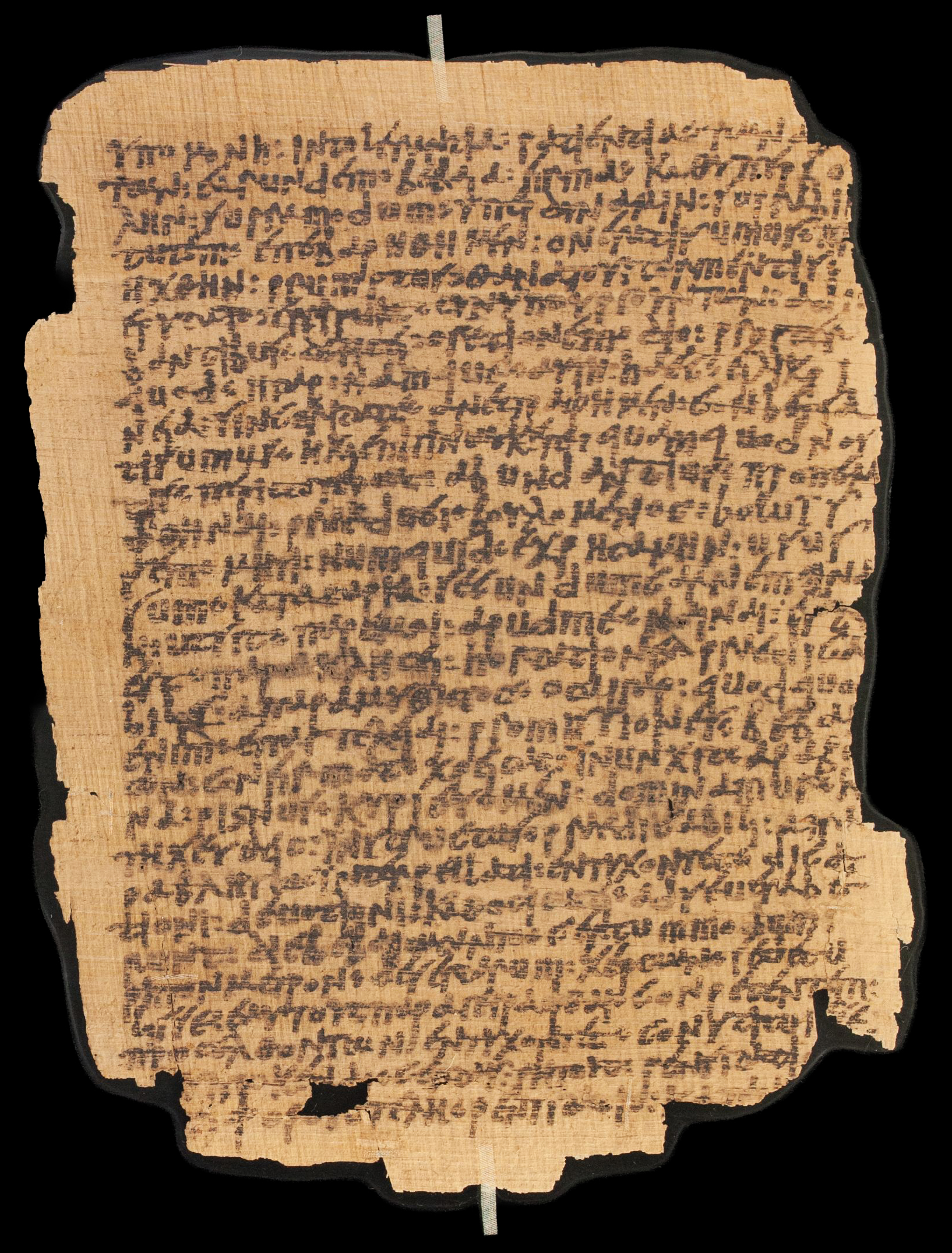
Fol 12 r, 2 Cor 1:6-13.16-17.20-22.24; 7:13

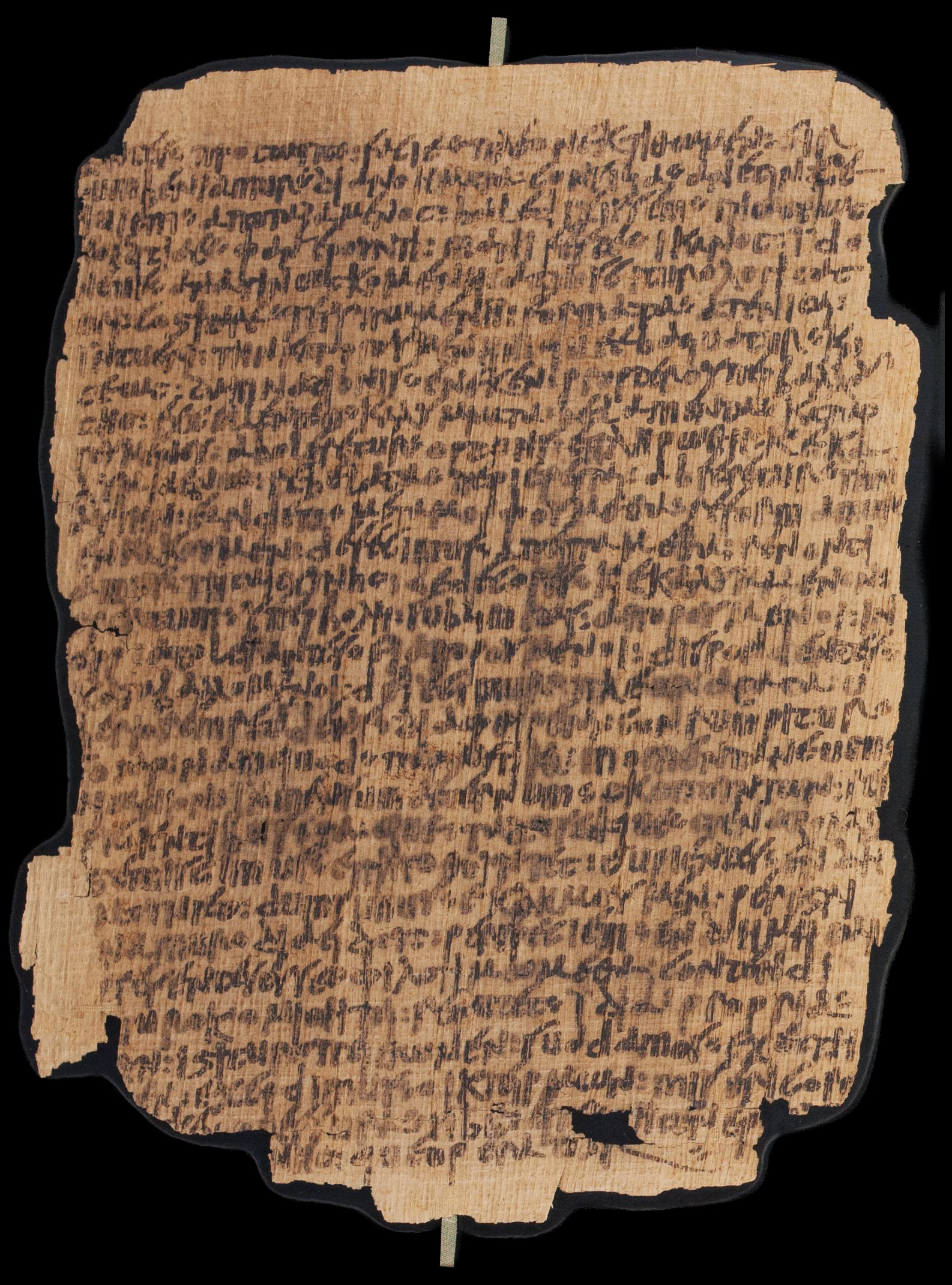
Fol 12v, 2 Cor 1:3-4.6; 2:10-11.13-14.16; 3:2.5.7.9-10.13-14.16.18; 4:1-3.7-9.15-18; 5:2.6-11.13

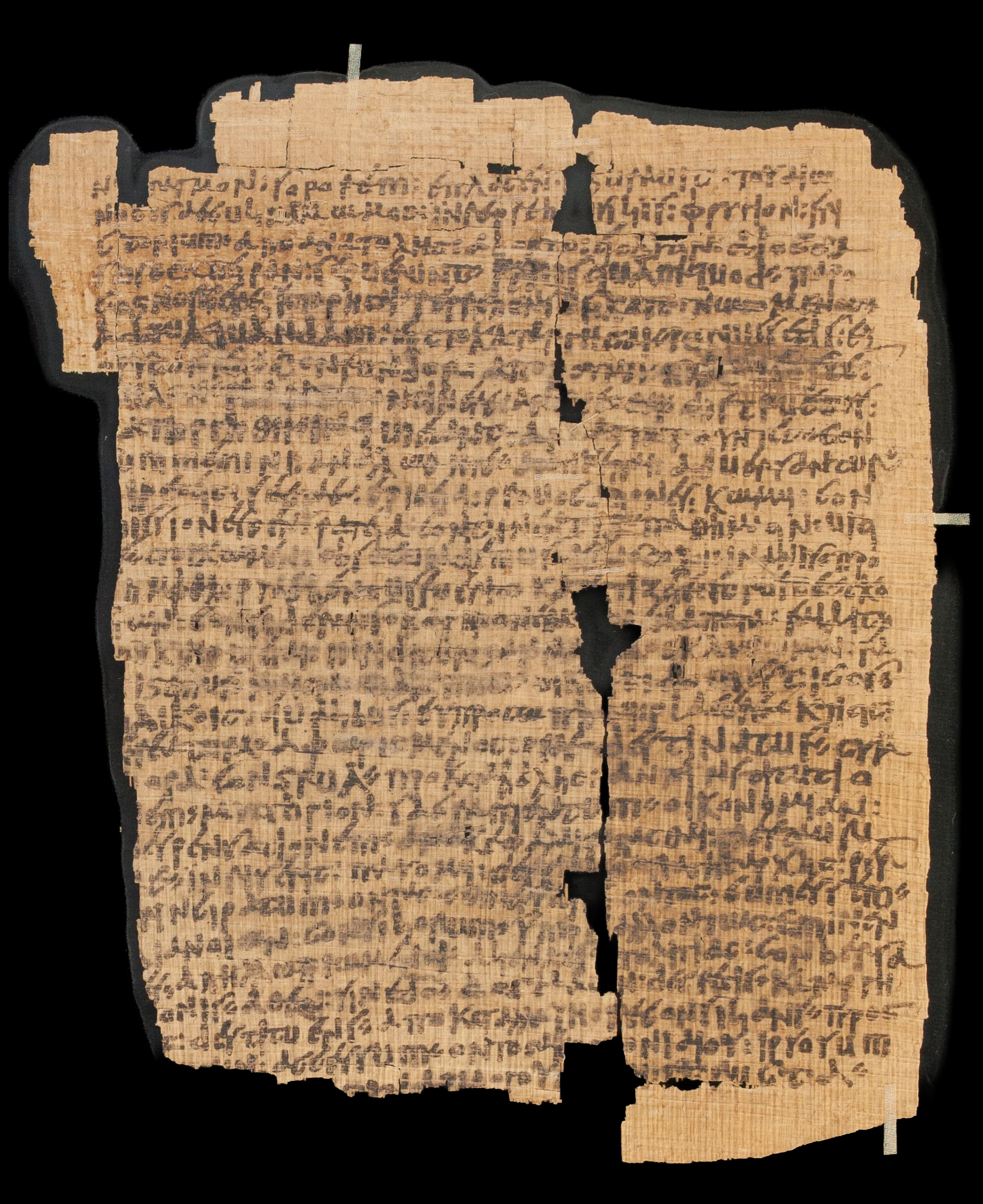
Fol. 13 verso, Rom 1:1; Gal 1:9.18; 2:11; 3:11.17; 4:15.20; 5:1.4.12.15.17.20-21.23-26; 6:1-3.7.9-12.15; Eph 1:4.9-10.16.21; 2:1.3.7.12.15-16.18.20-2

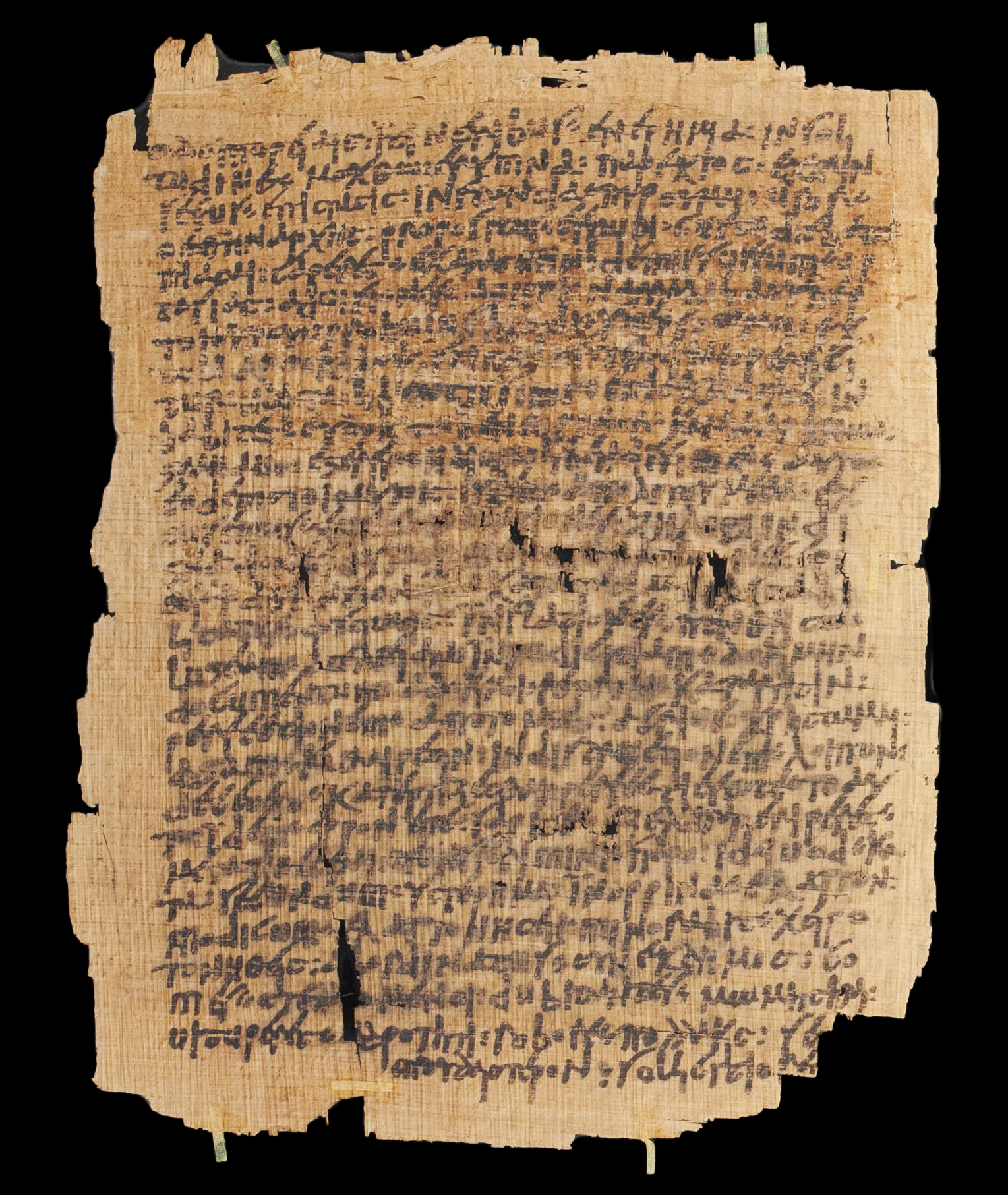
Fol 14 recto, 2 Cor 8:14-15.19-20.22; 11:26-29.32-33; 12:1.4-5.7.9-10.13.15.18-21; 13:3.6.9-11; Gal 1:4.6.9.11

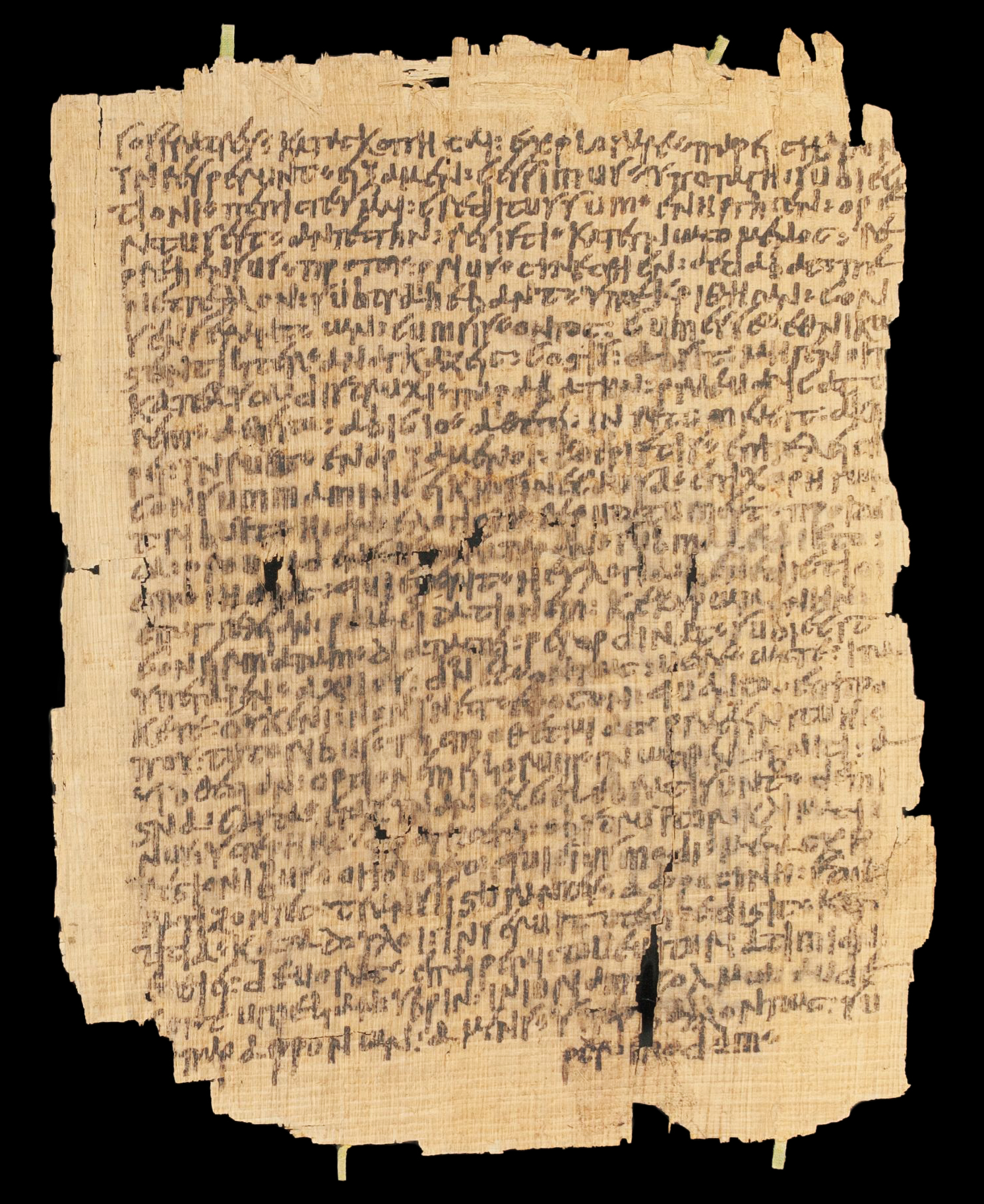
Fol 14 verso, 2 Cor 8:14-15.19-20.22; 11:26-29.32-33; 12:1.4-5.7.9-10.13.15.18-21; 13:3.6.9-11; Gal 1:4.6.9.11

== See also ==
- List of New Testament papyri
