= Nathaniel Henry Hutton =

Architect and civil engineer from Washington, D.C., United States

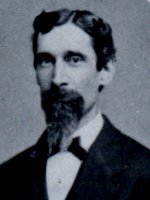
Nathaniel Henry Hutton

Major Nathaniel Henry Hutton (Washington, D.C. November 18, 1833–Baltimore, Maryland, May 8, 1907) was an American architect and civil engineer. He worked as a surveyor in the American West in the 1850s before participating in the Union Army defense of Baltimore in the American Civil War. After the war, he established an architectural practice in Baltimore. From 1876 until his death he was associated with the Harbor Board of Baltimore, serving as engineer, chief engineer, and President of the Board.

== Family ==
Nathaniel Henry "Harry" Hutton was the fourth of five children and youngest son of James Hutton (d. 1843) and his wife, the former Salome Rich, sister of bibliographer Obadiah Rich and botanist and explorer William Rich. Hutton was the brother of artist, surveyor and civil engineer William Rich Hutton and of artist, cartographer and pioneer photographer James D. Hutton.

Hutton married Meta M. Van Ness (1839–1907) daughter of Colonel Eugene Van Ness (1804–1862) of New York. They had one son, Nathaniel Henry Hutton Jr (1865–1923) and two daughters, Meta Van Ness Hutton (1867–1946) and Julia Van Ness Hutton (1861–1933).

== Career ==
Hutton was U. S. Assistant Engineer on explorations for the Pacific Railroad Surveys west of the Missouri River, on the 32nd and 35th parallels, from 1853 to 1856, including surveys for a route from Fort Smith via Albuquerque and the Colorado River to Los Angeles in 1853 and for a route from Benicia, California, to Fort Fillmore (now in New Mexico) in 1854–55. For the Department of the Interior, Hutton served as chief engineer of the El Paso and Fort Yuma wagon road in 1857 and 1858 (the southerly or "Oxbow Route" used by the Butterfield Overland Mail from 1858 until June 1861), and as surveyor on the western boundary of Minnesota in 1859 and 1860.

During the Civil War, Hutton served as U. S. Assistant Engineer on the Union defenses of Baltimore (1861–1865), achieving the rank of Major. Following the cessation of hostilities, he served as U. S. Assistant Engineer in charge of the improvement of the Patapsco River (1867 to 1876) and on the Western division of the Virginia Central Water Line (surveyed 1874–1875). Hutton was a charter member and vice president of the Engineers' Club of Baltimore.

Hutton formed an architectural partnership with John Murdoch from about 1867 to 1873, with offices on Lexington Street, east of Charles Street in Baltimore. The firm worked on the construction and alteration of churches, houses, and warehouses in Baltimore, Washington, Virginia and Pennsylvania. Their 1868 Norman Gothic St. Peter's Protestant Episcopal Church (since 1911, the Baltimore Bethel A. M. E. Church), is a registered historical site in Baltimore. From 1873 to 1880, Hutton maintained an architectural practice with his older brother William Rich Hutton. Hutton became a charter member of the Baltimore Chapter of the American Institute of Architects when it was created in 1870 and served as the Chapter's first Secretary. He was elected Chapter President, but resigned from both the presidency and the Chapter in 1876.

From 1876 until his death he was an engineer to the Harbor Board of Baltimore, eventually becoming Chief Engineer and president of the board. He was also U. S. Assistant Engineer in charge of surveys for a ship canal to connect the Chesapeake and Delaware Bays (1878–1879), and served as a consulting engineer for a project to build a ship canal between Philadelphia and the Atlantic Ocean {1894–1895} and for a projected ship canal to connect Lake Erie and the Ohio River in 1895–1896.

Hutton died in Baltimore on May 8, 1907. His wife died on August 30 of the same year. They are buried in the Greenmont Cemetery in Baltimore. A collection of documents relating to his work with the Baltimore Harbor Board and other papers is housed as MS.1323 (40 items, 1876–1877) by the Maryland Historical Society.
