= William Rich Hutton =

Artist, surveyor, and civil engineer from the United States

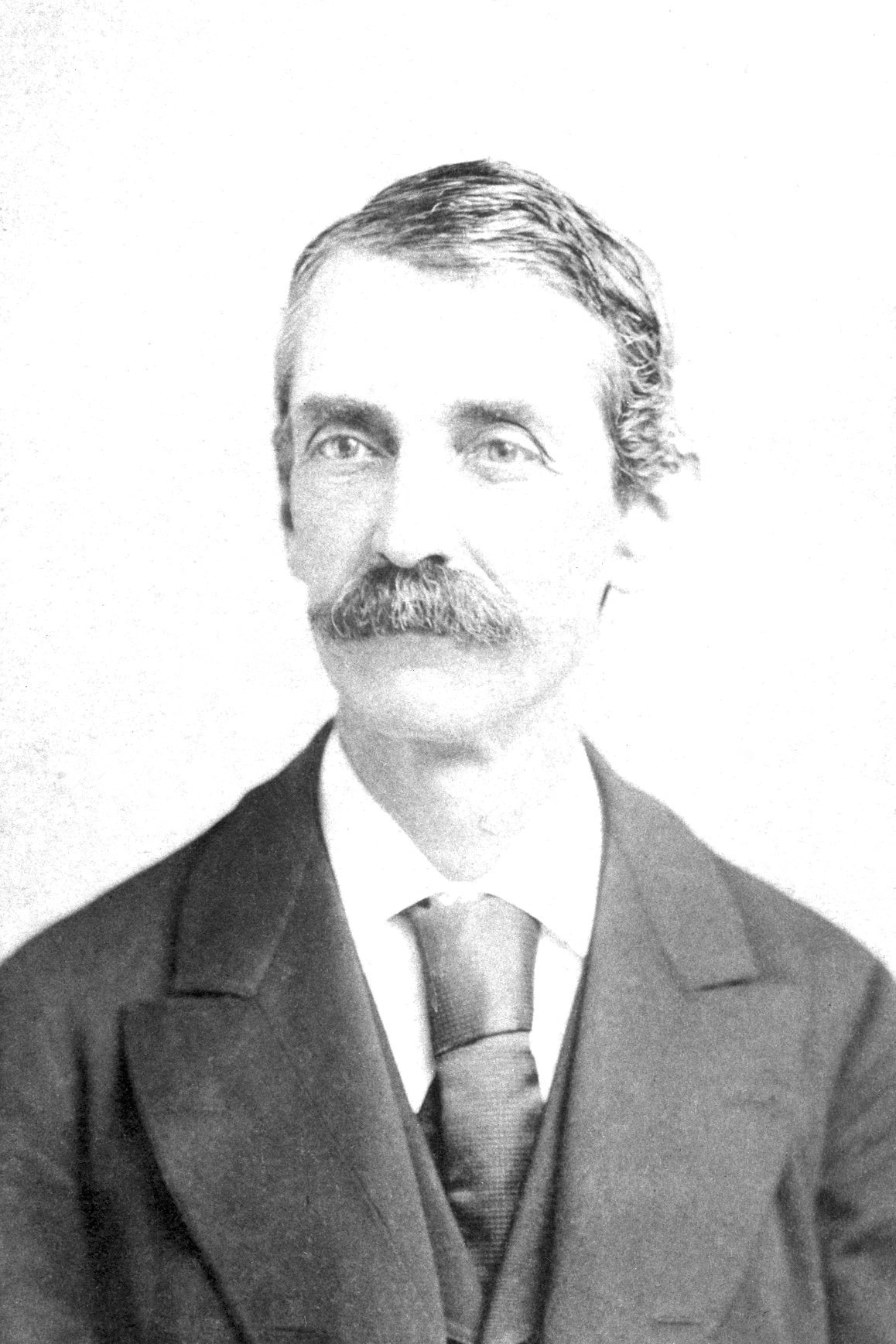
William Rich Hutton in 1880

William Rich Hutton (March 21, 1826 – December 11, 1901) was a surveyor and artist who became an architect and civil engineer in Maryland and New York in the latter half of the 19th century. His sketches of the pueblo of Los Angeles and diary of his life as a surveyor in California were published by the Huntington Library.

== Early life and California ==
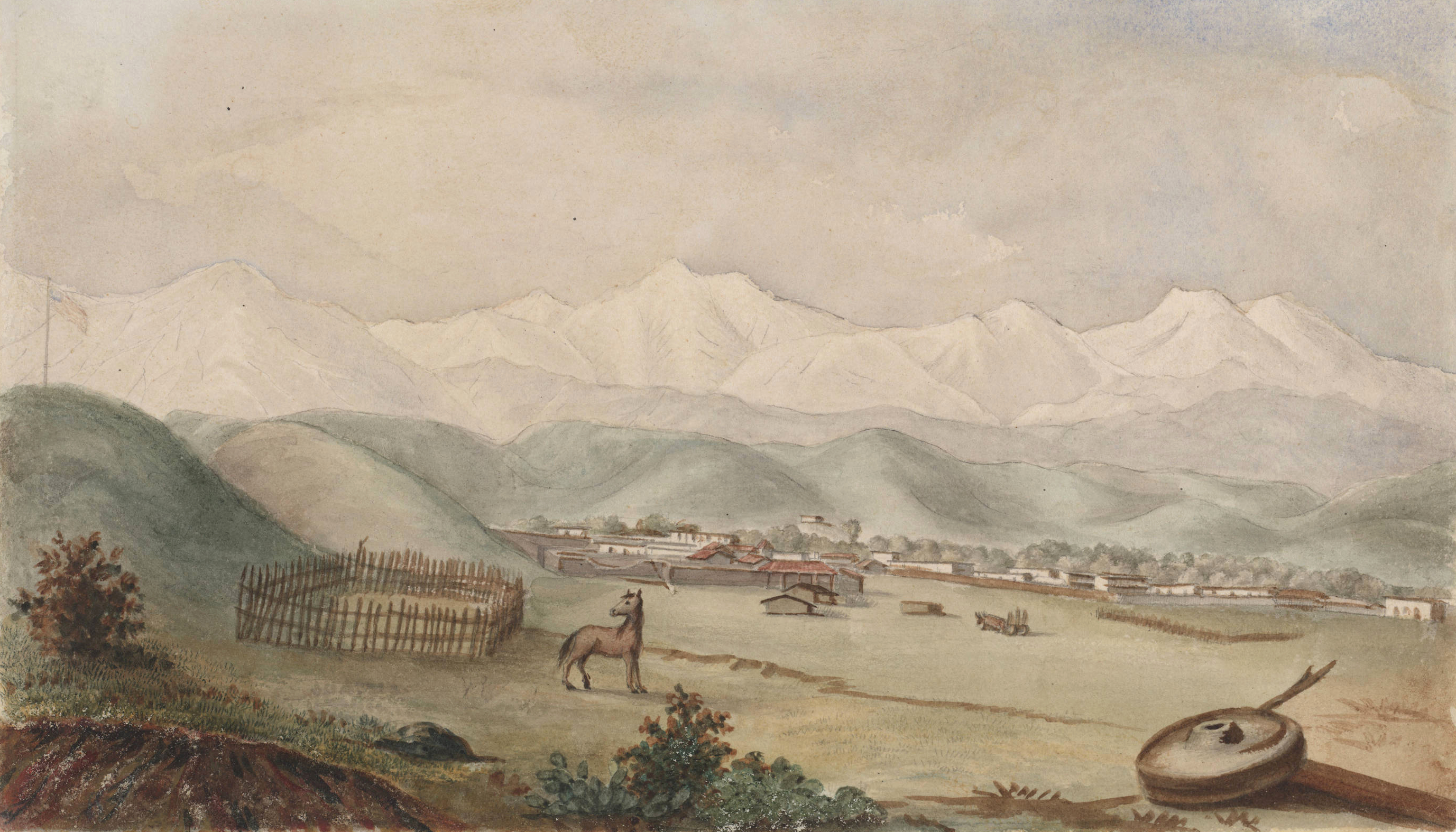
Los Angeles from the South, by W. R. Hutton, 1848

William Rich Hutton was born on March 21, 1826, in Washington, D.C. He was the eldest son of James Hutton (d. 1843) and his wife, the former Salome Rich, sister of bibliographer Obadiah Rich and botanist and explorer William Rich. He studied mathematics, drawing and surveying at the Benjamin Hallowell School in Alexandria, Virginia. Hutton traveled with his uncle William Rich to California in 1847 as a payroll clerk for the US volunteer forces in the Mexican–American War, accompanied by his younger brother James D. Hutton, also an artist and surveyor.

William Hutton remained in California for six years before returning east in 1853. His diaries and drawings record his travel west via Panama and his six years in California, including a surveying expedition to Los Angeles in June 1849 with Lieutenant Edward O.C. Ord. Ord and Hutton mapped Los Angeles in July and August 1849. Lieutenant Ord surveyed the pueblo; Hutton sketched many scenes of the pueblo and drew the first map from Ord's survey, recording street names in both Spanish and English for the first time. In July 1850, Hutton was appointed county surveyor of San Luis Obispo County, a position he held until resigning on August 4, 1851.

The Hutton's vireo is named after him.

== Engineering career ==
Returned to Maryland, Hutton became the assistant engineer for the Metropolitan Railroad in 1853. He was an assistant engineer to General Montgomery C. Meigs on the Washington Aqueduct and Cabin John Bridge from 1855, succeeding Meigs as chief engineer in 1862–63. He later served as chief engineer for the Annapolis Water Works (1866), the Chesapeake & Ohio Canal, and the Western Maryland Railroad (1871).

He played a significant role in the later years of the Chesapeake and Ohio Canal. He served as chief engineer from 1869 to 1871, and as a consulting engineer until 1880. Under him, the canal was widened to its full prism width, and had augmented the banks to resist flooding. He also worked on macadamizing the towpath, dredging the Rock Creek basin, and the Georgetown inclined plane.

Hutton also practiced as an architect, working in partnership with his youngest brother Nathaniel Henry Hutton (1834–1907) between 1873 and 1880, but little is known of his work in this field. He relocated to New York in the 1880s, serving as chief engineer for the Washington Bridge in 1888 and 1889 and the Hudson River Tunnel from 1889 to 1891. He consulted on projects including the New Croton Aqueduct and designed the locks on the Kanawha Canal. Hutton died on December 11, 1901.

In the 1930s, his daughters sold a selection of his personal letters and diaries and ninety-five drawings of California to the Huntington Library. Papers related to his engineering career are housed in the Division of the History of Technology at the National Museum of American History.

== Publications ==
Hutton published The Washington Bridge Over the Harlem River, at 181st Street, New York City: A description of its construction in 1891.

In 1942, the Huntington Library published Glances at California 1847–1853: Diaries and Letters of William Rich Hutton, Surveyor and California 1847–1852: Drawings by William Rich Hutton.
