= Grace and St. Peter's Church =

Coordinates: 39°17′52″N 76°37′5″W

Grace & St. Peter's Church, Baltimore
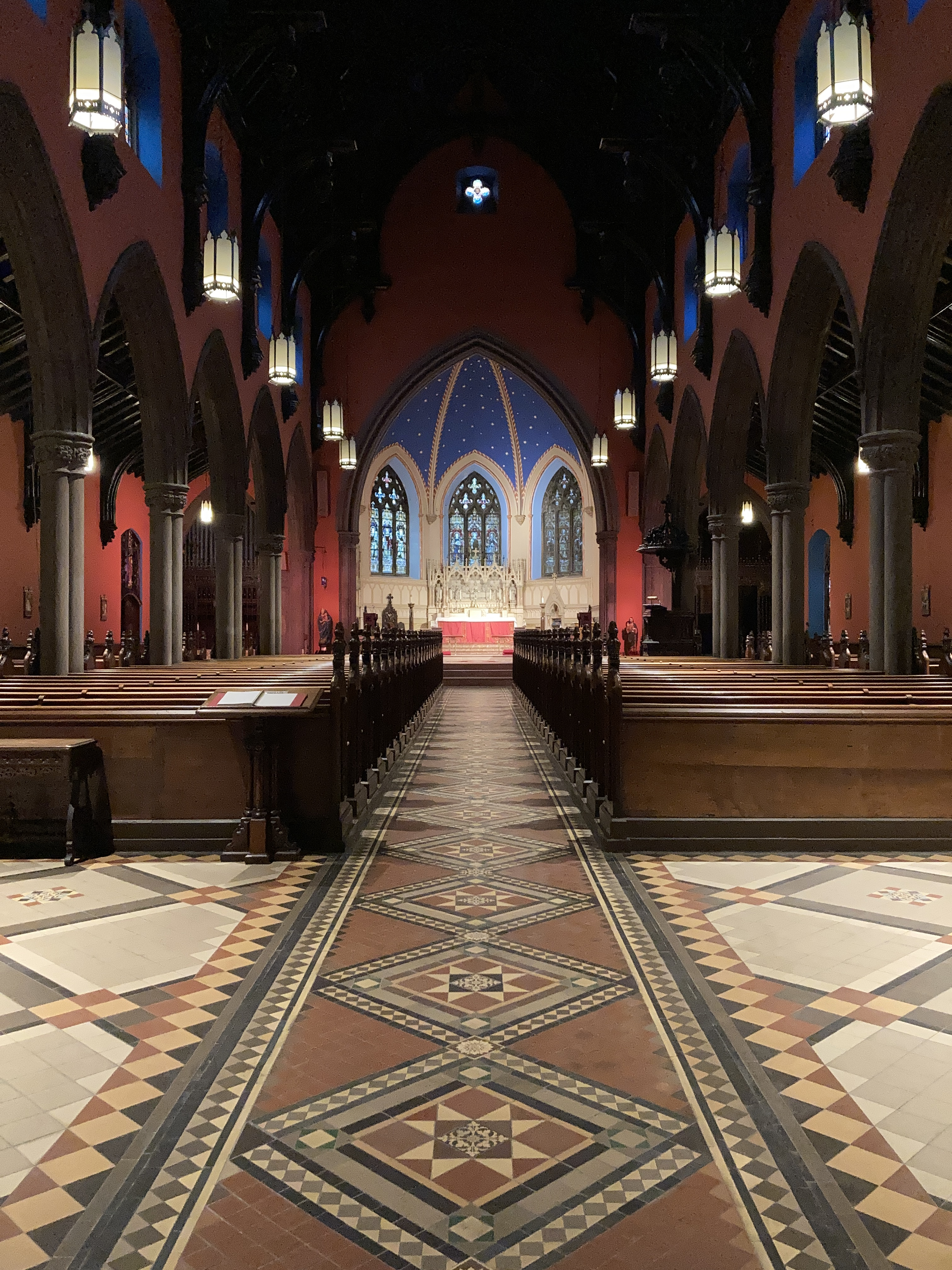
- Grace & St. Peter's Church, Baltimore
- Location: 707 Park Avenue and West Monument Street, Mount Vernon, Baltimore
- Country: United States
- Denomination: Episcopal
- Tradition: Anglican
- Churchmanship: Anglo-Catholic
- Website: https://www.graceandstpeter.org

History
- Founded: 1802 (St. Peter's); 1850 (Grace); 1912 (Grace & St. Peter's)
- Dedication: Our Lady of Grace; Saint Peter
- Consecrated: October 30, 1856

Architecture
- Architects: John Rudolph Niernsee; James Crawford Neilson
- Architectural type: Gothic Revival
- Years built: 1850–1852
- Groundbreaking: July 20, 1850

Specifications
- Capacity: 500
- Length: 160 feet (49 m)
- Width: 70 feet (21 m)

Administration
- Province: Province III
- Diocese: Maryland

Clergy
- Bishop: The Rt. Rev. Eugene Sutton
- Rector: The Rev. Christopher V. Pyles

Grace & St. Peter's Church is an Anglo-Catholic Episcopal parish in the city of Baltimore, in the Episcopal Diocese of Maryland. The congregation is the product of the 1912 amalgamation of two earlier parishes, St. Peter's Church (founded in 1803) and Grace Church (founded in 1850). Its building, constructed in Brownstone, is an elaborate example of English Gothic Revival architecture dating from 1852. Today, Grace & St. Peter's is distinguished by its Anglo-Catholic liturgy and professional choir. From 1940 to 2020, it was also home to the Wilkes School at Grace & St. Peter's, an Episcopal day school which closed in the midst of the COVID-19 pandemic.

The church reported 411 members in 2016 and 416 members in 2023; no membership statistics were reported in 2024 parochial reports. Plate and pledge income reported for the congregation in 2024 was $158,685 with average Sunday attendance (ASA) of 67 persons.

== History ==
=== St. Peter’s Church (1803–1911) ===
Founded in 1802, St. Peter's Church was the second-oldest Episcopal congregation in the city after Old Saint Paul's (1692). The organizing vestry received a charter from the city of Baltimore “to solicit and receive subscriptions and donations, not exceeding twenty-five thousand dollars for the purpose of purchasing a lot of land […] for the building [of] a Protestant Episcopal church, to be called St. Peter’s." The first building, on Sharp and German Streets was consecrated May 27, 1804 by Bishop Claggett, and occupied until June 28, 1868. South Sharp Street (which is now called Hopkins Plaza at that latitude), and German Street (now called Redwood Street) no longer intersect. Most of the original neighborhood was demolished in the nineteenth and twentieth centuries to make way for business districts. (That area is currently occupied by the University of Maryland Medical Center and CFG Bank Arena.)

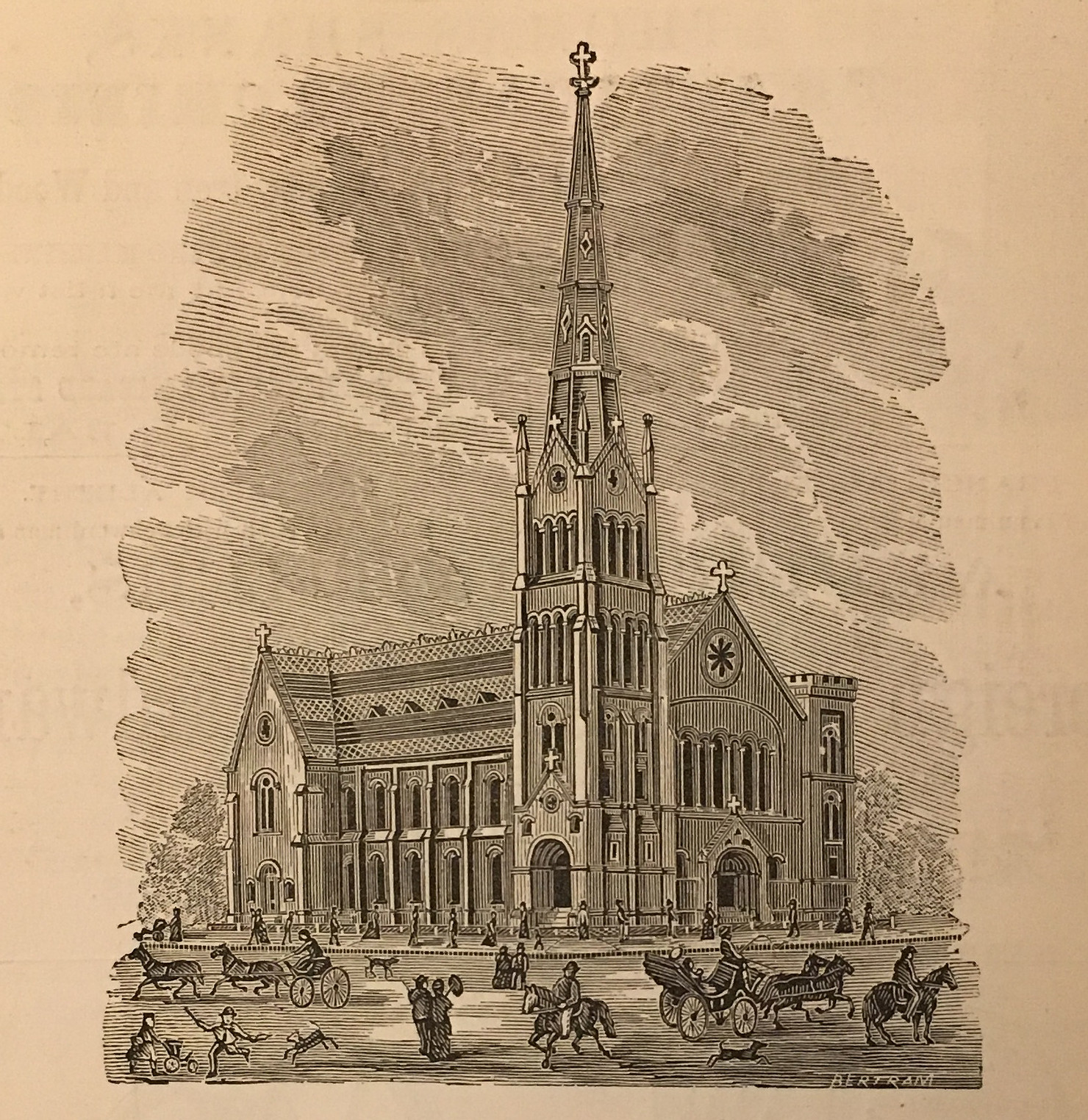
St. Peter's Church, c. 1870

Eventually, with "the Westward growth of the city necessitating the abandonment of the original site," St. Peter's decamped to a temporary home in the New Assembly Rooms and broke ground on a building at the corner of Druid Hill Avenue and Lanvale Street on September 15, 1868. The church was designed in the style of the "Norman period of English Gothic" by Nathaniel Henry Hutton and John Murdoch. The cornerstone was laid on April 29, 1869, and the church was opened in October 1870.

St. Peter's was founded by congregants of Old Saint Paul's, who brought with them a distinctly Low Church, evangelical orientation. One of the first Rectors of St. Peter's, The Rev. George Dashiell (1780–1852) would actually attempt to establish his own "Evangelical Episcopal Church," in protest against the consecration of James Kemp as Bishop Suffragan of Maryland. Dashiell was deposed on December 8, 1815, as a result. More than a half-century later, another former Rector of St. Peter's would defect, largely in protest against Ritualism and emerging Anglo-Catholic tendencies in the Church: in 1873, The Rt. Rev. George David Cummins, then Assistant Bishop of Kentucky, resigned his call to found the Reformed Episcopal Church.

Despite the political tensions in the wake of the Civil War, as well as the changing nature of the congregation's Churchmanship, St. Peter's remained an active force in the surrounding areas of Reservoir Hill, Bolton Hill (also served by Memorial Episcopal), Madison Park, and Upton from 1870 to 1911. In 1910, however, Baltimore enacted the first set of Residential Segregation Ordinances in the United States. Couched in the melioristic language of the Progressive Era, the ordinances' purported aim was "preserving peace, preventing conflict and ill feeling" between races, and "promoting the general welfare of the city." The blunt effect, however, was a severe, physical inscription of racial segregation on Baltimore's landscape.

St. Peter's lay on a dividing line between an affluent, white neighborhood and––to the west––a neighborhood with a burgeoning African American middle class. Apparently rejecting Bishop Paret's entreaty to stay, the congregation sold their building to Bethel African Methodist Episcopal Church and began searching for a new site. Unable to find one, the congregation merged with Grace Church the next year. Bethel A.M.E. Church continues to worship in the building at Druid Hill Avenue and Lanvale Street to the present day.

=== Grace Church (1850–1911) ===
Grace Church began its ministry as a mission parish of St. Peter's, at the encouragement of Bishop Whittingham. Organized on February 15 and incorporated on May 30, 1850, the new Grace Church was designed by John Rudolph Niernsee and James Crawford Neilson, and situated at the corner of West Monument Street and Park Avenue. On July 20, 1850, The Rev. Thomas Atkinson, Rector of St. Peter's laid the cornerstone of the new church. Atkinson left St. Peter's to take charge of Grace Church, but within a year was elected Bishop of North Carolina. Atkinson was succeeded by The Rev. Arthur Cleveland Coxe (later Bishop of Western New York). Educated at the General Theological Seminary, Coxe brought High church sympathies to Grace and inaugurated a trend toward Anglo-Catholicism that continues in the parish today.

Nearly a decade long, Coxe's incumbency (1854–1863) was successful but still marked by internal divisions and controversy: during the American Civil War, Grace Church, like many white Maryland parishes, had divided loyalties. Tensions were especially high during the Union occupation of the city, and in one – possibly apocryphal – incident, a "prominent society woman [...] haughtily and publicly rebuked an usher for 'daring to seat' a Federal officer in her pew" at Grace.

In the years after the Civil War, Grace Church became instrumental in a variety of charitable foundations in the city, including the Church Home and Hospital, the Deaf-Mute Mission, and the "Church of the Advent" in Federal Hill in South Baltimore.

=== Grace & St. Peter's Church (1912–present) ===
In 1912, the two congregations merged, making the 1850 Grace Church (at West Monument Street and Park Avenue) their permanent home. The Rev. Arthur Chilton Powell of Grace and The Rev. Romilly F. Humphries of St. Peter's served as co-Rectors of the new parish until Powell retired in 1913. Humphries, who later oversaw the work of the Episcopal Mission in schools, hospitals, and prisons, is probably responsible for a reinvigoration in outreach and social good programs in the church at that time. In 1919 he left for the Cathedral of the Incarnation as the Diocese's new Archdeacon. On Ash Wednesday 1932, Humphries suffered a heart attack while in the pulpit. Though the attack would later kill him, he still rose to finish his sermon.

Grace & St. Peter's grew significantly in the 1920s, reaching some 1700 communicants. Under the rectorship of The Rev. H. P. Almon Abbott significant additions were made to the church and parish house, including a new Austin organ. Abbott also developed a Church School for the Chinese community in the congregation. In 1929, Abbott was elected Bishop of Kentucky.

The mid-twentieth century was a period of significant change within the congregation. The incumbency of The Rev. Robert Chalmers coincided with the Great Depression and some considerable financial difficulties for the church. After his death, these practical concerns – along with more theological tensions – resulted in a fraught search process for a new Rector. The Rev. Reginald Mallett (1936–1944) and his successor, The Rev. Daniel Corrigan (1944–1948) practically settled any remaining disputes over Churchmanship, firmly establishing the church as an Anglo-Catholic center. Both men would leave Grace & St. Peter's to take up Bishoprics.

Under The Rev. Rex Bozarth Wilkes (1949–1974), the congregation became steadily more diverse (with a new influx of African-American and Chinese families), and the church developed an active community ministry in Mount Vernon. Wilkes also formally established the Grace & St. Peter's School, which was later renamed in his honor. The school – first organized in 1940 – was racially integrated from its inception when many other parochial schools in Baltimore were not. It closed June 30, 2020, during the COVID-19 pandemic. Wilkes was succeeded by The Rev. Edward Palmer Rementer (1975–1987) and then The Rev. Frederick Shepherd Thomas (1988–2016). The current Rector is The Rev. Christopher V. Pyles, who trained for ministry at the General Theological Seminary.

== Architecture ==
The original St. Peter's Church, at the intersection of South Sharp Street (now Hopkins Plaza) and German Street (now Redwood Street), was deconsecrated and vacated by the congregation on June 28, 1868. It was eventually demolished by subsequent ownership. The second St. Peter's Church was constructed at the intersection of Druid Hill Avenue and Lanvale Street by the architects Nathaniel Henry Hutton and John Murdoch. That building was purchased by Bethel African Methodist Episcopal Church in 1911, which continues to worship there to the present day. (Most – if not all – of the stained glass windows in that space are modern additions, unique to its current congregation).

Grace Church only ever occupied a single edifice, the current Grace & St. Peter's Church at the intersection of West Monument Street and Park Avenue. This building was designed by John Rudolph Niernsee and James Crawford Neilson, and constructed between 1850 and 1852. The building was consecrated on October 30, 1856.

The building is an example of Victorian Gothic Revival architecture, which has been substantially altered and embellished over the years to suit increasingly Anglo-Catholic tastes. The church shares many similar architectural features with contemporaneous Episcopal churches in the United States, including St. Mark's Church in Philadelphia (1847–1849). Its arches, aisles, and clerestories bear some similarity to those in the Church of St Barnabas, Pimlico (1847–1850), and St. Saviour's, Pimlico (1863–1864), both in the City of Westminster, London. Elements of the chancel, particularly the reredos, wall carvings and constructed marble credence table, bear striking resemblance to those in St Augustine's Church, Edgbaston in Birmingham.

The high altar was erected in 1898 to a design by Henry Martyn Congdon. The reredos is a depiction of the Last Supper, flanked by John the Baptist and Luke the Evangelist. The three panels on the front of the altar depict the "Sacrifice of Noah, Melchizedek, and Abraham, and Sacrifice of Isaac." Its cost in 1898 was $9000.

Grace & St. Peter's was significantly altered in the 1920s by the Boston-based architect Woldemar H. Ritter (1880–c.1935; son of Karl Wilhelm Ritter). Ritter added a sacristy, constructed the Lady chapel, and designed its altarpiece, as well as other associated grillwork. Ritter was particularly active in Baltimore Episcopal churches, constructing the "Christmas Tower," church hall, sacristy, and altar at Emmanuel Episcopal Church, as well as the altar in the Chapel of Remembrance at St. Michael and All Angels.

There are also several statues and shrines in the church, many of which are twentieth-century additions. These include a shrine to the Virgin Mary, a shrine to Saint Peter and one to King Charles the Martyr at the rear of the east aisle. The 1894 baptismal font – a large marble angel holding a shell – is signed by the noted Scottish stonemason, Andrew Davidson (1841–1925) of D. & A. Davidson, Academy Street, Inverness. (Davidson was also responsible for the Flora MacDonald monument at Inverness Castle, among other works.)

It is unclear if Davidson was the designer of the sculpture or only its executor. It has also been attributed – possibly erroneously – to the Danish sculptor Bertel Thorvaldsen (1770–1844). While the sculpture is similar to Thorvaldsen's font at the Church of Our Lady, Copenhagen, it is almost identical to the font at St. Bartholomew's Church, New York, carved by James Redfern (1838–1876). (A similar font also exists in the baptistery of Emmanuel Episcopal Church).

== Liturgy and music ==
=== Liturgy ===
Since the 1930s, Grace & St. Peter's Church has had a distinctly Anglo-Catholic orientation in worship. The church continues to use the Hymnal 1940 as opposed to the now more common Hymnal 1982. For many years after the authorization of The Book of Common Prayer (1979), Grace & St. Peter's also continued to use the previous 1928 revision (not to be confused with the proposed – but unratified – Book of Common Prayer (1928) in the Church of England). In recent years, the church has varyingly used The Anglican Service Book and several versions of The English Missal and The Anglican Missal in the American Edition.

The church celebrates Solemn High Mass on Sundays and Feast Days as well as a Low Mass on Tuesdays and Wednesdays (choosing this more Catholic language, as opposed to the more Protestant Episcopal designations of "Holy Eucharist" or "The Office of Holy Communion" that appear in the Book of Common Prayer). Services often involve incense, both a Deacon and Subdeacon, as well as a Master of Ceremonies, servers, and a vested choir. Services often end with the Last Gospel and the Angelus, sung to a tone from St Mary's, Bourne Street.

The Blessed Sacrament is reserved in the Lady Chapel.

=== Patronage ===
Grace & St. Peter's claims the patronage of both Saint Peter and Our Lady of Grace, one of the titles of Mary. The Marian association of "Grace" appears to be a mid-twentieth-century innovation, dating from the arrival of a new shrine to the Virgin Mary around 1940. Given its evangelical roots, it is very unlikely that the church was founded with this understanding. Like many other Episcopal churches of the same name, the original Grace Church undoubtedly understood "Grace" in the more abstract sense ("The grace of the Lord Jesus Christ," (2 Corinthians 13:14)).

=== Music ===
At various periods in its history, Grace & St. Peter's had a professional Choir of Men and Boys, with the choristers drawn from the church's school. The church now has a mixed, professional octet. There are two organs in the sanctuary, a large 1922 Austin in the chancel, and a modern M. P. Moller at the rear of the nave (dedicated in 2007). Previous instruments in the space were built by E. and G. G. Hook & Hastings (1856) and Roosevelt Organ Works (1886). The historic Austin pipe organ (1922) was played in recital during the Organ Historical Society Convention in July 2024.

== Cantonese Community ==
In the 1920s, Grace & St. Peter's grew and expanded in a variety of ways. Along with the construction of the sacristy, the Resurrection Chapel, the Lady Chapel, the reordering of the chancel and sanctuary, and the installation of the Austin organ, some women of the parish – the Marshall sisters – identified the need for the church to be of service to the growing community of Cantonese immigrants living and working in Baltimore's Chinatown, a few blocks south of the church on Park Avenue. The sisters organized an English language school for immigrants and their children, which ran successfully for two decades, even after the sisters died. However, by the 1940s, some members of the Cantonese community wanted their American-born children to retain a linguistic link to their ancestral homeland. So, Grace & St. Peter's began to offer Cantonese-language classes to support this. Ultimately, many Cantonese participants in the language schools became members of Grace & St. Peter's, and the success of the school paved the way for the opening of the Grace & St. Peter's School in 1940. Originally only a preschool, after the arrival of Fr. Wilkes in 1949, the school added a year of students each year, and by the mid-1950s, offered pre-Kindergarten through grade 6.

Meanwhile, Chinese membership at the church was so robust that a Cantonese-language Mass was added on Sunday afternoons, complete with choir and organ music. This service continued through the late 1980s. Responsible for translating various parts of the liturgy were Mr. John Chin and Mrs. Lillian Kim, the latter of whom worked for Baltimore Mayor (and later Governor of Maryland) William Donald Schaefer. Mrs. Kim was also responsible for the church-sponsored Chinese New Year festivities and parade that took place on Park Avenue in front of Grace & St. Peter's each winter. Although the church no longer observes Chinese New Year with a parade, it does observe it liturgically with scripture readings and hymns in Cantonese. In the early twenty-first century, about one-third of the congregation at Grace and St. Peter's claims Chinese ancestry.

== Previous rectors ==
St. Peter's Church (1803) and Grace Church (1850) were served by different Rectors for most of their histories until the 1912 amalgamation. However, as Grace Church was founded as a mission parish of St. Peter's there was a periodic exchange of clergy between the two parishes. Grace & St. Peter's and its two preceding foundations have produced seven Bishops in the Episcopal Church.

=== St. Peter's Church (1803–1911) ===
Partial list:

- 1803–1815 (?): The Rev. George Dashiell
- 1817–1843: The Rt. Rev. John Prentiss Kewley Henshaw, D.D. (Later Bishop of Rhode Island)
- 1843–1852: The Rt. Rev. Thomas Atkinson, D.D., LL.D (Later Bishop of North Carolina)
- 1853–1858: The Rev. James H. Morrison, D.D.
- 1858–1863: The Rt. Rev. George David Cummins, D.D. (Later Assistant Bishop of Kentucky)
- 1864–1892: The Rev. Julius E. Grammar, D.D.
- 1906–1912: The Rev. Romilly F. Humphries, D.D.

=== Grace Church (1850–1911) ===
Partial list:

- 1852–1853: The Rt. Rev. Thomas Atkinson, D.D., LL.D (Later Bishop of North Carolina)
- 1854–1863: The Rt. Rev. Arthur Cleveland Coxe, D.D. (Later Bishop of Western New York)
- 1866–1885: The Rev. George Leeds, D.D.
- 1885–1888: The Rt. Rev. Chauncey B. Brewster (Later Bishop of Connecticut)
- 1888–1912: The Rev. Arthur Chilton Powell, D.D.

=== Grace & St. Peter's Church (1912–present) ===
- 1912–1913: The Rev. Arthur Chilton Powell, D.D. (Associate Rector)
- 1912–1913: The Rev. Romilly F. Humphries, D.D. (Associate Rector)
- 1913–1919: The Rev. Romilly F. Humphries, D.D. (Rector)
- 1919–1928: The Rt. Rev. Henry P. Almon Abbott, D.D. (Later Bishop of Lexington, KY)
- 1930–1935: The Rev. Robert Scott Chalmers, D.D.
- 1936–1944: The Rt. Rev. Reginald Mallett, D.D. (Later Bishop of Northern Indiana)
- 1944–1948: The Rt. Rev. Daniel Corrigan, D.D. (Later Bishop Suffragan of Colorado)
- 1949–1974: The Rev. Rex Bozarth Wilkes, D.D.
- 1975–1987: The Rev. Edward P. Rementer (Assistant Rector, 1966–68; Associate Rector, 1968–75)
- 1988–2016: The Rev. Frederick S. Thomas (Assistant Rector, 1977–86; Rector-Elect, 1987)
- 2017–present: The Rev. Christopher V. Pyles (Rector)
