= Karl Ritter =

Karl Ritter may refer to:

- Karl Ritter (diplomat) (1883–1968), German diplomat
- Karl Ritter (director) (1888–1977), German film producer and director
- Carl Ritter (1779–1859), German geographer
- Karl Wilhelm Ritter (1847–1906), civil engineer and rector of the Polytechnic Institute of Zurich
