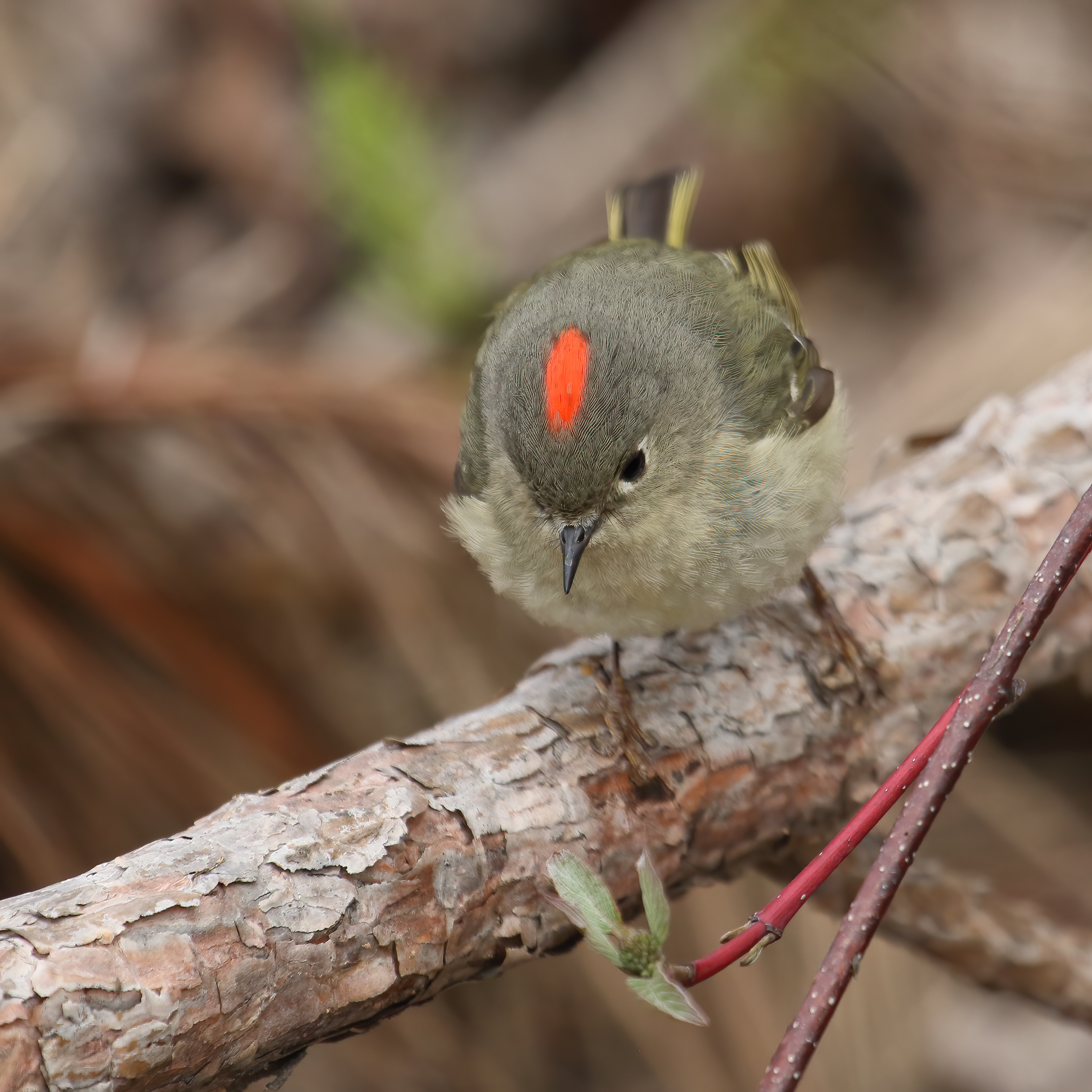
- Male in Réserve naturelle du Marais-Léon-Provancher, Québec, Canada
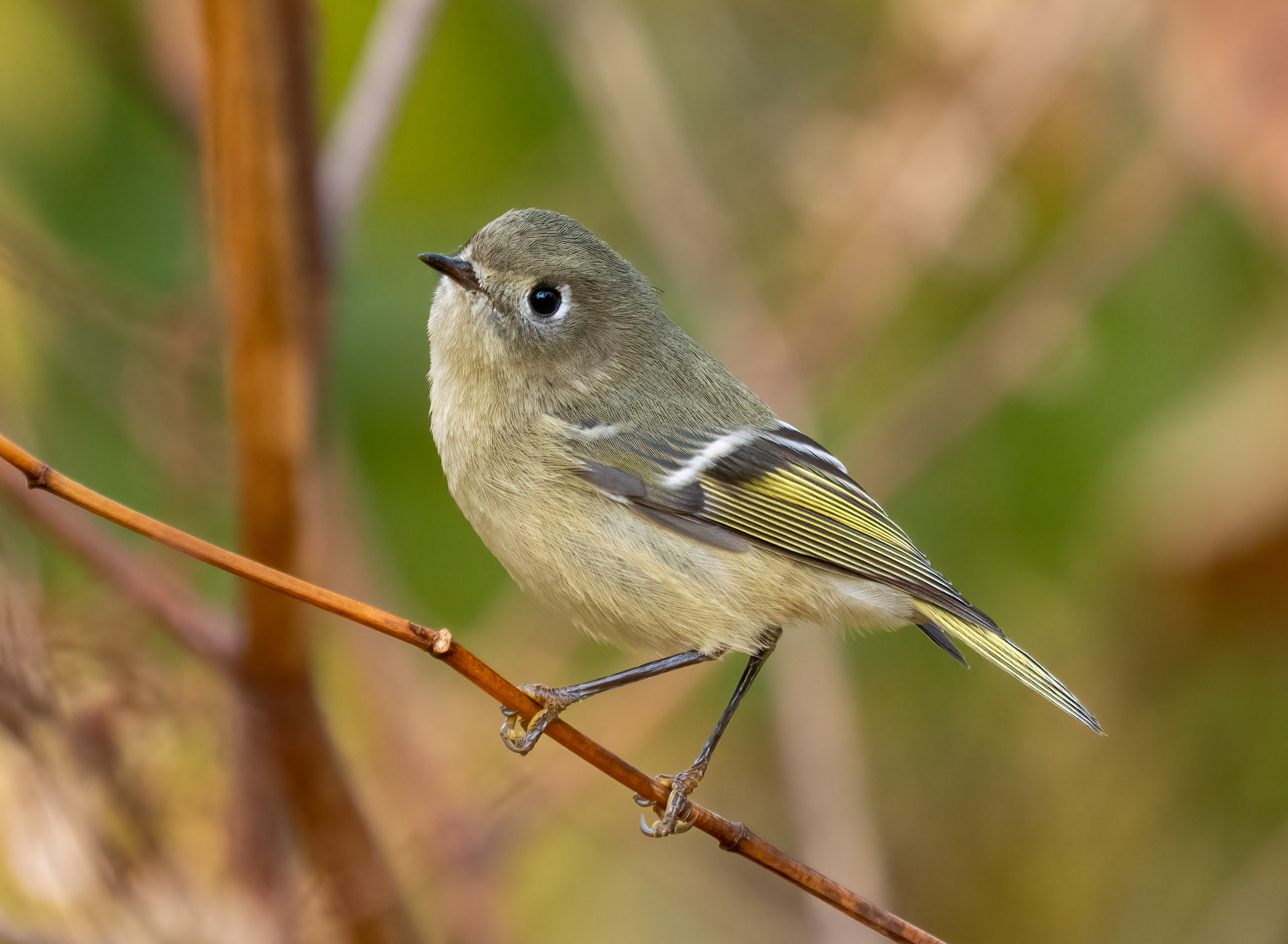
- Adult in New York, USA

Conservation status
- Least Concern (IUCN 3.1)

Scientific classification
- Kingdom: Animalia
- Phylum: Chordata
- Class: Aves
- Order: Passeriformes
- Family: Regulidae
- Genus: Corthylio; Cabanis, 1853
- Species: C. calendula

Binomial name
- Corthylio calendula (Linnaeus, 1766)
- Range of C. calendula Year round Summer (breeding) Winter (nonbreeding) Migration (ranges are approximate)

Synonyms
- Regulus calendula Linnaeus, 1766

= Ruby-crowned kinglet =

Species of bird

The ruby-crowned kinglet (Corthylio calendula) is a very small passerine bird found throughout North America. It is a member of the kinglet family. The bird has olive-green plumage with two white wing bars and a white eye-ring. Males have a red crown patch, which is often concealed. The sexes are identical apart from the crown, and juveniles are similar in plumage to adult females. It is one of the smallest songbirds in North America. The ruby-crowned kinglet is not closely related to other kinglets and was moved from Regulus to its own genus, Corthylio, in 2021. Three subspecies are currently recognized.

The kinglet is mostly migratory, and its range extends from northwest Canada and Alaska south to Mexico. Its breeding habitat is spruce-fir forests in the northern and mountainous regions of the United States and Canada. The ruby-crowned kinglet builds a cup-shaped nest, which may be pensile or placed on a tree branch and is often hidden. It lays up to 12 eggs, and has the largest clutch of any North American passerine for its size. It is mainly insectivorous, but also eats fruits and seeds.

== Taxonomy ==
The ruby-crowned kinglet was formally described in 1766 by the Swedish naturalist Carl Linnaeus in the twelfth edition of his Systema Naturae under the binomial name Motacilla calendula. Linnaeus based his description on "The Ruby-crowned wren" that had been described and illustrated in 1758 by English naturalist George Edwards in his Gleanings of Natural History. Edwards had received dried specimens sent by the American naturalist William Bartram from Pennsylvania. The French zoologist Mathurin Jacques Brisson in 1760 had also published a description based on Edwards and had coined the Latin name Calendula Pensilvanica. Although Brisson coined Latin names, these do not conform to the binomial system and are not recognised by the International Commission on Zoological Nomenclature. Linnaeus specified the locality as Pennsylvania but this is now restricted to Philadelphia.

The kinglets are a small group of birds formerly included in the Old World warblers, but now given family status, especially as recent research showed that, despite superficial similarities, the crests are taxonomically remote from the warblers.

The ruby-crowned kinglet was formerly placed in the genus Regulus. As a result of its larger size, strongly red (rather than orange or yellow) crest and lack of black crown stripes, as well as its distinctive vocalizations, the ruby-crowned kinglet is considered different enough from the Old World kinglets and the other American species, the golden-crowned kinglet, to be assigned to a separate genus, Corthylio, that was introduced in 1853 by the German ornithologist Jean Cabanis. The genus name is from the Ancient Greek korthúlos, a small wren-like bird mentioned by the Greek lexicographer Hesychius of Alexandria. Phylogenetic evidence indicates that the ruby-crowned kinglet's lineage diverged from the rest of Regulus during the mid- to late Miocene, about 10–15 million years ago.

Up to five subspecies have been described, but "C. c. cineraceus", breeding in montane western North America, and "C. c. arizonensis", breeding in Arizona, are considered to be clinal variants of the nominate subspecies.

The three subspecies are:

- C. c. grinnellii (Palmer, W, 1897) – Breeds in southeast Alaska (described from Sitka, Alaska), southwestern Canada and northwestern U.S., in coastal temperate rainforest. Resident or only a short-distant migrant wintering in western U.S. Darker, and shorter-winged than C. c. calendula.
- C. c. calendula (Linnaeus, 1766) – Breeds in central, eastern Canada and southwestern, west-central, eastern U.S. Winters in northern Central America
- C. c. obscurus (Ridgway, 1876) – Endemic on Guadalupe Island off the coast of northwestern Mexico. Darker, with a larger bill, and shorter wings and tail than C. c. calendula. Considered extinct; last documented sighting occurred in 1953.

== Description ==
The ruby-crowned kinglet is a very small bird, being 9 to 11 cm (3.5 to 4.3 in) long, having a wingspan of 16 to 18 cm (6.3 to 7.1 in), and weighing 5 to 10 g (0.2 to 0.4 oz). It has gray-green upperparts and olive-buff underparts. It has two white wingbars and a broken white eye ring. The wingbar on the greater secondary coverts (closer to the wing-tip) is wider, and is next to a dark band. The kinglet has a relatively plain face and head, although the male has a scarlet-red crown patch, which is usually concealed by the surrounding feathers. The crown patch is rarely orange, yellow, or not present. Females are identical to males (except for the crown). Immature birds are similar to adult females, since young males lack a crown patch. The kinglet usually moves along branches or through foliage with short hops, and flies with bursts of rapid wing beats. It is constantly active, and is easily recognized by its characteristic wing-flicking. Its flight has been described as "swift, jerky, and erratic".

Compared to the related golden-crowned kinglet, the ruby-crowned kinglet is slightly larger, more elongated, and has greener plumage. The bird can be mistaken for Hutton's vireo, which also displays wing-flicking, though less frequently than the kinglet. It can also be mistaken for the dwarf vireo in Mexico. However, both of the vireos are larger, have stouter bills and legs, and lack the kinglet's black bar on the wings.

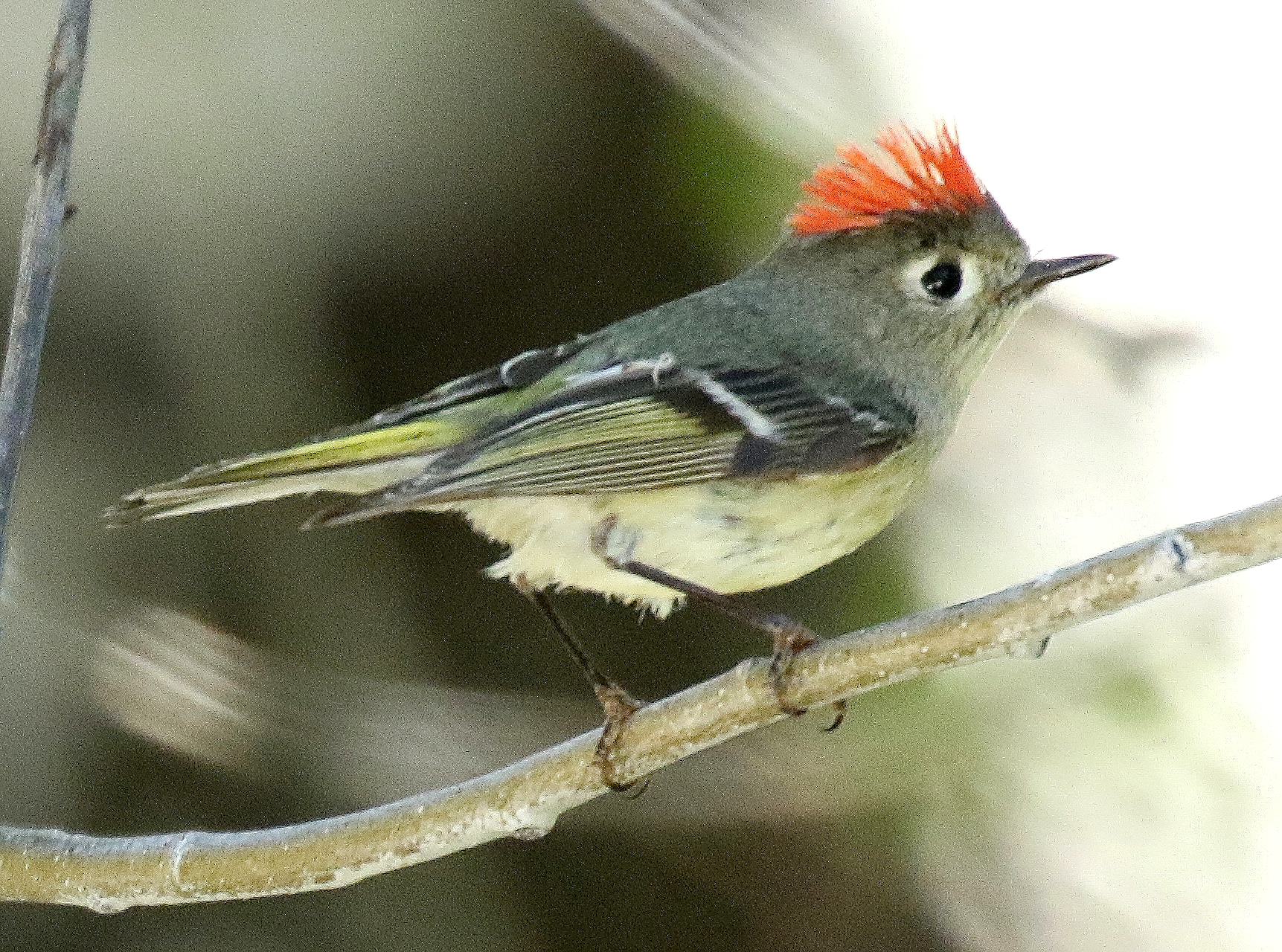
Rare flashing of ruby crest

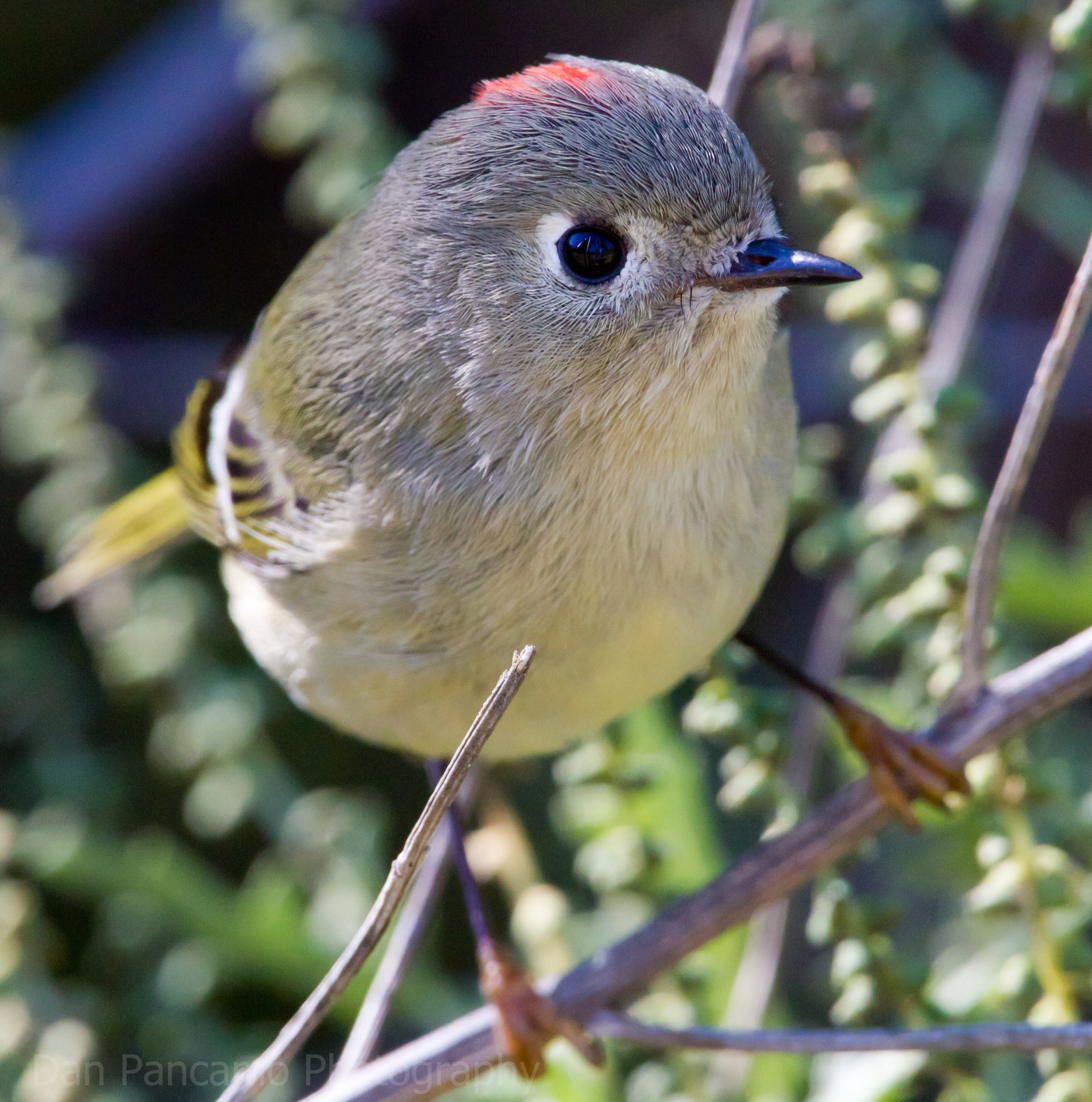
Close-up on head

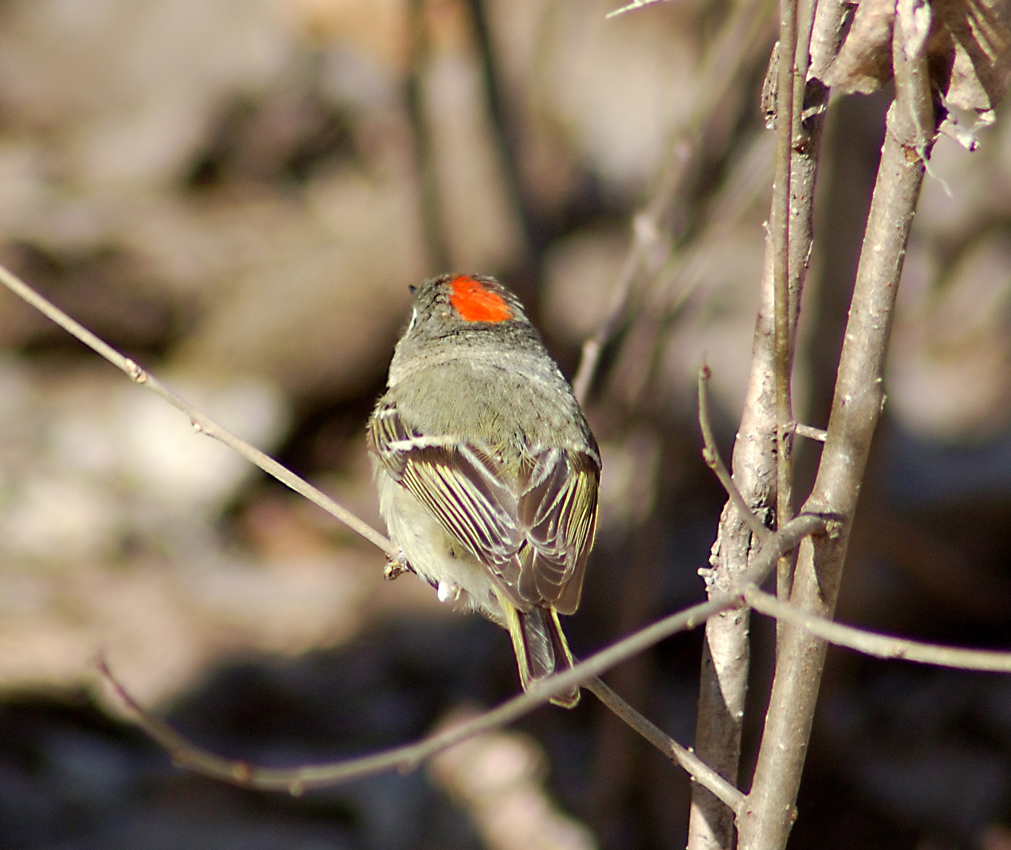
Reverse view of male, showing the red crown

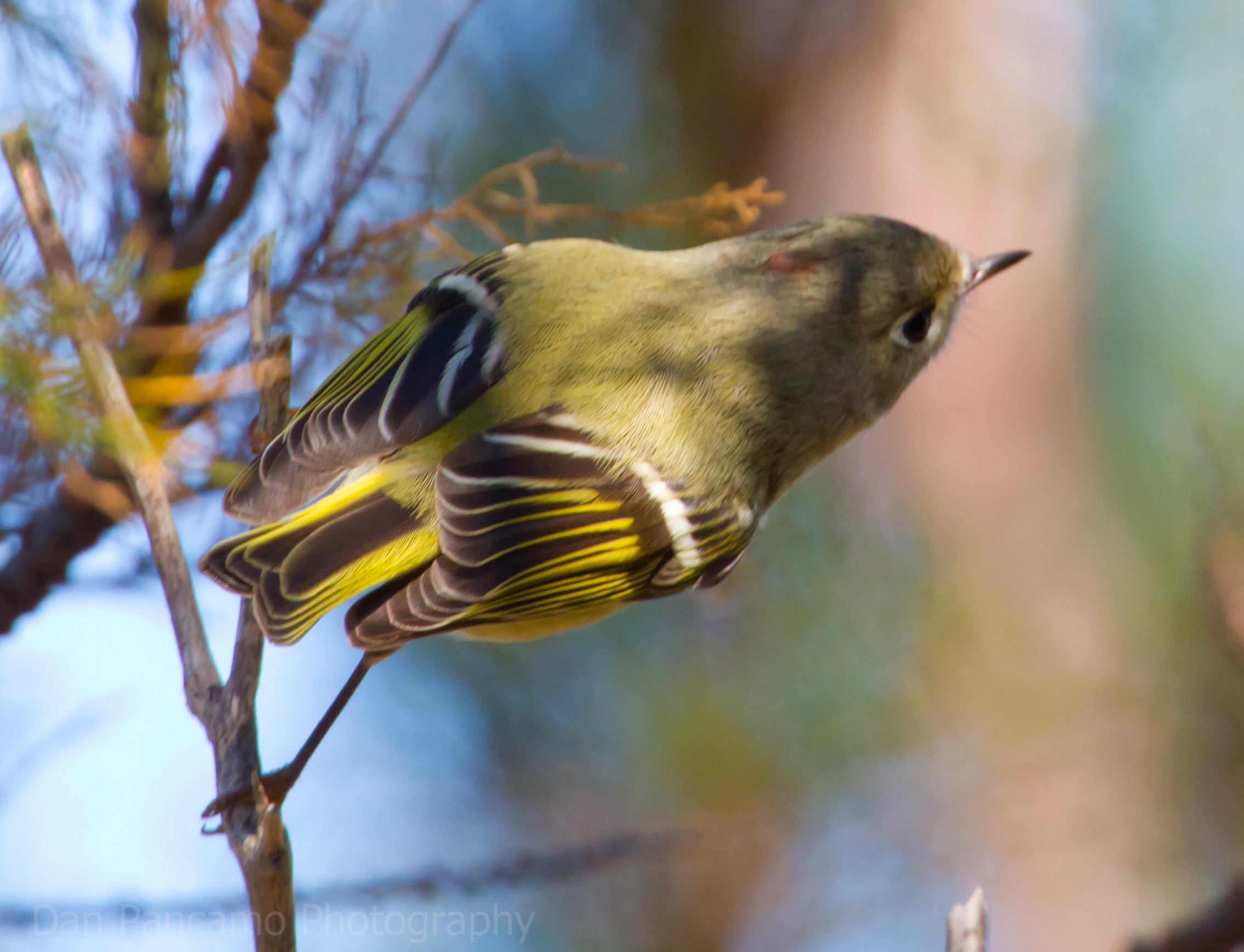
Tail plumage

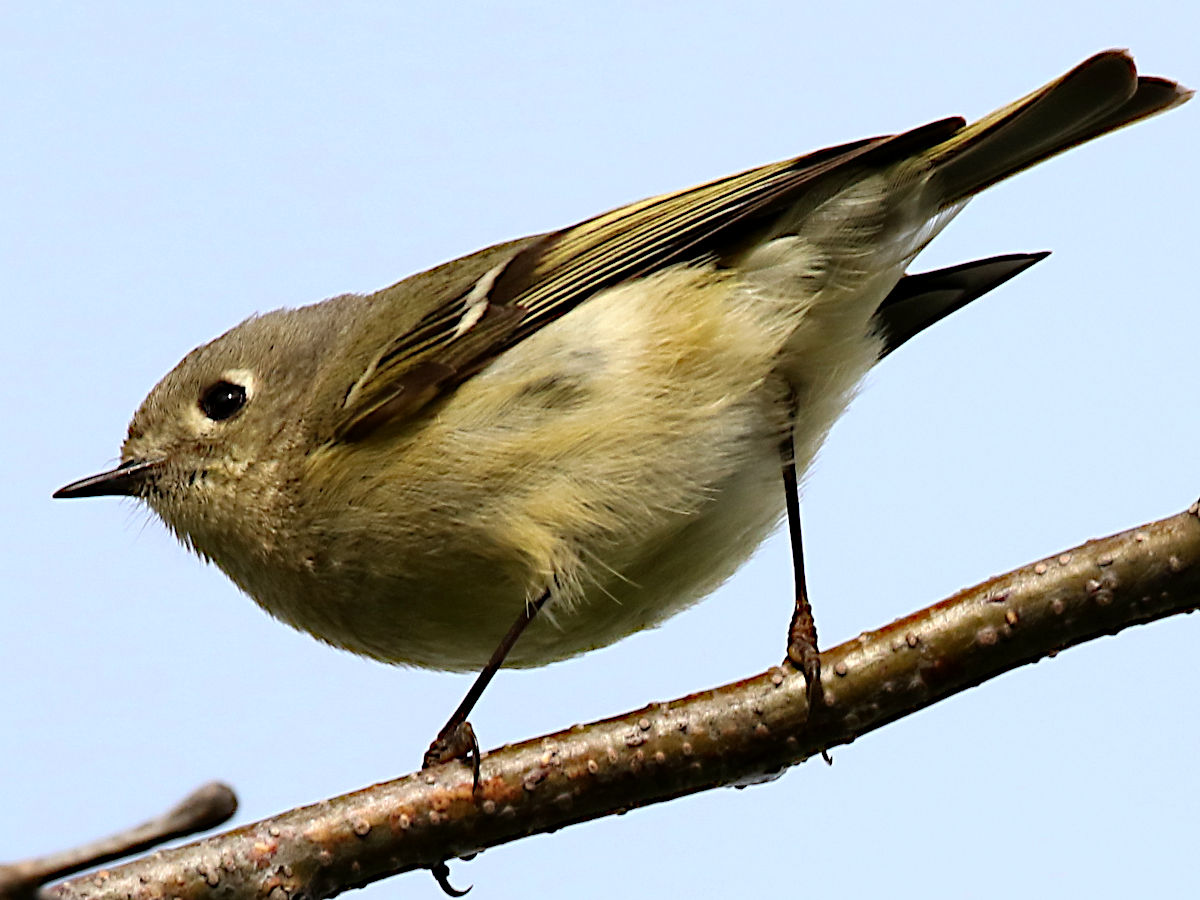
Underparts

=== Vocalization ===
The ruby-crowned kinglet's vocalizations are remarkably loud and complex for its size. Its song can be divided into three main parts: a series of high pitched notes (zee-zee-zee or tee-tee-tee), two to five low trills (turr or tu), and a repeated three note "galloping" phrase (tee-da-leet, tee-da-leet). However, there is variation in the songs of a given individual, and they often contain only one or two of the three parts. The third part is only sung by male birds; an abbreviated version is heard from the females. Other vocalizations of the ruby-crowned kinglet include alarm calls, simple contact calls, and begging calls produced by chicks.

== Distribution and habitat ==
Their breeding habitat is coniferous forests across Canada, Alaska, northern New England and the western United States. They nest in a well-concealed hanging cup made of downy plant material and feathers suspended from a conifer branch and may lay as many as twelve eggs in a clutch.

Recent counts from Breeding Bird Surveys indicate that the ruby-crowned kinglet population is on the rise. This is mainly due to discovery of less disturbed territory farther north. This allows more successful breeding.

The nominate subspecies, C. c. calendula, breeds from northwestern Alaska across Canada, all the way to the maritime provinces. It can also be found in the breeding season across the northern tier of the United States and along southerly spurs at altitude in the Rocky Mountains and Sierra Nevada.

The subspecies C. c. grinnellii, breeding from southeastern Alaska to British Columbia differs significantly from C. c. calendula: it is smaller and shorter-winged, its upperparts are darker and greener, its underparts are buffy rather than grayish-olive, and the vent is tinged yellow rather than dull whitish-olive.

The subspecies C. c. obscurus, from Guadalupe Island, off Baja California, was last sighted in 1953 and is considered extinct.

Hybridization with golden-crowned kinglets has been reported to have possibly occurred.

== Behaviour ==
Ruby-crowned kinglets forage actively in trees or shrubs, mainly eating small insects and spiders, some berries and tree sap. They may hover over a branch while feeding and sometimes fly out to catch insects in flight. The red crest is raised when agitated or in display. Often, they perform a "broken-wing" act to draw predators away from their nest, which they will defend fearlessly, mobbing the intruder which may be a cat, squirrel, or human.
