= James D. Hutton =

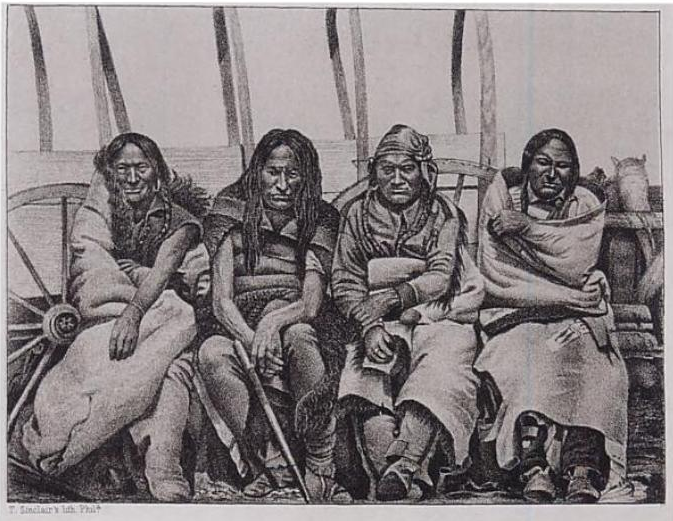
"Principal Chiefs of the Arapaho Tribe," engraving after a photograph by James D. Hutton c. 1860

James Dempsey Hutton (c. 1828–1868) was an artist, surveyor, cartographer and early photographer active in Montana, Wyoming, South Dakota and North Dakota in the years before the American Civil War. He served as an engineer in the Confederate States Army in that conflict, and died in exile in Mexico in 1868.

== Early life and California ==
Hutton was the middle son of James Hutton (d. 1843) of Washington, D.C. and his wife, the former Salome Rich, sister of bibliographer Obadiah Rich and botanist and explorer William Rich. His brothers were the artist and civil engineer William Rich Hutton and architect and engineer Nathaniel Henry Hutton. James Hutton and his older brother William traveled to California in 1847 with their uncle William Rich, who had been appointed paymaster with the rank of Major to the US volunteer forces in the Mexican–American War. James was hired to survey San Jose, California in July 1847, but was suspended the following January. He is assumed to have joined his brother and uncle on many of their travels around California in the late 1840s; a number of his sketches survive from this period. He served as county clerk of San Luis Obispo County, where his brother William was surveyor, from 1850 to 1852.

== Raynolds Expedition ==
On April 22, 1859, James Hutton was appointed as topographer at a salary of $120 a month with the Raynolds Expedition led by Captain William F. Raynolds of the Army Corps of Topographical Engineers to explore the northern Rocky Mountains from Fort Pierre in the soon-to-be Dakota Territory to the headwaters of the Yellowstone River. His charter was to report on the climate, natural resources and Native American tribes he found. He was also directed to map wagon roads from Fort Laramie to Fort Union and Fort Benton, and from the Yellowstone River to South Pass on the Oregon Trail and between the headwaters of the Missouri and Wind Rivers. Hutton doubled as an assistant artist and photographer with the expedition, making pen-and-ink sketches and taking photographs of Wyoming's Big Horn and Wind River Mountains and Montana's Yellowstone and Missouri River valleys. He is known to have made ethnographic photographs of members of the Crow, Sioux, Cheyenne, and Arapaho Nations. In 1862, seven engravings after Hutton's photographs of Native Americans were published in "Contributions to the Ethnology and Philology of the Indian Tribes of the Missouri Valley" (Transactions of the American Philosophical Society, Volume 12), by Ferdinand V. Hayden, the expedition's geologist. During July 1859 while on the Raynolds Expedition, Hutton and Zephyr Recontre, the expedition's Sioux interpreter, took a side trip to locate an isolated rock formation that had been seen from great distance in 1857 by a previous expedition. Hutton and Recontre became the first caucasians to reach the rock formation, later known as Devils Tower; Raynolds never elaborated on this event in great detail, mentioning it only in passing.

== Civil War and exile ==
At the outbreak of the Civil War, Hutton was again resident in Washington, D.C., where he worked as a cartographer. Hutton joined the Confederacy early in the war, delivering the Federal plans for the defense of Alexandria, Virginia to the South. He served as an engineer under Generals Henry A. Wise and Sterling Price. His sketch of the Battle of Pilot Knob on September 27, 1864, survives. At the end of the war, he emigrated to Mexico, where he died in 1868.

The Manuscripts Department of the Huntington Library and Art Gallery houses a collection of sixteen of James D. Hutton's drawings.
