= 2 Corinthians 10 =

- ← chapter 9 chapter 11 →
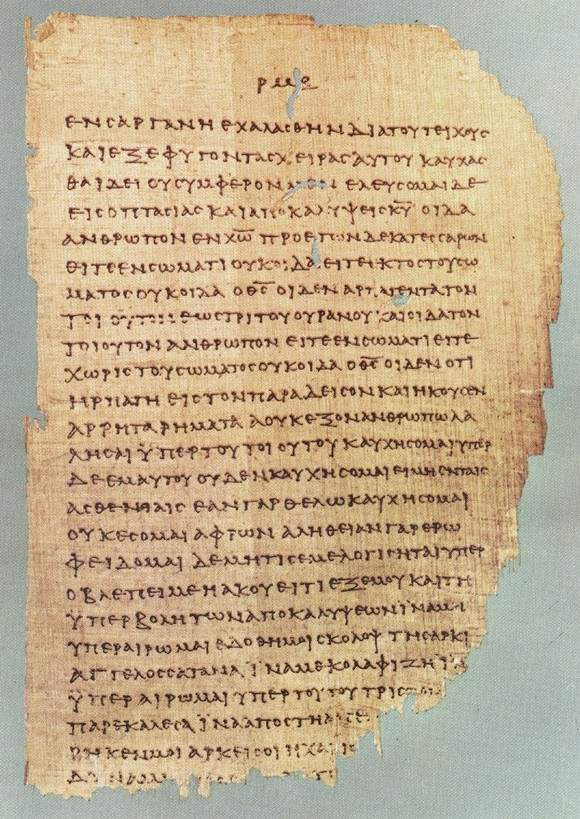
- A folio of Papyrus 46 (written c. AD 200), containing 2 Corinthians 11:33–12:9. This manuscript contains almost complete parts of the whole Pauline epistles.
- Book: Second Epistle to the Corinthians
- Category: Pauline epistles
- Christian Bible part: New Testament
- Order in the Christian part: 8

2 Corinthians 10 is the tenth chapter of the Second Epistle to the Corinthians in the New Testament of the Christian Bible. It was written by Paul the Apostle and Timothy (2 Corinthians 1:1) in Macedonia in 55–56 CE. According to theologian Heinrich August Wilhelm Meyer, chapters 10–13 "contain the third chief section of the Epistle, the apostle's polemic vindication of his apostolic dignity and efficiency, and then the conclusion". According to Margaret MacDonald, they "set the stage" for Paul's forthcoming visit to Corinth. The whole of this third section is based upon the conviction that "the apostle's authority is rooted in the fact that his personal strength/weakness echoes the strength/weakness of the crucified/resurrected Christ".

== Text ==
The original text was written in Koine Greek. This chapter is divided into 18 verses.

=== Textual witnesses ===
Some early manuscripts containing the text of this chapter are:

- Papyrus 46 (~AD 200)
- Codex Vaticanus (325–350)
- Codex Sinaiticus (330–360)
- Codex Alexandrinus (400–440)
- Codex Ephraemi Rescriptus (~450; extant verses 1–7)
- Codex Freerianus (~450; extant verses 1,8–10,17–18)
- Codex Claromontanus (~550).

=== Old Testament references ===
- 2 Corinthians 10:17: Jeremiah 9:24

=== New Testament references ===
- 2 Corinthians 10:17: 1 Corinthians 1:31

== Verse 4 ==
The weapons we fight with are not the weapons of the world. On the contrary, they have divine power to demolish strongholds (New International Version).

The weapons (Biblical Greek: ὅπλα, opla) which Paul refers to are "not carnal", (Biblical Greek: ου σαρκικα, ou sarkika). He does not rely on human power and authority or on learning or eloquence.

== Verse 10 ==
Paul knows that he is criticised for being bold and direct in his writings but treated as weak and unassertive when he is present: he has made the same point in verse 1,

I who am humble when face to face with you, but bold toward you when I am away.

Biblical commentator Edward Plumptre notes also the criticism that Paul's delay in returning to Corinth, which he has explained in 2 Corinthians 2:15–17, was also considered to be "a proof that he was shirking [an] encounter".

== Verse 17 ==
But "he who glories, let him glory in the Lord."

Believers should not glory in themselves or in the outward circumstances of their lives, or their "inward endowments of mind", but rather "in the Lord Jesus Christ, as the author and donor of all gifts, natural and spiritual".

== See also ==
- Macedonia
- Titus
- Related Bible parts: Psalm 34, Psalm 44, Jeremiah 9, 1 Corinthians 1, 2 Corinthians 11

== Sources ==
- MacDonald, Margaret (2007). "66. 2 Corinthians". In Barton, John; Muddiman, John (eds.). The Oxford Bible Commentary (first (paperback) ed.). Oxford University Press. pp. 1134–1151. ISBN 978-0199277186.
