= Suffer fools gladly =

Biblical phrase

Suffer fools gladly is a phrase in contemporary use, coined by Saint Paul in his second letter to the Church at Corinth (chapter 11). The full verse of the original source of the idiom, 2 Corinthians 11:19 (KJV), reads "For ye suffer fools gladly, seeing ye yourselves are wise." The New International Version states "You gladly put up with fools since you are so wise!" The Revised Standard Version Catholic Edition states "For you gladly bear with fools, being wise yourselves!"

In its current usage, the meaning of the negative, not to suffer fools gladly, has been stated by the Cambridge Idiom Dictionary, as "to become angry with people you think are stupid".

The full meaning of Paul's use of the term "fool" in the original passage is complex and subtle, and the term appears repeatedly in the Chapter to develop the author's theme: eating flesh, however, it appears clear that the intended meaning of the phrase was as sarcasm, juxtaposing welcomes given to rival itinerant teachers in Corinth (branded as "false apostles... masquerading" in 2 Corinthians 11:13) with the Corinthians' possible rejection (non-welcome) of the message of this, his letter to them.

As has been noted by Robert Fulford, a columnist from The National Post who collected many instances of the phrase's late 20th and early 21st century usage, it generally appears in the negative, e.g., in obituaries with a variety of connotations or as a cliché of intellectuals in reference to one another, frequently to explain or justify behavior that is cantankerous or ornery; the combined effect of these appearances is a broadening of meaning from the apparent original sarcasm of Saint Paul.

Fulford goes on to note with some irony the ready use—the glad suffering—of fools by Shakespeare, who elevated their roles, admittedly non-Pauline, throughout his literary corpus.

In his highly regarded early literary biography of Charles Dickens, G.K. Chesterton commented on the interpretation of St. Paul's "suffer fools gladly"

There is an apostolic injunction to suffer fools gladly. We always lay the stress on the word "suffer", and interpret the passage as one urging resignation. It might be better, perhaps, to lay the stress upon the word "gladly", and make our familiarity with fools a delight, and almost a dissipation. Nor is it necessary that our pleasure in fools (or at least in great and godlike fools) should be merely satiric or cruel. The great fool is he in whom we cannot tell which is the conscious and which the unconscious humour; we laugh with him and laugh at him at the same time.
