= 2 Corinthians 12 =

- ← chapter 11 chapter 13 →
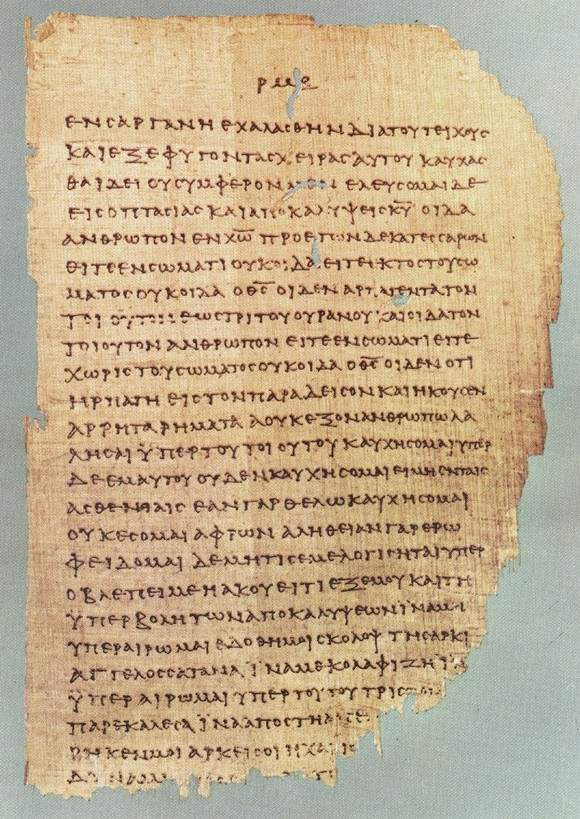
- A folio of Papyrus 46 (written c. AD 200), containing 2 Corinthians 11:33–12:9. This manuscript contains almost complete parts of the whole Pauline epistles.
- Book: Second Epistle to the Corinthians
- Category: Pauline epistles
- Christian Bible part: New Testament
- Order in the Christian part: 8

2 Corinthians 12 is the twelfth chapter of the Second Epistle to the Corinthians in the New Testament of the Christian Bible. It was written by Paul the Apostle and Timothy (2 Corinthians 1:1) in Macedonia in 55–56 CE. Paul continues "speaking like a fool" in this chapter (cf. 2 Corinthians 11:1, 21).

== Text ==
The original text was written in Koine Greek. This chapter is divided into 21 verses.

=== Textual witnesses ===
Some early manuscripts containing the text of this chapter are:

- Papyrus 46 (~AD 200)
- Codex Vaticanus (325–350)
- Codex Sinaiticus (330–360)
- Codex Alexandrinus (400–440)
- Codex Freerianus (~450; extant verses 6–7,14–15)
- Codex Claromontanus (~550).

== Verse 1 ==
It is not expedient for me doubtless to glory. I will come to visions and revelations of the Lord.

Margaret MacDonald notes an impression here that Paul is ready, but reluctant, to move on to a discussion of a final contentious issue, his visions and revelations of (i.e. received from) the LORD.

== Verse 2 ==
I knew a man in Christ above fourteen years ago, (whether in the body, I cannot tell; or whether out of the body, I cannot tell: God knoweth;) such an one caught up to the third heaven.

- John Gill argues that in "I know a man in Christ", Paul refers to himself, as he speaks in the first person in 2 Corinthians 12:7. Paul speaks in the third person to show his humility and modesty. He says himself a "man", not to distinguish from an angel or any other creature; maybe only to express his gender (the Syriac version uses a distinct masculine word) or just to denote a person.
- "Fourteen years ago" could refer either to the time of Paul's conversion or the time of his rapture, which could be in the period of the three days after the conversion, when he was blind, didn't eat nor drink, or many years after the conversion. Most probably, it was not in Damascus, but when Paul was again in Jerusalem, while praying in the temple, and was in a trance (reported in Acts 22:17). Lightfoot places Paul's conversion in 34 AD, the rapture into the third heaven in 43, at the time of the famine during the reign of Claudius (Acts 11:28), when he was in a trance in Jerusalem (Acts 22:17), and the writing of this epistle in 57. Bishop Usher (Note: Gill's spelling of the name of the Archbishop usually called "Ussher") puts the conversion in 35, his rapture in 46, and the writing of this epistle in 60.
- "The third heaven": that is so-called "the seat of the divine Majesty, and the residence of the holy angels", in comparison to the "airy" and "starry" heavens. Paul refers to a distinction in the Jewish belief of "the supreme heaven, the middle heaven, and the lower heaven". (Note: A similar division of worlds differs "the supreme world, and the middle world, and the lower world", and also "the world of angels, the world of the orbs, and the world of them below", or the Cabalists' talk of three worlds, in which "the third world", is "the supreme world, hidden, treasured, and shut up", and is comparable to Paul's "third heaven")
- "Whether in the body, I cannot tell; or whether out of the body, I cannot tell: God knoweth": Either similar to Elijah who was carried with soul and body in a chariot with horses of fire; or as Moses was disembodied for a time, or in a visionary way, as John was "in the Spirit" on the Lord's day (Revelation 1:10), and Ezekiel was taken by a lock of his head, lifted up by the Spirit between earth and heaven, and brought "in the visions of God to Jerusalem", it cannot be ascertained as Paul himself did not know.

== Verse 7 ==
And lest I should be exalted above measure through the abundance of the revelations, there was given to me a thorn in the flesh, the messenger of Satan to buffet me, lest I should be exalted above measure.

== Verse 15 ==
I will most gladly spend and be spent for your souls. If I love you more, am I to be loved less?

Using this verse, the prospect that priests might "spend" or "exhaust" themselves in their ministry was contemplated and commended by the Second Vatican Council in its Decree on the Life and Ministry of Priests:

With a willing heart let them spend and even exhaust themselves in whatever task they are given, even though it be menial and unrecognized.

== See also ==
- Satan
- Third Heaven
- Thorn in the flesh
- Titus
- Related Bible parts: Genesis 1, Hosea 2, Daniel 7, Acts 22, Romans 8, Philippians 4

== Sources ==
- MacDonald, Margaret (2007). "66. 2 Corinthians". In Barton, John; Muddiman, John (eds.). The Oxford Bible Commentary (first (paperback) ed.). Oxford University Press. pp. 1134–1151. ISBN 978-0199277186.
