= Daniel Corrigan =

American Anglican priest

The Right Reverend Daniel Corrigan D.D.
- Suffragan Bishop of Colorado
- Church: Episcopal Church
- Diocese: Colorado
- Elected: February 12, 1958
- In office: 1958–1960
- Successor: Edwin B. Thayer

Orders
- Ordination: May 21, 1925
- Consecration: May 1, 1958 by Henry Knox Sherrill

Personal details
- Born: Daniel Pink; October 25, 1900 Rochester, Minnesota, United States
- Died: September 21, 1994 (aged 93) Santa Barbara, California, United States
- Denomination: Anglican
- Parents: Herbert Pink & Catherine Burns
- Spouse: Miriam Wallace Elizabeth Waters (m. 1926)
- Children: 6
- Education: Nashotah House

Daniel N. Corrigan, born as Daniel Pink (October 25, 1900 – September 21, 1994) was an American prelate of the Episcopal Church, who served as Suffragan bishop of the Episcopal Diocese of Colorado, from 1958 to 1970. He was known for his progressiveness in the Church as well as activism in multiple areas.

== Early life and education ==
Corrigan was born on October 25, 1900, in Rochester, Minnesota, the son of Herbert Pink, an engineer, and Catherine Burns, a professional harpist. He grew up mostly in California and Mexico. He attended the Los Angeles High School, graduating in 1917, and then enlisted in the United States Navy, serving in the submarine service in the North Atlantic during World War I. Upon the end of the war, he joined the United States Merchant Marine. As he had entered the war underage, he had used a different name to serve under. Upon his return to the United States, he married Miriam Wallace, who later died during childbirth. Corrigan had also decided to legally get his name changed to "Daniel Corrigan" after returning home. He then decided to train for the ordained ministry, choosing to study at Nashotah House, from which he graduated with a Bachelor of Divinity in 1925. In 1926, he married Elizabeth Waters. He was awarded an honorary Doctor of Divinity from Nashotah House in 1956.

== Ordained ministry ==
Corrigan was ordained deacon on June 1, 1924, and priest on May 21, 1925. He served as rector of the Church of St John the Baptist in Portage, Wisconsin between 1925 and 1931, rector of Zion Church in Oconomowoc, Wisconsin between 1931 and 1944, rector of Grace and St Peter's Church in Baltimore between 1944 and 1948, and then rector of St Paul's Church in Saint Paul, Minnesota, between 1948 and 1958.

== Bishop ==
On February 12, 1958, Corrigan was elected Bishop of Quincy, and Suffragan Bishop of Colorado, respectively. He decided to accept Colorado, and was consecrated bishop on May 1, 1958, by Presiding Bishop Henry Knox Sherrill. He resigned on June 1, 1960, to serve as Director of the Home Department of the Executive Council of the Episcopal Church. He retained the post till 1968.

== Social issues ==
Corrigan was well known for his civil and human rights and peace efforts. In the 1930s, he worked with the Minnesota Council of Human Relations on behalf of American Indians. He was also an advocate against the Vietnam War. In 1963, he marched with Martin Luther King Jr. in Washington D.C., and sat with him when King delivered the "I Have a Dream" speech. Within the Episcopal Church, he was also one of the first prelates to speak out at the General Convention advocating for gay rights and the ordination of homosexuals, and participated in AIDS ministry in Los Angeles. He is also well known for being one of the three bishops who ordained eleven women to the priesthood on July 29, 1974, two years before the General Convention voted in favor of the ordination of women to the priesthood.
