= Thorn in the flesh =

Biblical phrase

Thorn in the flesh is a phrase of New Testament origin used to describe an annoyance, or trouble in one's life, drawn from Paul the Apostle's use of the phrase in his Second Epistle to the Corinthians.

And lest I should be exalted above measure through the abundance of the revelations, there was given to me a thorn in the flesh, the messenger of Satan to buffet me, lest I should be exalted above measure. ^{8} For this thing I besought the Lord thrice, that it might depart from me. ^{9} And he said unto me, My grace is sufficient for thee: for my strength is made perfect in weakness. Most gladly therefore will I rather glory in my infirmities, that the power of Christ may rest upon me. (2 Corinthians 12:7–9: King James Version).

Other biblical passages where "thorn" is used as a metaphor are:

Know for a certainty that the LORD your God will no more drive out [any of] these nations from before you; but they shall be snares and traps unto you, and scourges in your sides, and thorns in your eyes, until ye perish from off this good land which the LORD your God hath given you.

— Joshua 23:13

And there shall be no more a pricking briar unto the house of Israel, nor [any] grieving thorn of all [that are] round about them, that despised them; and they shall know that I [am] the Lord GOD.

— Ezekiel 28:24

The standard English translation was popularised by the 1611 King James Version of the Bible. Among earlier translations, the 1526 Tyndale Bible uses "vnquyetnes" ("unquietness") rather than "thorn", and the 1557 Geneva Bible refers to a "pricke in the fleshe".

== Biblical meaning ==
Paul mentions what the "thorn in his flesh" was in 2 Corinthians 12:6-7 when he said (Verse 6) "...lest any man should think of me above that which he seeth me to be, or that he heareth of me. (Verse 7) And lest I should be exalted above measure through 'the abundance of revelations', there was given to me 'a thorn in the flesh'..." from "the abundance of revelations" and how people perceived him or "...man should think of me above that which he seeth me to be, or that he heareth of me."

Paul does not specify the nature of his "thorn", and his other epistles do not directly address the topic. Throughout church history, there has been a significant amount of speculation about what Paul was referring to, although scholars such as Philip Edgcumbe Hughes, F. F. Bruce and Ralph P. Martin conclude that definite identification of the thorn is impossible with the evidence available. Other scholars such as B. J. Oropeza, M. David Litwa, and Paula R. Gooder suggest that the thorn refers to the messenger of Satan who harmed Paul during his third heaven experience.

The "thorn" is most commonly interpreted in relation to persecutions or hardships Paul faced.

Other interpretations include:

- Suggestions of "impiety": Easton's Bible Dictionary associates this interpretation with "Roman Catholic writers".
- Paul's agony over Jewish rejection of the gospel
- A reference to Paul's opponents
- A physical ailment
- A temptation to unbelief.

== Modern usage ==
The phrase "thorn in the flesh" continues to be used as a metaphor for "a source of continual annoyance or trouble." It is synonymous with the phrase "thorn in the side", which is also of biblical origin, based on the description in Numbers 33:55. As an example usage, the Oxford English Dictionary cites E. M. Forster's 1924 novel A Passage to India, in which Nawab Bahadur says, "I can be a thorn in Mr. Turton's flesh, and if he asks me I accept the invitation."

== See also ==
- Thorns, spines, and prickles
