= 2 Corinthians 11 =

- ← chapter 10 chapter 12 →
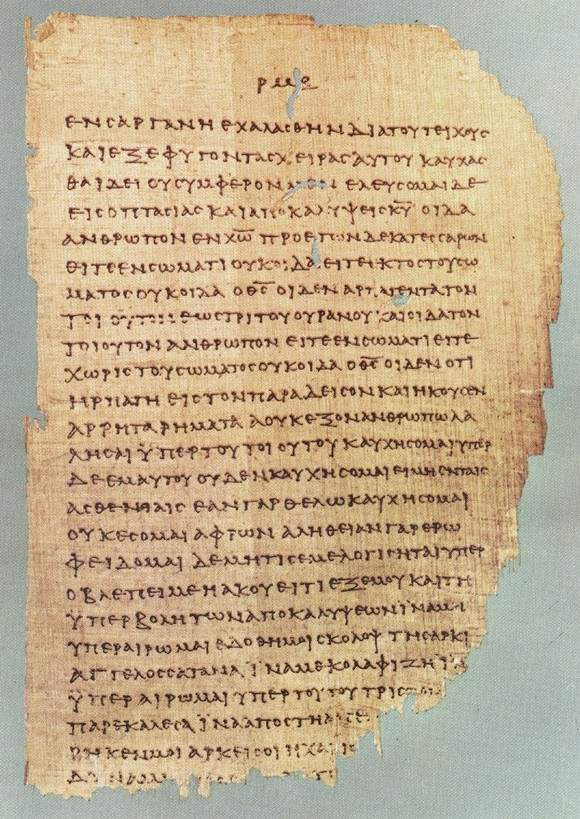
- A folio of Papyrus 46 (written ca. AD 200), containing 2 Corinthians 11:33–12:9. This manuscript contains almost complete parts of the whole Pauline epistles.
- Book: Second Epistle to the Corinthians
- Category: Pauline epistles
- Christian Bible part: New Testament
- Order in the Christian part: 8

2 Corinthians 11 is the eleventh chapter of the Second Epistle to the Corinthians in the New Testament of the Christian Bible. It was written by Paul the Apostle and Timothy (2 Corinthians 1:1) in Macedonia in 55–56 CE. According to theologian Heinrich Meyer, chapters 10–13 "contain the third chief section of the Epistle, the apostle's polemic vindication of his apostolic dignity and efficiency, and then the conclusion".

== Text ==
The original text was written in Koine Greek. This chapter is divided into 33 verses.

=== Textual witnesses ===
Some early manuscripts containing the text of this chapter are:

- Papyrus 46 (c. 200)
- Codex Vaticanus (325–350)
- Codex Sinaiticus (330–360)
- Codex Alexandrinus (400–440)
- Codex Freerianus (c. 450; extant verses 1–2,9–10,20–21,28–29)
- Codex Claromontanus (c. 550)
- Papyrus 124 (6th century; extant verses 1–4,6–9)
- Papyrus 34 (c. 650; extant verses 2,4,6–7).

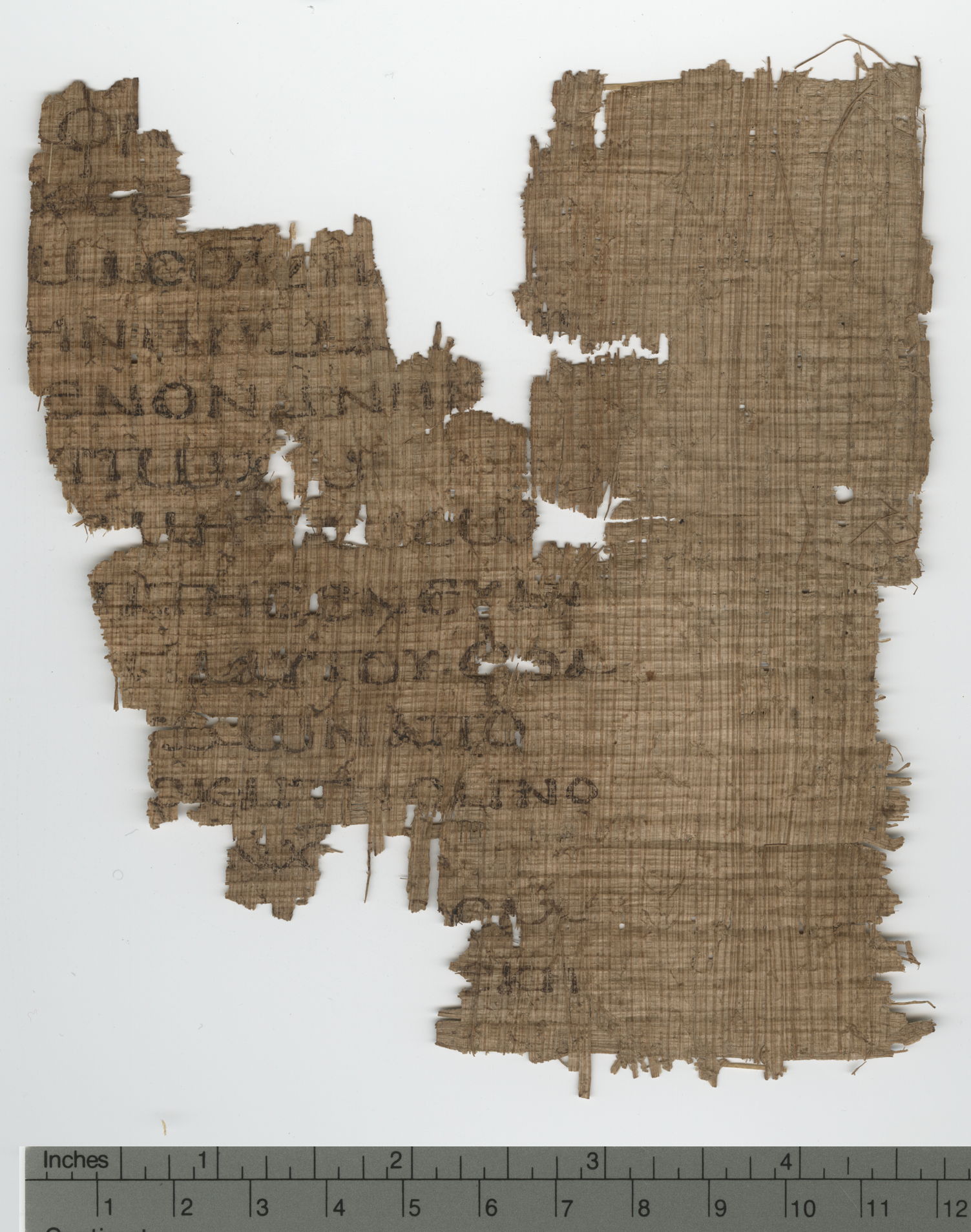
2 Corinthians 11:1–4, 6–9 in Papyrus 124 (6th century)

== False apostles ==
In verse 13, Paul writes of "false apostles" (Greek: ψευδαποστολοι, pseudapostoloi). In verse 5 he has compared himself with the "super-apostles" or the "apostles-extraordinary" (Greek: των υπερλιαν αποστολων, tōn hyperlian apostolōn). Meyer asks "Whom does he mean by τῶν ὑπερλίαν ἀποστόλων?". He notes that "according to Chrysostom, Theodoret, Grotius, Bengel, and most of the older commentators, also Emmerling, Flatt, Schrader, Baur, Hilgenfeld, Holsten, Holtzmann [among nineteenth century commentators], [he means] the actual summos apostolos, namely Peter, James, and John" but Meyer argues that "Paul is not contending against these, but against the false apostles" and recommends the translation "the over-great apostles". Meyer lists biblical commentators Richard Simon, Alethius, Heumann, Semler, Michaelis, Schulz, Stolz, Rosenmüller, Fritzsche, Billroth, Rückert, Olshausen, de Wette, Ewald, Osiander, Neander, Hofmann, Weiss, Beyschlag and others as having followed Beza's suggestion, according to which the pseudo-apostles were understood to be Judaistic anti-Pauline teachers.

== Verse 1 ==
I wish you would bear with me in a little foolishness. Do bear with me!

The King James Version adds "Would to God ye could bear with me a little in my folly". The reference to God is not part of the Greek text.

== Verse 14 ==
King James Version

And no marvel; for Satan himself is transformed into an angel of light.

New King James Version

And no wonder! For Satan himself transforms himself into an angel of light.

== Verse 19 ==
New King James Version

For you put up with fools gladly, since you yourselves are wise!

King James Version

For ye suffer fools gladly, seeing ye yourselves are wise.

== Verse 24 ==
From the Jews five times I received forty stripes minus one.

- "Forty stripes minus one" (KJV: "Forty stripes save one"): The number of stripes Paul received at each time agrees with the traditions and customs of the Jews, based on Deuteronomy 25:2–3: "forty stripes he may give him, and not exceed". In fulfilling that law, runs the tradition "with forty save one" and this is the general sense of their interpreters, as a settled rule "that scourging according to the law is with forty stripes save one" as Maimonides observes. According to the manner of scourging, a scourge of three cords could be use, that every stroke went for three stripes, so that by thirteen strokes, thirty nine stripes were given, and if a fourteenth had been added, there would have been forty two stripes and so have exceeded what the law allows. Thus Paul received the most severe scourging permitted from the Jews (cf. Matthew 10:17).

== Verse 33 ==
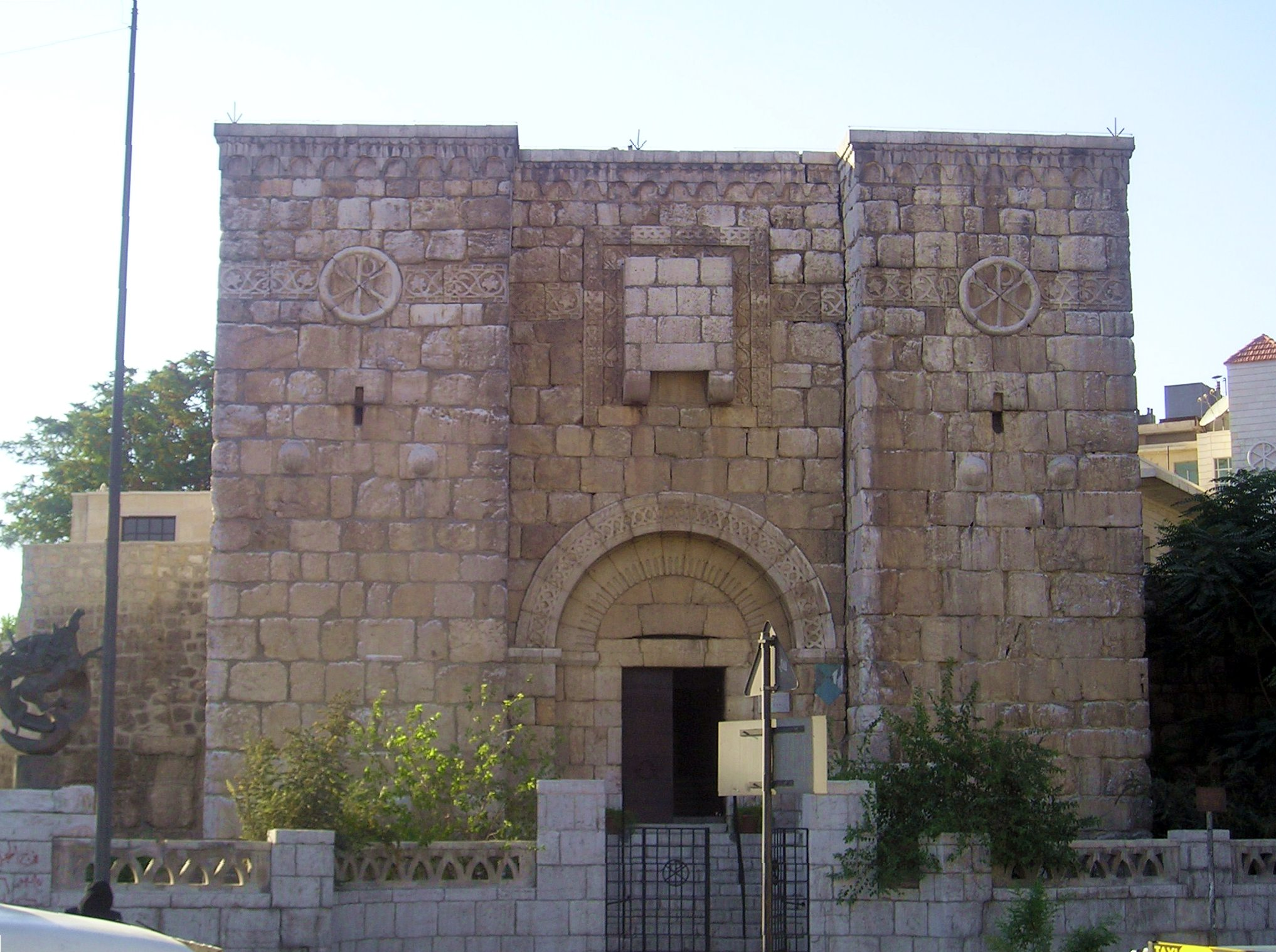
Bab Kisan gate (now Chapel of Saint Paul), believed to be where Paul escaped from persecution in Damascus

but I was let down in a basket through a window in the wall, and escaped from his hands.

- Cross reference: Acts 9:25

== Interpretation ==
Historian Paula Fredriksen, in a study of persecution of Christians in the New Testament and throughout antiquity, treats the suffering Paul lists in verses 23–26 as evidence for what his own "persecution" of Christ assemblies before his conversion may have included. She argues that Paul's own presentation of his many sufferings shows that the agents of his troubles came from varied sources. The passages refer to synagogue authorities, Roman magistrates, dangers associated with non-Jews, robbers, "my own people," "gentiles," and rival Christ-followers ("false brothers"). Fredriksen explains this hostility by Paul's mission: Paul urged gentiles to stop honoring their native gods and to worship the God of Israel alone. That demand, she argues, disrupted the traditional religious arrangements in polytheistic cities and exposed both Paul and local Jewish communities to hostility. It also created tensions for diaspora synagogues, which had long accommodated gentile sympathizers (God-fearers) without requiring them to abandon their traditional practices. For that reason, she says, Paul's message "destabilized" the synagogue's position in these environments. The passages also indicates that Paul understood persecution as coming from multiple and overlapping sources, including people from within the Christ movement itself. At the same time, the punishments he mentions seem to point to forms of communal synagogal discipline rather than purely spontaneous violence.

== See also ==
- Aretas IV Philopatris
- Chapel of Saint Paul
- Damascus
- Related Bible parts: Deuteronomy 25, Acts 9, 2 Corinthians 2, 2 Corinthians 10, Galatians 1

== Sources ==
- MacDonald, Margaret (2007). "66. 2 Corinthians". In Barton, John; Muddiman, John (eds.). The Oxford Bible Commentary (first (paperback) ed.). Oxford University Press. pp. 1134–1151. ISBN 978-0199277186.
