= Chapel of Saint Paul =

Chapel in Damascus, Syria

Chapel of Saint Paul كَنِيسَةُ مَارْ بَوْلُسْ
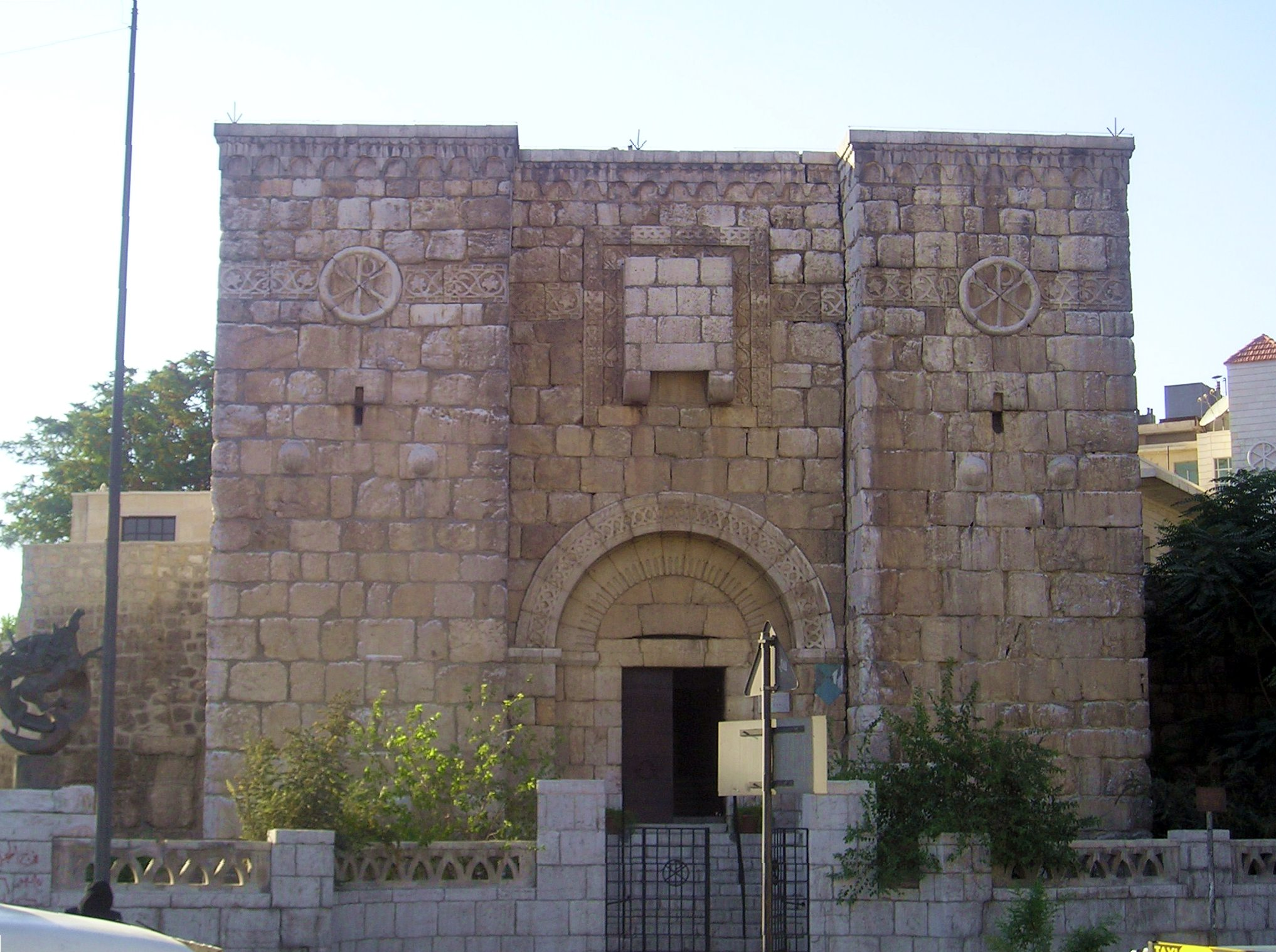
- Bab Kisan, now a chapel

Religion
- Affiliation: Melkite Greek Catholic Church
- Ecclesiastical or organizational status: Active

Location
- Location: Damascus, Syria
- Interactive map of Chapel of Saint Paul كَنِيسَةُ مَارْ بَوْلُسْ
- Coordinates: 33.506575°N 36.315595°E

Architecture
- Type: Church

The Chapel of Saint Paul (Arabic: كَنِيسَةُ مَارْ بَوْلُسْ, Kanīsat Mar Bawlus) is a church in Damascus, Syria, located along Tarafa bin al-Abd Street near the former Bab Kisan (Kisan Gate).

The chapel, consecrated in 1939, includes some stones from the Bab Kisan, which is believed to be the site of St Paul's escape from Damascus by being lowered out of a window in a basket.

== See also ==
- Related Bible parts: Acts 9:25, 2 Corinthians 11:33
