= Karl Wilhelm Ritter =

Swiss civil engineer (1847–1906)

Wilhelm Ritter
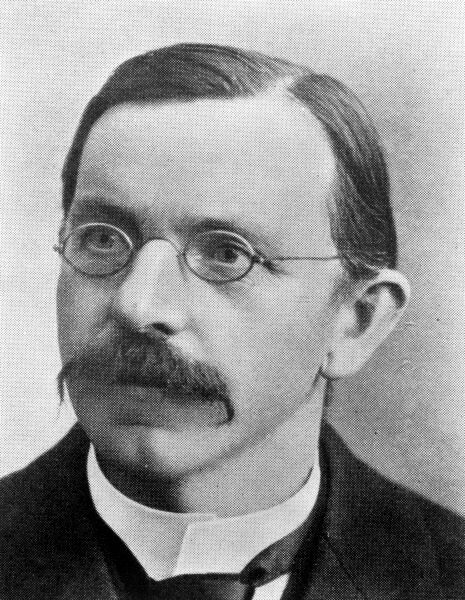
- Civil engineering
- Born: 14 April 1847; Liestal, Switzerland
- Died: 18 October 1906 (aged 59); Zell, Zürich, Switzerland
- Education: ETH Zurich
- Known for: The developer of the first design scheme of lining tunnels on the action of loads from the rock collapse
- Spouse: Magdalena Jacobi
- Scientific career
- Fields: Civil engineering
- Workplaces: ETH Zurich

Karl Wilhelm Ritter (14 April 1847 – 18 October 1906) was a Swiss civil engineer, professor of the Swiss Federal Institute of Technology Zurich, and later rector of the Polytechnic Institute of Zurich (1887–1891).

== Biography ==
Ritter was born to a teacher, Johann Friedrich Ritter, and his wife Barbara Salate on 14 April 1847.

He graduated from the Technical School in Basel (1865–68) with a diploma in engineering. In 1868, he became a railway engineer in Hungary, and in 1869, an assistant to Carl Culmann. In 1870, he became a professor of engineering at the Polytechnic Institute of Zurich, and from 1873 to 1882, a professor of engineering in Riga. From 1882 to 1905, he held a professorship of engineering in Zurich. Additionally, he would hold the rectorship of the Polytechnic Institute from 1887 to 1891.

Ritter died in Zurich on 22 October 1906, and was buried in the cemetery of Turbenthal.

== Scientific activity ==
Ritter worked on the statics of engineering structures and the construction of bridges and railways at the Polytechnic Institute of Zurich. He also continued the teachings of Culmann as a theorist. He regarded statics as an engineering discipline and also developed kinematics. One of his students was Othmar Ammann.

Ritter contributed to the theory of calculating reinforced concrete structures, and also wrote a number articles on the state of real structures. He participated in the work of the Construction Commission of Zurich and the board of the Swiss Union of Engineers and Architects (1896–98).

Ritter developed the first design scheme for tunnel lining to deal with the effects of loads from collapsing rock.

== Awards, recognition ==
- Honorary Citizen of Zurich (1889)
- Honorary Doctor of the University of Zurich (1896).

== Personal life ==
Ritter married Magdalena Jacobi, an American, in 1875. His younger brother Herman Ritter (1851–1918) was an architect. Karl Wilhelm's son, Woldemar Ritter (1880–c.1935) would also become a prominent architect, specializing in church buildings. Woldemar principally practiced in Boston and is noted for his work on Episcopal churches, especially Grace and St. Peter's Church and Emmanuel Church in Baltimore.

== Bibliography ==
- Ritter, W.: Die statik der tunnelgewölbe. - Berlin, J. Springer, 1879. - 66 p.(in German)
- Ritter, W.: Statische Berechnung der Versteifungsfachwerke der Hängebrücken, in: Schweizerische Bauzeitung, 1883. Vol. 1, No. 1, pp. 6–38. (in German).
- Ritter, W.: Anwendungen der graphischen Statik. Nach Professor C. Culmann. Erster Teil: Die im Inneren eines Balkens wirkenden Kräfte. Zurich: Meyer & Zeller, 1888. (in German).
- Ritter, W.: Anwendungen der graphischen Statik. Nach Professor C. Culmann. Zweiter Teil: Das Fachwerk. Zurich: Meyer & Zeller, 1890. (in German).
- Ritter, W.: Die Bauweise Hennebique. Schweizerische Bauzeitung, Vol. 3, 1899, No. 5, pp. 41–43, No. 6, pp. 49–52 & No. 7, pp. 59–61. (in German).
- Ritter, W.: Anwendungen der graphischen Statik. Nach Professor C. Culmann. Dritter Teil: Der kontinuierliche Balken. Zurich: A. Raustein, 1900. (in German).
- Ritter, W.: Anwendungen der graphischen Statik. Nach Professor C. Culmann. Erster Teil: Der Bogen. Zurich: A. Raustein, 1906. (in German).

== Literature ==
- Rudolf Mumenthaler: "Karl Wilhelm Ritter" in German, French and Italian in the online Historical Dictionary of Switzerland.(in German)
- Urs Widmer: Ritter, Karl Wilhelm. In: Isabelle Rucki und Dorothee Huber (Hg): Architektenlexikon der Schweiz - 19./20. Jahrhundert Basel: Birkhäuser 1998. ISBN 3-7643-5261-2 (in German)
- E. M.: Wilhelm Ritter. Nekrolog in: Schweizerische Bauzeitung, Bd 48 (1906), S. 204-206 doi:10.5169/seals-26179(in German)
- Christine Lehmann, Bertram Maurer: Karl Culmann und die graphische Statik. Ernst und Sohn, Berlin 2006, ISBN 978-3-433-01815-6.(in German)
