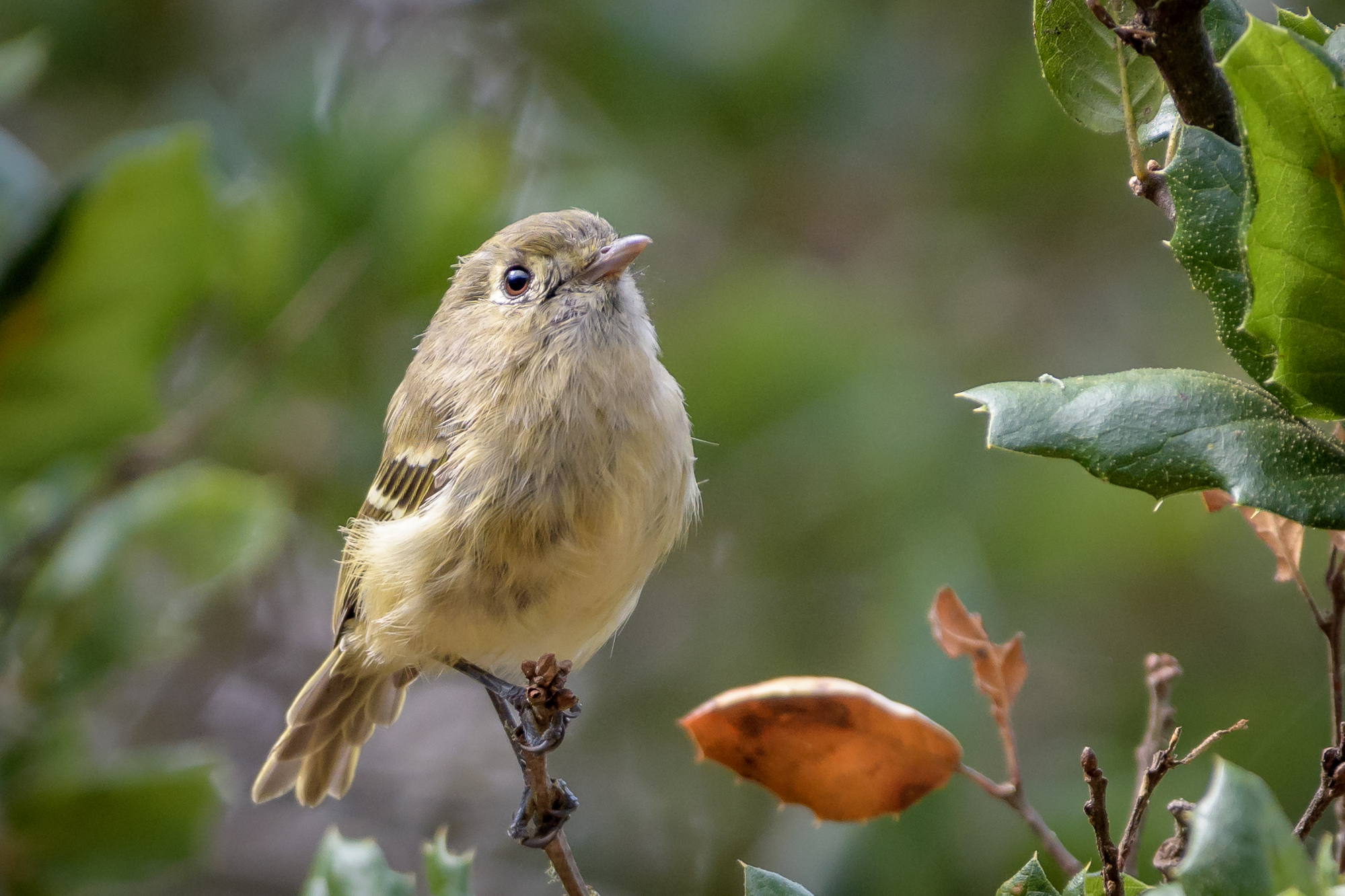

Conservation status
- Least Concern (IUCN 3.1)

Scientific classification
- Kingdom: Animalia
- Phylum: Chordata
- Class: Aves
- Order: Passeriformes
- Family: Vireonidae
- Genus: Vireo
- Species: V. huttoni

Binomial name
- Vireo huttoni Cassin, 1851

= Hutton's vireo =

Species of bird

Hutton's vireo (Vireo huttoni) is a small songbird in the family Vireonidae, the vireos, greenlets, and shrike-babblers. It is found from southwestern Canada to Guatemala.

== Taxonomy and systematics ==
Hutton's vireo was originally described in 1851 as Vireo huttoni, its current binomial. The bird's specific epithet and later its English name commemorate William Rich Hutton, "a zealous and talented young naturalist".

The taxonomy of Hutton's vireo is unsettled. The IOC and AviList assign it these 12 subspecies:

- V. h. obscurus Alfred W. Anthony, 1891
- V. h. parkesi Amadeo M. Rea, 1991
- V. h. sierrae Rea, 1991
- V. h. huttoni Cassin, 1851
- V. h. oberholseri Lois B. Bishop, 1905
- V. h. unitti Rea, 1991
- V. h. cognatus Ridgway, 1903
- V. h. stephensi Brewster, 1882
- V. h. carolinae Herbert W. Brandt, 1938
- V. h. pacificus Phillips, AR, 1966
- V. h. mexicanus Ridgway, 1903
- V. h. vulcani Griscom, 1930

The Clements taxonomy adds a thirteenth subspecies, V. h. insularis, that the IOC and AviList include within V. h. obscurus. BirdLife International's Handbook of the Birds of the World does not recognize either the IOC/AviList V. h. oberholseri or the Clements V. h. insularis.

The more northerly coastal subspecies V. h. obscurus through V. h. cognatus in the list above are separated by a wide expanse of desert from the other five subspecies and the two groups differ significantly in their genetics as well. Some authors have suggested that the two groups should be recognized as separate species. Clements recognizes the differences within the species by calling them the "Pacific huttoni" and "interior stephensi" groups.

This article follows the 12-subspecies model.

== Description ==
Hutton's vireo is 10 to 12 cm (3.9 to 4.7 in) long and weighs about 9 to 15 g (0.32 to 0.53 oz). The sexes have the same plumage. Adults of the nominate subspecies V. h. huttoni have an olive crown and nape, pale lores, a wide, broken, pale whitish eye-ring, and pale olive ear coverts. Their upperparts are olive that becomes greener on the rump. Their wing coverts are dusky olive with wide pale yellowish olive tips that show as two wing bars. Their remiges and rectrices are dusky brownish to blackish with pale yellowish olive edges on the outer webs. Their underparts are yellowish white with a pale buff to grayish olive wash.

The plumages of the Hutton's vireo subspecies generally follow Gloger's rule, with the palest, most yellowish birds are in the north and gradually becoming grayer and darker to the south. The subspecies other than the nominate differ from it and each other thus:

- V. h. obscurus: bright greenish olive crown, nape, and back, yellowish eye-ring and wing bars, olive-buff flanks, and buff-yellow underparts
- V. h. parkesi: similar to obscurus with more yellowish (less greenish) upperparts, a brighter rump, and brighter yellow underparts
- V. h. sierrae: pale grayish crown and nape, pale yellow-green back, and yellowish white underparts
- V. h. oberholseri: slate-gray crown and nape, pale olive edges on rectrices, and whiter underparts than nominate
- V. h. unitti: dusky olive back, grayish wing bars, olive edges on rectrices, and olive-gray flanks
- V. h. cognatus: grayish olive back and pale buff-yellow underparts
- V. h. stephensi: paler overall than nominate with olive gray back, yellowish white eye-ring, wing bars, and rectrix edges, and olive-buff underparts
- V. h. carolinae: similar to stephensi but darker and greener crown, nape, and back
- V. h. pacificus: darker in general than stephensi but richer more yellowish crown, rump, and rectrix edges
- V. h. mexicanus: darkest subspecies; olive-gray to olive-brown back; underparts darker on breast, sides, and flanks than on belly
- V. h. vulcani: similar to mexicanus but richer colored overall with greener crown

All subspecies have a dark brown iris, a blackish to pale brown maxilla, a paler mandible, and blue-gray to dark gray legs and feet.

== Distribution and habitat ==
Hutton's vireo has a disjunct distribution. The "Pacific" subspecies' ranges are contiguous except for V. h. cognatus; the "interior" subspecies have several discrete ranges. The subspecies are found thus:

- V. h. obscurus: south western British Columbia including Vancouver Island (V. h. insularis) south through western Washington and Oregon into northwestern California
- V. h. parkesi: northwestern and western California south to Marin County
- V. h. sierrae: eastern California's northern and central Sierra Nevada
- V. h. huttoni: from Monterey County, California south coastally into northwestern Baja California; Santa Rosa and Santa Cruz islands
- V. h. oberholseri: California Coast Ranges from Monterey County south into southern California
- V. h. unitti: Santa Catalina Island
- V. h. cognatus: southern Baja California
- V. h. stephensi: Sierra Madre Occidental from central and eastern Arizona and southwestern New Mexico south to Zacatecas state in central Mexico
- V. h. carolinae: from southwestern Texas south in eastern Mexico to Zacatecas and northwestern Hidalgo
- V. h. pacificus: southwestern Mexico from Nayarit south to southwestern Jalisco
- V. h. mexicanus: southern Mexico between central Mexico state and northern Oaxaca
- V. h. vulcani: southwestern Guatemala

The species has made casual appearances in the deserts of southeastern California and southwestern Arizona. There are also records inland from the species' core range from British Columbia south to Nevada and California and east to the Guadalupe Mountains in far western Texas.

Hutton's vireo inhabits a variety of landscapes in the subtropical and temperate zones. The "Pacific" subspecies are mostly found in evergreen forest of both conifer and live oak types. In the U. S. the "inland" subspecies are found in pine, pine-oak, and pine-oak-juniper woodlands and in Mexico in these same associations and also fir forest. In Guatemala V. h. vulcani inhabits pine-oak forest and pine savanna. In elevation Hutton's vireo ranges from sea level to about 250 m (800 ft) in British Colombia. In Washington, Oregon, and California it ranges from sea level to 1,800 m (5,900 ft). In Mexico and Guatemala the "inland" subspecies range mostly between 1,200 and 3,500 m (3,900 and 11,500 ft).

== Behavior ==
=== Movement ===
Hutton's vireo is a partial migrant, though its migration pattern is unclear. The "Pacific" subspecies in Canada and the U. S. are generally sedentary but at least in Oregon make some elevational movements after the breeding season. Individuals of these populations also wander to the east. Some members of subspecies V. h. stephensi leave Arizona, New Mexico, and northern Mexico to winter further south, though they are found year-round in Arizona's Santa Catalina Mountains. In Mexico from about Durango south and in Guatemala the species appears to be entirely non-migratory.

=== Feeding ===
Hutton's vireo feeds primarily on insects but also includes spiders and small fruits in its diet. It forages methodically, taking prey mostly by gleaning from leaves but also from flowers, twigs, and bark, sometimes hanging upside-down to do so. It sometimes briefly hovers to take prey and also captures insects in mid-air. During the breeding season the species is seen mostly in pairs. Outside of it the species is very social and is almost always found as part of a mixed-species feeding flock.

=== Breeding ===
The "Pacific" subspecies of Hutton's vireo nest between early February and August with most activity between mid-March and early July. The breeding season of the "inland" subspecies has not been studied. The species' nest is a cup hung in a branch fork and is made from a wide variety of plant fibers, plant down, lichens, mosses, grasses, feathers, and human-made fibers held together with spider web. It is typically lined with finer fibers such as grasses and hair. Both sexes build the nest. Nests have been found between about 1 and 14 m (3 and 46 ft) above the ground in a wide variety of trees and shrubs. The most common clutch size is four eggs but clutches of one to five have been found. The eggs are white with a few dark spots. Both sexes incubate the clutch, for about 14 to 16 days. Fledging occurs about 15 days after hatch. Both parents brood and provision nestlings. In some areas up to half of the nests are parasitized by brown-headed cowbirds (Molothrus ater) or bronzed cowbirds (M. aeneus).

=== Vocalization ===
The song of Hutton's vireo is highly variable among individuals and populations. The general pattern is "a monotonous and unmusical series of nasal and wheezy 2-syllable, ascending phrases: zu-wee.....zu-wee.....zu-wee.....zu-wee.....". Some variations are "descending phrases: zee-ooo.....zee-ooo.....zee-ooo.....zee-ooo......", mixed "ascending and descending phrases in the same series: zu-wee.....zee-ooo.....zu-wee.....zee-ooo.....", and "single-syllable, flat phrases... cheew.....cheew..... cheew.....cheew". It also has several calls "all with the typical, hoarse, scolding vireo quality". The species sings throughout the day and throughout the year, typically from a somewhat hidden perch in the forest subcanopy or canopy.

== Status ==
The IUCN has assessed Hutton's vireo as being of Least Concern. It has an extremely large range and its estimated population of at least 2.7 million mature individuals is believed to be increasing. No immediate threats have been identified. It is considered common in the U. S. and Mexico and "uncommon to fairly common" in Guatemala.
