= William Rich (botanist) =

Botanist and explorer from the United States

Major William Rich (1800–1864) was an American botanist and explorer who was part of the United States Exploring Expedition of 1838–1842.

== Biography ==
William Rich was the youngest son of Captain Obadiah Rich (1758–1805) who commanded the brig Intrepid in the American Revolutionary War, and his first wife Salome Lombard (1761–1807). In 1825, he co-founded the Botanic Club of Washington, and served as a joint editor of the American Botanical Register, 1825–30. Rich spent several years in Spain with his older brother, the bibliographer Obadiah Rich. He joined the Scientific Corps of the United States Exploring Expedition of 1838 as botanist, and was in the 1841 overland party headed by George F. Emmons that traveled south from the Oregon Territory along the Siskiyou Trail to upper California, before rejoining the expedition's ships in San Francisco.

Rich "found escape from having to report on the expedition's botanical collections" in the outbreak of the Mexican–American War. In November, 1846, he was appointed paymaster, with the rank of major, to the troop of United States volunteers sent to subdue California. He was accompanied by his nephews, the surveyor and artist William Rich Hutton and his younger brother James D. Hutton, also a surveyor and artist.

The volunteer troops were disbanded when the war ended in 1848, but Rich continued to serve as paymaster until his honorable discharge on October 31, 1849. Rich collected botanical specimens for the United States and Mexican Boundary Survey in 1848 and the Pacific Railroad Surveys in 1853. He served briefly as secretary to the United States legation in Mexico.

Rich Passage, a tidal strait in Puget Sound, was named in his honor by Charles Wilkes, leader of the Exploring Expedition.
