= Bab Kisan =

Coordinates: 33°30′23″N 36°18′55″E

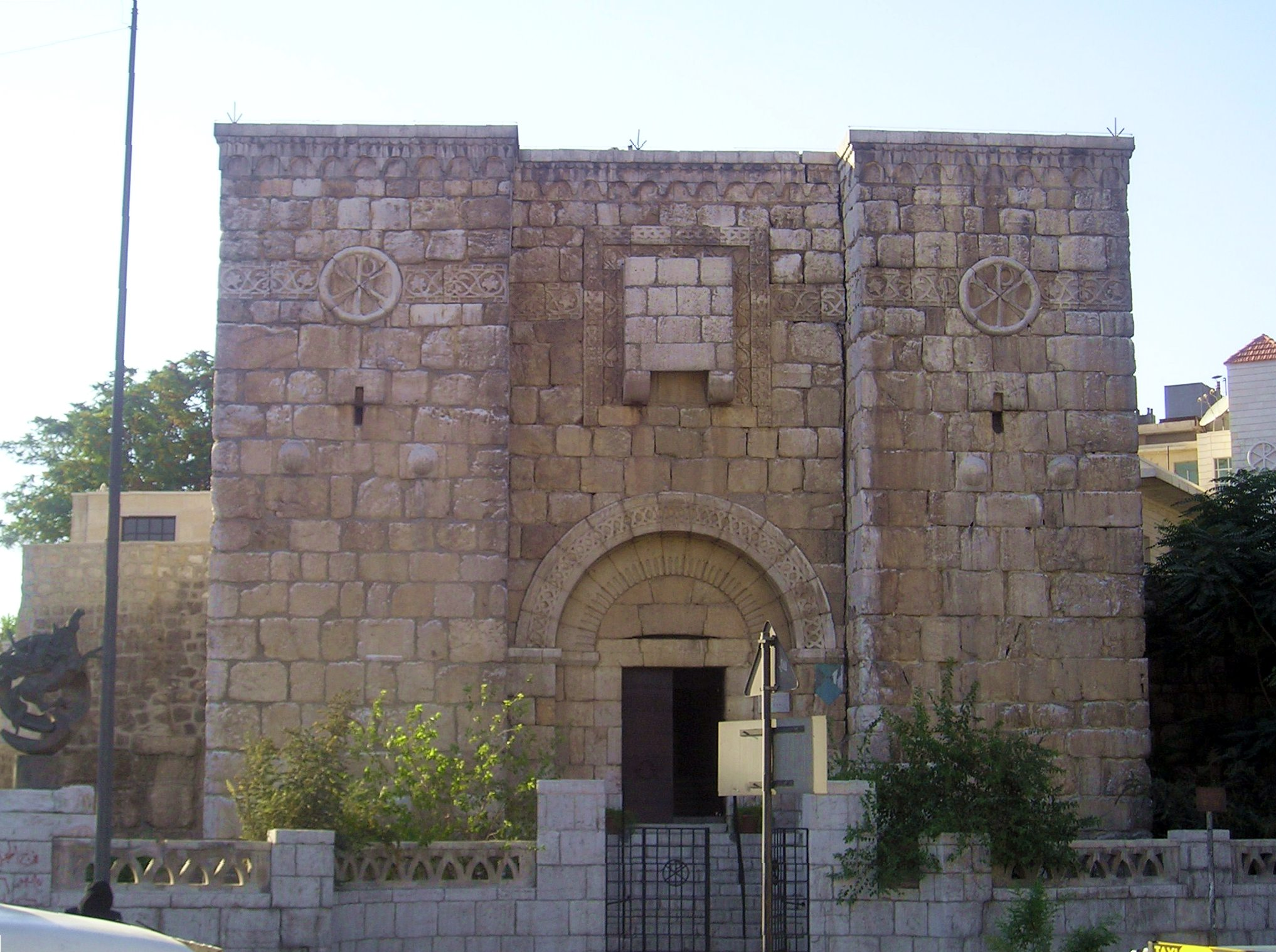
Bab Kisan

Bab Kisan (Arabic: بَابُ كِيسَانَ, romanized: Bāb Kīsān, meaning "Kisan Gate") is one of the seven ancient city-gates of Damascus, Syria. The gate, which is now located in the southeastern part of the Old City, was named in memory of a slave who became famous during a conquest by the Caliph Mu'awiya. The wall was built during the Roman era and was dedicated to Saturn. Bab Kisan may have been the escape route of St Paul.

According to the Bible, Paul settled in Damascus after having claimed (Acts 9:1–9) to have witnessed a vision where Jesus was on a road to the city. After staying three years in Damascus, he went to live in the Nabataean kingdom (which he called "Arabia") for an unknown period, then came back to Damascus, which by this time was under Nabatean rule. After three more years (Gal. 1:17;20), he was forced to flee the city under the cover of night (Acts 9:23;25; 2 Cor. 11:32ff) after explosive reactions from Jews who opposed his teachings. He was lowered down from a window in the wall, down into a basket, and with the help of his Christian disciples, he made his escape at night and fled towards Jerusalem. Paul recounts in the Bible that it was through a window that he escaped from a certain death (2 Cor 11,32-33). That is said to be the one in the Chapel of Saint Paul.
