= 2 Corinthians 13 =

- ← chapter 12 Galatians 1 →
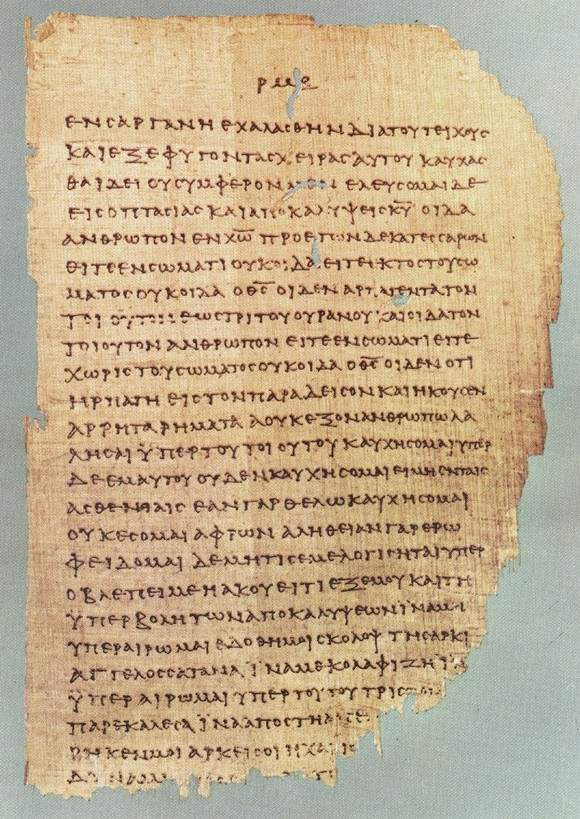
- A folio of Papyrus 46 (written ca. AD 200), containing 2 Corinthians 11:33–12:9. This manuscript contains almost complete parts of the whole Pauline epistles.
- Book: Second Epistle to the Corinthians
- Category: Pauline epistles
- Christian Bible part: New Testament
- Order in the Christian part: 8

2 Corinthians 13 is the thirteenth and final chapter of the Second Epistle to the Corinthians in the New Testament of the Christian Bible. It was written by Paul the Apostle and Timothy (2 Corinthians 1:1) in Macedonia in 55–56 CE, and concludes the letter, referring again (verses 1, 2 and 10) to Paul's intended visit to Corinth.

== Text ==
The original text was written in Koine Greek. This chapter is divided into 14 verses in most Bible versions, but 13 verses in some versions, e.g. the Vulgate, Douay-Rheims Version and Jerusalem Bible, where verses 12 and 13 are combined as verse 12 and the final verse is numbered as verse 13.

=== Textual witnesses ===
Some early manuscripts containing the text of this chapter are:

- Papyrus 46 (~AD 200)
- Codex Vaticanus (325–350)
- Codex Sinaiticus (330–360)
- Codex Alexandrinus (400–440)
- Codex Freerianus (~450; extant verses 1–2, 10–11)
- Codex Claromontanus (~550).

== Verse 1 ==
This is the third time I am coming to you. Every charge must be established by the evidence of two or three witnesses.

This rule is drawn from Deuteronomy 19:15. Margaret MacDonald notes that "at first glance" it may seem that this legal statement follows Paul's treatment of the charges against him in chapter 12, but it "fits equally well with verses 3-4 [in this chapter] where Paul warns the community of the possibility of punitive action".

== Verses 5-10 ==
These verses restate the purpose of Paul's letter: to be stern in writing so that he can be less severe when he is present in person.

== Verses 12–13 ==
Greet one another with a holy kiss. All the saints greet you.

These verses are combined as verse 12 in the Vulgate, Douay-Rheims Version and Jerusalem Bible. "All the saints" probably means all the saints or church members in Macedonia.

== Verse 14 ==
The grace of the Lord Jesus Christ, and the love of God, and the communion of the Holy Spirit be with you all. Amen.

This verse is numbered 13 in the Vulgate, Douay-Rheims Version and Jerusalem Bible. It contains a statement of the Holy Trinity of distinct persons in the Godhead. "The grace of the Lord Jesus Christ" may refer to the love of Christ (2 Corinthians 8:9) or the fullness of grace in Him as Mediator, redeeming the believers by His blood from "sin, law, and wrath", having all their sins forgiven through His sacrifice, and justifying them by His righteousness.

"The love of God" has "the Father" added in the Arabic version.

"The communion of the Holy Spirit" (KJV: "Holy Ghost", "fellowship" in the RSV and NIV) may refer to a "larger communication of the gifts and graces of the Spirit of God", called "the supply of the Spirit" (Philippians 1:19) or the communion and fellowship which the Spirit of God that leads the saints into the one with the Father, and with the Son.

"Be with you all" also reads "with your company", or "congregations", while the Arabic version reads "with all the saints".

Pope Benedict XVI suggests that these words were "probably echoed in the worship of the newborn Church". His analysis, "based on the close parallelism between the three genitives that the text establishes: ("the grace of the Lord Jesus Christ ... the love of God ... and the fellowship of the Holy Spirit), presents 'fellowship' as a specific gift of the Spirit, the fruit of the love given by God the Father and the grace offered by the Lord Jesus".

This verse, with the wording amended to "... with us all, evermore, Amen" is known as "The Grace Prayer", or simply "The Grace", and is often used at the end of church services and meetings, especially in the Methodist tradition, where it is recited by the whole assembly, generally with each person making eye-contact with the others who are present. The practice of reciting the Grace Prayer was well-established in John Wesley's time:

"It is with great reason that this comprehensive and instructive blessing is pronounced at the close of our solemn assemblies; and it is a very indecent thing to see so many quitting them, or getting into postures of remove, before this short sentence can be ended. How often have we heard this awful benediction pronounced! Let us study it more and more, that we may value it proportionably; that we may either deliver or receive it with a becoming reverence, with eyes and hearts lifted up to God, who giveth the blessing out of Sion, and life for evermore."

== Additional subscription ==
An additional subscription is found at the end of this epistle in some manuscripts, stating that it was written by Paul when he was at Philippi, a city of Macedonia, transcribed by Titus and Lucas, and by them sent or carried to the Corinthians. John Gill states that "this seems to be agreeable to what is suggested in the epistle itself, though these subscriptions are not to be depended upon. The Syriac version only mentions Luke; and some copies read, by Titus, Barnabas, and Luke."

== See also ==
- Trinity
- Related Bible parts: Deuteronomy 19, Matthew 18

== Sources ==
- MacDonald, Margaret (2007). "66. 2 Corinthians". In Barton, John; Muddiman, John (eds.). The Oxford Bible Commentary (first (paperback) ed.). Oxford University Press. pp. 1134–1151. ISBN 978-0199277186.
