= Obadiah Rich =

American diplomat

Obadiah Rich (November 25, 1777 – January 20, 1850) was an American diplomat, bibliophile and bibliographer specializing in the history of Latin America. He was credited with making the field of Americana a recognized field of scholarship by the bibliographer Nicholas Trübner.

== Life and career ==
Obadiah Rich was born on Cape Cod, at Truro, Massachusetts, on November 25, 1777. He was the son of Captain Obadiah Rich (1758–1805) who commanded the brig Intrepid in the American Revolutionary War and his first wife Salome Lombard (1761–1807). He was the older brother of the botanist William Rich.

Obadiah Rich was elected to the Massachusetts Historical Society at the early age of 22, and helped found the Anthology Society in 1804, which later became the Boston Athenæum. President James Madison appointed him American consul in Valencia, Spain, in 1816. He was consul in Madrid from 1823, and was working full-time in the book trade in London by 1830. He was again resident in Madrid and in Mahón on the island of Menorca between 1834 and 1835. He was elected a member of the American Antiquarian Society in 1834.

While in Spain, Rich compiled an extensive collection of ancient Spanish and Latin American books and manuscripts, and was part of the circle of Latin America historians and scholars that included George Ticknor, William H. Prescott, and Washington Irving, who researched his 1828 biography of Christopher Columbus while staying with Rich in Madrid.

Rich wrote A Catalog of Books relating principally to America, arranged under the Years in which they were printed, 1500-1700 (London, 1832); Miscellaneous Catalog of Books in all Languages (1834), and Bibliotheca Americana Nova, or a Catalog of Books in Various Languages, relating to America, printed since the Year 1700 (2 vols., London and New York, Volume I, 1835 and Volume II, 1846).

He died in London in 1850.

== The collection ==
Rich's books eventually were acquired by Edward G. Allen of London, and dispersed. A substantial portion were acquired by the American bibliophile James Lenox in 1848 who subsequently donated them to the New York Public Library in 1897. The Obadiah Rich Collection is now housed in the Library's Manuscripts and Archives Division.

This collection contains hundreds of original manuscripts and transcriptions of manuscripts covering the period from Christopher Columbus's first voyage of 1492 to the last years of the colonial period. The collection contains papers on New Spain (Mexico), Peru and the other Spanish colonies and Brazil. The collection is documented in the catalog Colonial Latin American Manuscripts and Transcripts in the Obadiah Rich Collection. Among his notable pieces is the only known copy of the first printing of Columbus's announcement of his discovery (Barcelona, 1493) and "The Brief and Most Concise Christian Doctrine in the Mexican Language" of Juan de Zumárraga, first bishop of Mexico. This volume is considered to be the first book printed in the Americas. It was printed in an imported press in the Casa de las Campanas in Mexico City in 1543, nearly one hundred years before the first book was printed in the English colonies.
