= Sermons of John Wesley =

Theological work by John Wesley

This is a list of the sermons of John Wesley, founder of Methodism. The first four volumes of Wesley's sermons include 44 discourses that are of special significance, while later volumes are also studied by Methodists for their doctrinal and moral teachings.

== Sermons on Several Occasions ==
Sermons on Several Occasions is a collection of discourses or sermons published by Wesley, expounding on topics such as salvation by faith, the witness of the Spirit, the means of grace, and Christian perfection. The 44 "standard sermons" are intended to equip Wesley's lay preachers with "a solid doctrinal basis and boundary for homiletical proclamation".

The first volume was published in 1746. A second volume followed in 1748 and a third in 1750, making 36 sermons in all. A fourth volume was added in 1760, bringing the total to 43, and in 1762 a 44th sermon was inserted in the second edition of volume 3. These four volumes are collectively known as Wesley's Forty-four Sermons. An additional 97 sermons were printed in several volumes. Wesley was apparently influenced by the Anglican Book of Homilies, in terms of the form (i.e. using sermons as a primary means of communication) and content.

In 1763 Wesley prepared a 'Model Deed' for his preaching-houses, which guided who would be authorised to preach. This deed stipulated that preaching must be in accordance with the doctrines contained in his Explanatory Notes Upon the New Testament and "the first four volumes of Sermons". At this time he had compiled only the four volumes. The Notes and Forty-four Sermons remain the doctrinal standards (norms) of the Methodist Church of Great Britain. These are marked * in the list below.

== List of sermons ==
- Sermon 1*: Salvation by Faith - Ephesians 2:8
- Sermon 2*: The Almost Christian - Acts 26:28, preached at St. Mary's, Oxford, on 25 July 1741. Wesley's companion George Whitefield also preached a sermon with the same title, referring to the same verse in Acts.
- Sermon 3*: Awake, thou that sleepest - Ephesians 5:14. Wesley's brother Charles also preached a sermon with the same title, referring to the same verse from Ephesians, before the University of Oxford in 1742.
- Sermon 4*: Scriptural Christianity - Acts 4:31, preached at St. Mary's, Oxford, on 24 August 1744
- Sermon 5*: Justification by faith - Romans 4:5
- Sermon 6*: The Righteousness of Faith - Romans 10:5-8
- Sermon 7*: The Way To The Kingdom - Mark 1:15
- Sermon 8*: The First Fruits of the Spirit - Romans 8:1
- Sermon 9*: The Spirit of Bondage and of Adoption - Romans 8:15
- Sermon 10*: The Witness of the Spirit: Discourse One - Romans 8:16
- Sermon 11: The Witness of the Spirit: Discourse Two - Romans 8:16
- Sermon 12*: The Witness of Our Own Spirit - 2 Corinthians 1:2
- Sermon 13: On Sin in Believers - 2 Corinthians 5:17
- Sermon 14: The Repentance of Believers - Mark 1:15
- Sermon 15: The Great Assize - Romans 14:10 - preached at the Assizes held before the Honorable Sir Edward Clive, Knight, one of the Judges of His Majesty's Court of Common Pleas, in St. Paul's Church, Bedford, on Friday, March 10, 1758; published at the request of William Cole, Esq., High Sheriff of the county, and others.
- Sermon 16*: The Means of Grace - Malachi 3:7
- Sermon 17*: The Circumcision of the Heart - Romans 2:29, preached at St Mary's Oxford on 1 January 1733
- Sermon 18*: The Marks of the New Birth - John 3:8
- Sermon 19*: The Great Privilege of those that are born of God - 1 John 3:9
- Sermon 20: The Lord our Righteousness - Jeremiah 23:6
- Sermon 21*: Upon Our Lord's Sermon on the Mount: Discourse One - Matthew 5:1-4
- Sermon 22*: Upon Our Lord's Sermon on the Mount: Discourse Two - Matthew 5:5-7
- Sermon 23*: Upon Our Lord's Sermon on the Mount: Discourse Three - Matthew 5:8-12
- Sermon 24*: Upon Our Lord's Sermon On the Mount: Discourse Four - Matthew 5:13-16
- Sermon 25*: Upon Our Lord's Sermon on the Mount: Discourse Five - Matthew 5:17-20
- Sermon 26*: Upon Our Lord's Sermon on the Mount: Discourse Six - Matthew 6:1-15
- Sermon 27*: Upon Our Lord's Sermon on the Mount: Discourse Seven - Matthew 6:16-18
- Sermon 28*: Upon Our Lord's Sermon on the Mount: Discourse Eight - Matthew 6:19-23
- Sermon 29*: Upon Our Lord's Sermon on the Mount: Discourse Nine - Matthew 6:24-34
- Sermon 30*: Upon Our Lord's Sermon on the Mount: Discourse Ten - Matthew 7:1-12
- Sermon 31*: Upon Our Lord's Sermon on the Mount: Discourse Eleven - Matthew 7:13-14
- Sermon 32*: Upon Our Lord's Sermon on the Mount: Discourse Twelve - Matthew 7:15-20
- Sermon 33*: Upon Our Lord's Sermon on the Mount: Discourse Thirteen - Matthew 7:21-27
- Sermon 34*: The Original Nature, Property and Use of the Law - Romans 7:12
- Sermon 35*: The Law Established Through Faith: Discourse One - Romans 3:31
- Sermon 36*: The Law Established Through Faith: Discourse Two - Romans 3:31
- Sermon 37*: The Nature of Enthusiasm - Acts 26:24
- Sermon 38*: A Caution against Bigotry - Mark 9:38-39
- Sermon 39*: Catholic Spirit - 2 Kings 10:15
- Sermon 40*: Christian Perfection - Philippians 3:12
- Sermon 41*: Wandering Thoughts - 2 Corinthians 10:5
- Sermon 42*: Satan's Devices - 2 Corinthians 2:11
- Sermon 43: The Scripture Way of Salvation - Ephesians 2:8
- Sermon 44*: Original Sin - Genesis 6:5
- Sermon 45*: The New Birth - John 3:7
- Sermon 46*: The Wilderness State - John 16:22
- Sermon 47*: Heaviness Through Manifold Temptations - 1 Peter 1:6
- Sermon 48*: Self-denial - Luke 9:23
- sermon 49*: The Cure of Evil Speaking - Matthew 18:15-17
- Sermon 50*: On the use of money - Luke 16:9
- Sermon 51: The Good Steward - Luke 16:2
- Sermon 52: The Reformation of Manners - Psalm 94:16, preached before the Society for Reformation of Manners on Sunday, 30 January 1763, at the chapel in West Street, Seven-Dials, London
- Sermon 53: On the Death of Mr. Whitefield - Numbers 23:10, preached at the Chapel in Tottenham Court Road and at the Tabernacle, near Moorfields, on Sunday, 18 November 1770
- Sermon 54: On eternity - Psalm 90:2
- Sermon 55: On the Trinity - 1 John 5:5, written in Cork, 8 May 1775
- Sermon 56: God's Approbation of his Works - Genesis 1:31
- Sermon 57: On the Fall of Man - Genesis 3:19
- Sermon 58: On Predestination - Romans 8:29-30
- Sermon 59: God's Love To Fallen Man - Romans 5:15
- Sermon 60: The General Deliverance - Romans 8:19-22
- Sermon 61: The Mystery of Iniquity - 2 Thessalonians 2:7
- Sermon 62: The End (Purpose) of Christ's Coming - 1 John 3:8
- Sermon 63: General Spread of the Gospel - Isaiah 11:9
- Sermon 64: The New Creation - Revelation 21:5
- Sermon 65: Duty of Reproving Our Neighbour - Leviticus 19:17, Manchester, 28 July 1787
- Sermon 66: The Signs of the Times - Matthew 16:3
- Sermon 67: On Divine Providence - Luke 12:7
- Sermon 68: The Wisdom of God's Counsels - Romans 11:33
- Sermon 69: Imperfection of Human Knowledge - 1 Corinthians 13:9, preached in Bristol, 5 March 1784
- Sermon 70: The Case of Reason Impartially Considered - 1 Corinthians 14:20
- Sermon 71: Of Good Angels - Hebrews 1:14
- Sermon 72: Of Evil Angels - Ephesians 6:12
- Sermon 73: Of Hell - Mark 9:48
- Sermon 74: Of the Church - Ephesians 4:1-6
- Sermon 75: On Schism - 1 Corinthians 12:25
- Sermon 76: On Perfection - Hebrews 6:1 (Tunbridge Wells, 6 December 1764)
- Sermon 77: Spiritual Worship - 1 John 5:20
- Sermon 78: Spiritual Idolatry - 1 John 5:21
- Sermon 79: On Dissipation - 1 Corinthians 7:35
- Sermon 80: On Friendship with the World - James 4:4
- Sermon 81: In What Sense We Are to Leave the World - 2 Corinthians 6:17-18
- Sermon 82: On Temptation - 1 Corinthians 10:13
- Sermon 83: On Patience - James 1:4
- Sermon 84: The Important Question - Matthew 16:26
- Sermon 85: On Working out our Own Salvation - Philippians 2:12-13
- Sermon 86: A Call to Backsliders - Psalm 77:7-8
- Sermon 87: The Danger of Riches - 1 Timothy 6:9
- Sermon 88: On Dress - 1 Peter 3:3-4
- Sermon 89: The More Excellent Way - 1 Corinthians 12:31
- Sermon 90: An Israelite Indeed - John 1:47 ("Behold an Israelite indeed, in whom is no guile.")
- Sermon 91: On Charity - 1 Corinthians 13:1-3
- Sermon 92: On Zeal - Galatians 4:18
- Sermon 93: On Redeeming the Time - Ephesians 5:1
- Sermon 94: On Family Religion - Joshua 24:15
- Sermon 95: On the Education of Children - Proverbs 22:6: "Train up a child in the way wherein he should go: And when he is old, he will not depart from it."
- Sermon 96: On Obedience to Parents - Colossians 3:20
- Sermon 97: On Obedience to Pastors - Hebrews 13:17
- Sermon 98: On Visiting the Sick - Matthew 25:36
- Sermon 99: The Reward of the Righteous - Matthew 25:34, preached before the Humane Society
- Sermon 100: On Pleasing All Men - Romans 15:2
- Sermon 101: The Duty of Constant Communion - Luke 22:19 (written for the use of Wesley's pupils in Oxford, 1733)
- Sermon 102: Of Former Times - Ecclesiastes 7:10
- Sermon 103: What is Man? - Psalm 8:3-4
- Sermon 104: On Attending Church Service - 1 Samuel 2:17
- Sermon 105: On Conscience - 2 Corinthians 1:12
- Sermon 106: On Faith - Hebrews 11:6
- Sermon 107: On God's Vineyard - Isaiah 5:4
- Sermon 108: On Riches - Matthew 19:24
- Sermon 109: What is Man? - Psalm 8:4 (Bradford, 2 May 1788)
- Sermon 110: On the Discoveries of Faith - Hebrews 11:1 (Yarm, 11 June 1788)
- Sermon 111: On the Omnipresence of God - Jeremiah 23:24: Do I not fill heaven and earth? saith the Lord, Portsmouth, dated 12 August 1788 by Timothy L. Smith
- Sermon 112: The Rich Man and Lazarus - Luke 16:31 (Birmingham, 25 March 1788)
- Sermon 113: Walk by Faith, or by Sight - 2 Corinthians 5:7 (London, 30 December 1788)
- Sermon 114: Unity of the Diving Being - Mark 12:32 (Dublin, 9 April 1789)
- Sermon 115: The Ministerial Office - Hebrews 5:4 (Cork, 4 May 1789; Sermon 121 in the Bicentennial Edition)
- Sermon 116: Causes of the Inefficacy of Christianity - Jeremiah 8:22 (Dublin, 2 July 1789)
- Sermon 117: On Knowing Christ after the Flesh - 2 Corinthians 5:16
- Sermon 118: On the Single Eye - Matthew 6:22-23
- Sermon 119: On Worldly Folly - Luke 12:20, preached at Balham, 19 February 1790
- Sermon 120: On the Wedding Garment - Matthew 22:12, Madeley [Shropshire?], 26 March 1790
- Sermon 121: Human Life a Dream - Psalm 73:20, August 1789
- Sermon 122: On Faith - Hebrews 11:1, 17 January 1791, probably Wesley's last sermon
- Sermon 123: The Human Heart's Deceitfulness - Jeremiah 17:9, Halifax, 29 April 1790
- Sermon 124: Heavenly Treasure in Earthly Vessels - 2 Corinthians 4:7, Potto, 17 June 1790
- Sermon 125: On Living without God - Ephesians 2:12, Rotherham, 6 July 1790
- Sermon 126: On the Danger of Increasing Riches - Psalm 62:10, Bristol, 21 September 1790
- Sermon 127: Trouble and Rest of Good Men - Job 3:17, preached at St. Mary's in Oxford on Sunday, 21 September 1735 and published at the request of several of the hearers
- Sermon 128: Free Grace - Romans 8:32, Bristol, 1740
- Sermon 129: Cause and Cure of Earthquakes - Isaiah 10:4, first published 1750
- Sermon 130: National Sins and Miseries - 2 Samuel 24:16, St. Matthew's, Bethnal Green, preached on Sunday, 12 November 12 1775 "for the benefit of the widows and orphans of the soldiers who lately fell, near Boston, in New England".
- Sermon 131: The Late Work of God in North America - Ezekiel 1:16
- Sermon 132: On Laying the New Chapel Foundation near the City Road, London - Numbers 23:23, preached on 21 April 1777
- Sermon 133: The Death of Rev. Mr. John Fletcher - Psalm 37:37, written in London, 9 November 1785
- Sermon 134: True Christianity Defended - Isaiah 2:21, dated 24 June 1721, probably intended for preaching before the University of Oxford. Copies have been found in both English and Latin.
- Sermon 135: On Mourning the Dead - 2 Samuel 12:23, preached at Epworth on 11 January 1726, at the funeral of John Griffith
- Sermon 136: On Corrupting the Word of God - 2 Corinthians 2:17
- Sermon 137: On the Resurrection of the Dead - 1 Corinthians 15:35
- Sermon 138: On Greeting the Holy Spirit - Ephesians 4:30
- Sermon 139: On Love - 1 Corinthians 13:3, preached in Savannah, 20 February 1736
- Sermon 140: On Public Diversions - Amos 3:6
- Sermon 141: On the Holy Spirit - 2 Corinthians 3:17

== Sources ==
- The Museum of Methodism and John Wesley's House, John Wesley's Sermons, Wesley's Chapel and Leysian Mission.
- Wesley Center Online, The Sermons of John Wesley - 1872 Edition (Thomas Jackson, editor), Northwest Nazarene University.
- John Wesley's Sermons
- 140 Sermons of John Wesley
- Christian Classics Ethereal Library, Sermons on Several Occasions, published in four volumes, in the year 1771
