= 2 Corinthians 4 =

- ← chapter 3 chapter 5 →
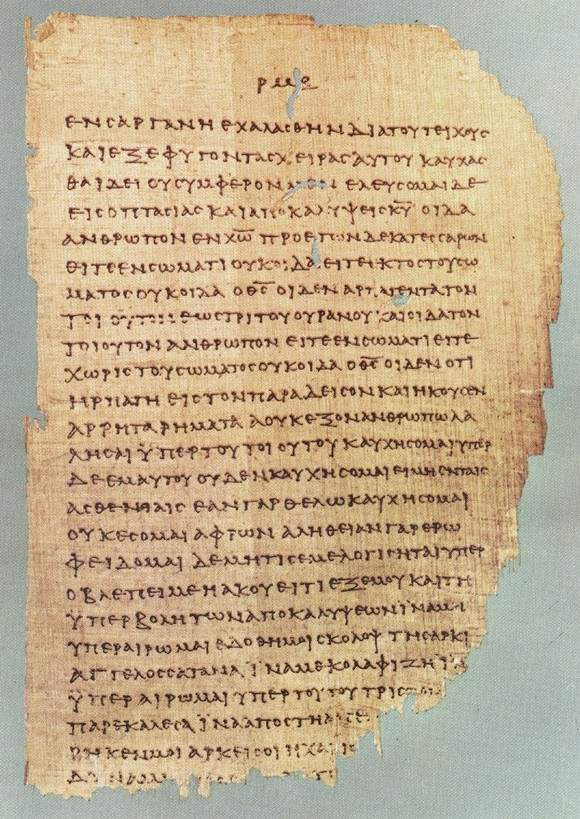
- A folio of Papyrus 46 (written ca. AD 200), containing 2 Corinthians 11:33–12:9. This manuscript contains almost complete parts of the whole Pauline epistles.
- Book: Second Epistle to the Corinthians
- Category: Pauline epistles
- Christian Bible part: New Testament
- Order in the Christian part: 8

2 Corinthians 4 is the fourth chapter of the Second Epistle to the Corinthians in the New Testament of the Christian Bible. It was written by Paul the Apostle and Timothy (2 Corinthians 1:1) from Macedonia in 55–56 CE. This chapter is part of a section (from 2 Corinthians 2:14 to 5:19) which deals with Paul's authority as an apostle. Twice in this chapter (in verses 1 and 16) this sentence occurs: "Therefore, we do not lose heart".

== Text ==
The original text was written in Koine Greek. This chapter is divided into 18 verses.

=== Textual witnesses ===
Some early manuscripts containing the text of this chapter are:

- Papyrus 46 (~AD 200)
- Codex Vaticanus (325–350)
- Codex Sinaiticus (330–360)
- Codex Alexandrinus (400–440; extant verses 1–12)
- Codex Ephraemi Rescriptus (~450)
- Codex Freerianus (~450; extant verses 6–7,16–17)
- Codex Claromontanus (~550).

=== Old Testament references ===
- 2 Corinthians 4:6: "For God, who commanded the light to shine out of darkness ..." is "reminiscent of Genesis 1:3".
- 2 Corinthians 4:13: Psalm 116:10.

== We do not lose heart ==
The Greek οὐκ ἐγκακοῦμεν (ouk enkakoumen) is a Pauline phrase used twice in this chapter, derived from the verb ἐκκακέω (ekkakeó), meaning "to faint". The word is used in three of the other Pauline epistles, and in one other New Testament text: "the example outside the Pauline corpus is found at Luke 18:8. Jesus spoke a parable concerning the constant necessity of prayer and [teaching] that the Christians should not grow weary of prayer".

== Verse 2 ==
But [we] have renounced the hidden things of dishonesty, not walking in craftiness, nor handling the word of God deceitfully; but by manifestation of the truth commending ourselves to every man's conscience in the sight of God.

As "an honourable apostle", Paul renounces "handling the word of God deceitfully", or "adulterating the word of God". The Ancient Greek: δολοῦντες τὸν λόγον τοῦ Θεοῦ, dolountes ton logon tou Theou, indicates "falsifying the word of God". At 2 Corinthians 2:17 Paul asserted that he and his companions "speak as men of sincerity".

== Verse 4 ==
The god of this age has blinded the minds of unbelievers, so that they cannot see the light of the gospel that displays the glory of Christ, who is the image of God.

"The god of this age" is Satan, who is given "a great but awful description". In John 12:31 he is called "the prince of this world", and in Ephesians 2:2 he is called "the prince of the power of the air".

== Verse 7 ==
But we have this treasure in earthen vessels, that the excellence of the power may be of God and not of us.

Baptist theologian John Gill reflects that the Christian Gospel is a "treasure" because "it contains rich truths" which are placed in "earthen vessels", i.e. "ministers of the word". It alludes either to the "earth", where hidden treasures are to be dug, or to "pots and vessels made of earth", or to "earthen pitchers", formerly to carry lights or lamps (cf. Judges 7:16: three hundred men of Gideon took empty pitchers and placed lamps within the pitchers); the latter may represent the Gospel as a "glorious light, shining in darkness" (2 Corinthians 4:4; 2 Corinthians 4:6).

The Greek word ὀστρακίνοις (ostrakinois) also refers to "shells of fishes", which Philo compared to the human body: I am (says he) very little concerned for this mortal body which is about me, and cleaves to me (ostreou diken), "like the shell of a fish"; though it is hurt by everyone. This reference may point to pearls, which are found in shells, particularly in oysters, expressing the "frail mortal bodies of the ministers of the Gospel" (comparable to the brittle shells) as they work under persecutions, for Gospel's sake (cf. Jeremiah 32:14).

== See also ==
- Jesus Christ
- Related Bible parts: Psalm 116, Romans 8, 2 Corinthians 1, 2 Corinthians 7, 2 Corinthians 12

== Sources ==
- MacDonald, Margaret (2007). "66. 2 Corinthians". In Barton, John; Muddiman, John (eds.). The Oxford Bible Commentary (first (paperback) ed.). Oxford University Press. pp. 1134–1151. ISBN 978-0199277186.
