= 2 Corinthians 9 =

- ← chapter 8 chapter 10 →
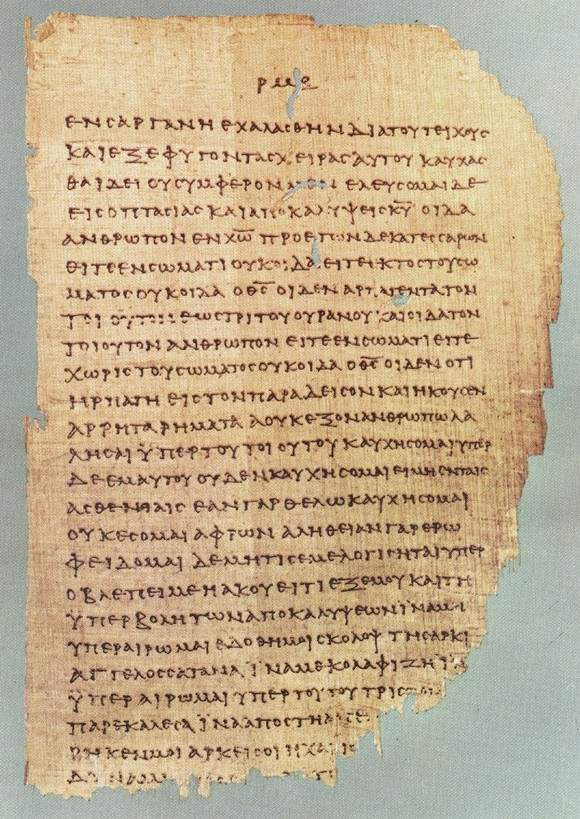
- A folio of Papyrus 46 (written ca. AD 200), containing 2 Corinthians 11:33–12:9. This manuscript contains almost complete parts of the whole Pauline epistles.
- Book: Second Epistle to the Corinthians
- Category: Pauline epistles
- Christian Bible part: New Testament
- Order in the Christian part: 8

2 Corinthians 9 is the ninth chapter of the Second Epistle to the Corinthians in the New Testament of the Christian Bible. It was written by Paul the Apostle and Timothy (2 Corinthians 1:1) in Macedonia in 55–56 CE.

This chapter continues "the topic of generous giving" commenced in the previous chapter. The eighteenth-century German theologian Johann Salomo Semler suggested that this chapter was a separate letter later inserted into 2 Corinthians. The Jerusalem Bible notes the possibility that chapter 9 was "a short note to the churches of Achaia, being inserted here subsequently to follow the instructions on the same subject ... in chapter 8. The Pulpit Commentary rejects this suggestion.

== Text ==
The original text was written in Koine Greek. This chapter is divided into 15 verses.

=== Textual witnesses ===
Some early manuscripts containing the text of this chapter are:

- Papyrus 46 (~AD 200)
- Codex Vaticanus (325–350)
- Codex Sinaiticus (330–360)
- Codex Alexandrinus (400–440)
- Codex Ephraemi Rescriptus (~450)
- Codex Freerianus (~450; extant verses 1,7–8,15)
- Codex Claromontanus (~550).

=== Old Testament references ===
- 2 Corinthians 9:7: Proverbs 22:8 (Septuagint only)
- 2 Corinthians 9:9: Psalm 112:9.

== Verse 2 ==
... I know your readiness, of which I boast about you to the people of Macedonia, saying that Achaia has been ready since last year. And your zeal has stirred up most of them.

Achaia was the region within which Corinth was located. The change of wording from "Corinth" to "Achaia" is "somewhat surprising", but it is consistent with the wording in 2 Corinthians 1, where the letter is addressed to "the church of God that is at Corinth, with all the saints who are in the whole of Achaia".

== Verses 6-7 ==
^{6} The point is this: whoever sows sparingly will also reap sparingly, and whoever sows bountifully will also reap bountifully. ^{7} Each one must give as he has decided in his heart, not reluctantly or under compulsion, for God loves a cheerful giver.

Paul provides "an assurance grounded in Scripture and partly cited from it, that as we sow, so shall we reap".

- "To sow bountifully" is literally "to sow with blessings": the spirit of the giver must encompass giving alms with blessings, such that the second reference to "bountiful" blessings simply indicates the same giving in return.
- "not reluctantly or under compulsion" (the New King James Version reads "not grudgingly or of necessity"): that is "of his own will and free choice", from one's very heart; not as directed and forced by others.
- "For God loves a cheerful giver": The Jewish phrase "with a cheerful countenance", or elsewhere "with a cheerful heart" is from the quotation: "He that doth the commandment, i.e. alms, let him do it "with a cheerful heart"." Proverbs 22:8 in the Septuagint has "God blesses a cheerful man, and a giver", which may be what Paul refers to.

== Verse 9 ==
As it is written:
"He has dispersed abroad, He has given to the poor;

His righteousness remains forever."

Citing Psalm 112:9.

== Verse 15 ==
Thanks be to God for His indescribable gift!

Paul knew that all the magnificent promises of God were guaranteed through the perfect sacrifice of Christ (cf. 2 Corinthians 1:20). Thus, that "indescribable free gift" would include all the goodness and loyal love that God would extend to mankind through Jesus. Indeed, that gift is so awe-inspiring that it cannot be fully described in human terms.

== See also ==
- Macedonia
- Titus
- Related Bible parts: Psalm 112, Proverbs 11, Proverbs 19, Matthew 10, Luke 6, Luke 21

== Sources ==
- MacDonald, Margaret (2007). "66. 2 Corinthians". In Barton, John; Muddiman, John (eds.). The Oxford Bible Commentary (first (paperback) ed.). Oxford University Press. pp. 1134–1151. ISBN 978-0199277186.
