= 2 Corinthians 8 =

- ← chapter 7 chapter 9 →
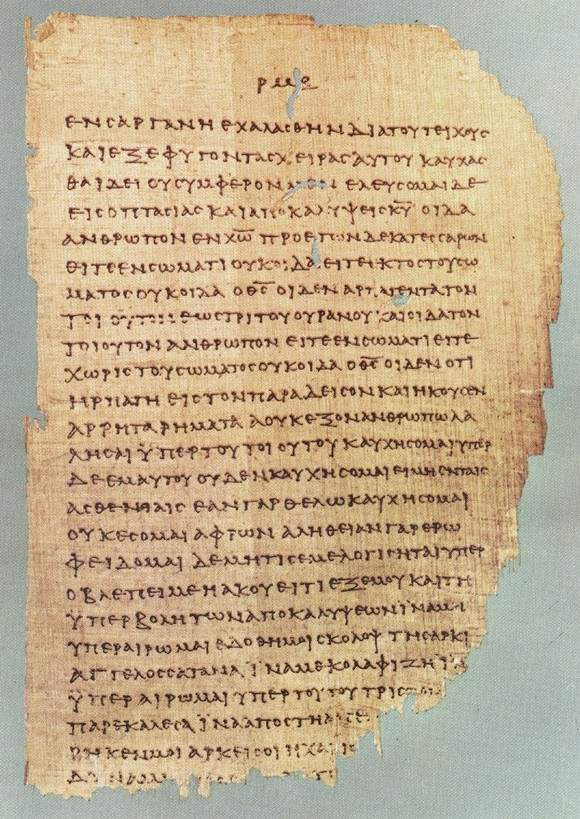
- A folio of Papyrus 46 (written c. AD 200), containing 2 Corinthians 11:33–12:9. This manuscript contains almost complete parts of the whole Pauline epistles.
- Book: Second Epistle to the Corinthians
- Category: Pauline epistles
- Christian Bible part: New Testament
- Order in the Christian part: 8

2 Corinthians 8 is the eighth chapter of the Second Epistle to the Corinthians in the New Testament of the Christian Bible. It was written by Paul the Apostle and Timothy (2 Corinthians 1:1) in Macedonia in 55–56 CE. This chapter and the next one "are devoted entirely to the topic of generous giving". Both chapters have figured prominently in academic discussion about "the fragmentation of 2 Corinthians", although "partition theories have not seemed convincing to everyone".

== Text ==
The original text was written in Koine Greek. This chapter is divided into 24 verses.

=== Textual witnesses ===
Some early manuscripts containing the text of this chapter are:

- Papyrus 46 (~AD 200)
- Codex Vaticanus (325–350)
- Codex Sinaiticus (330–360)
- Codex Alexandrinus (400–440)
- Codex Ephraemi Rescriptus (~450)
- Codex Freerianus (~450; extant verses 6–7,14–17,24)
- Codex Claromontanus (~550).

=== Old Testament references ===
- 2 Corinthians 8:15: Exodus 16:18.

== Verse 9 ==
For you know the grace of our Lord Jesus Christ, that though He was rich, yet for your sakes He became poor, that you through His poverty might become rich.

While noting that the word "grace" could be used, the Jerusalem Bible translates την χαριν του κυριου ημων ιησου (tēn charin tou kuriou hēmōn Jēsu) as "how generous the Lord Jesus was".

"Though He was rich, yet for your sakes He became poor": Pope Leo XIV observes that in this verse, Paul provides a summary of Jesus' mission in a "customarily brief but striking manner". In a longer note, the Baptist theologian John Gill comments that, from having the fullness of the Godhead in Him, for the sake of human beings, Jesus had become human and was exposed to outward poverty, born of poor parents, had no place to lay His head, was ministered to by others, had nothing to bequeath His mother at His death, but had to commit her to the care of one of His disciples; fulfilled the prophecies of Him, that He should be "poor" and "low" (Psalm 41:1; Zechariah 9:9).

== Verses 16-17 ==
^{16} Thanks be to God, who put into the heart of Titus the same concern I have for you. ^{17} For Titus not only welcomed our appeal, but he is coming to you with much enthusiasm and on his own initiative.

Paul emphasises here Titus' independence. An existing relationship between Titus and the Corinthians church is presupposed. Titus went to Corinth in response to Paul's exhortation that he should do so, and yet, even if he had not been asked, he would have gone.

== Verse 18 ==
And we have sent with him the brother, whose praise is in the gospel throughout all the churches.

For many Church Fathers, such as Pseudo-Ignatius (250 AD), John Chrysostom (407 AD), Jerome (420 AD) Pelagius (420 AD), Oecumenius (990 AD), this verse refers to Luke and his gospel. Many mainstream Bible scholars have expressed doubt about whether Luke was actually the author of the gospel which bears his name. Others considered as "the brother", among "innumerable guesses", include Silas, Barnabas, or "an actual brother of Titus".

== Collection for the Judean Saints ==
"Next to his ministry of preaching to the Gentiles, Paul's most important activity during his ministry was to collect money for the poor [believers] in Jerusalem." Paul confirms in Galatians 2:10 that this was a part of his ministry which he considered important and endorsed by the leaders of the church in Jerusalem.

== See also ==
- Macedonia
- Titus
- Related Bible parts: Luke 12, 2 Corinthians 9, Ephesians 1, Philippians 4, Hebrews 11, Revelation 3

== Sources ==
- MacDonald, Margaret (2007). "66. 2 Corinthians". In Barton, John; Muddiman, John (eds.). The Oxford Bible Commentary (first (paperback) ed.). Oxford University Press. pp. 1134–1151. ISBN 978-0199277186.
- Coogan, Michael; Brettler, Marc; Newsom, Carol; Perkins, Pheme (March 1, 2018). The New Oxford Annotated Bible: New Revised Standard Version. Oxford University Press. p. 1380. ISBN 978-0-19-027605-8.
- Perkins, Pheme (1998). "The Synoptic Gospels and the Acts of the Apostles: Telling the Christian Story". In Barton, John (ed.). The Cambridge companion to biblical interpretation. Westminster John Knox Press. ISBN 978-0-521-48593-7.
- Reddish, Mitchell (2011). An Introduction to The Gospels. Abingdon Press. ISBN 978-1426750083.
- Perkins, Pheme; Coogan, Michael D. (2010). Brettler, Marc Z.; Newsom, Carol (eds.). The New Oxford Annotated Bible: New Revised Standard Version. Oxford University Press. p. 1380.
