= 2 Corinthians 3 =

- ← chapter 2 chapter 4 →
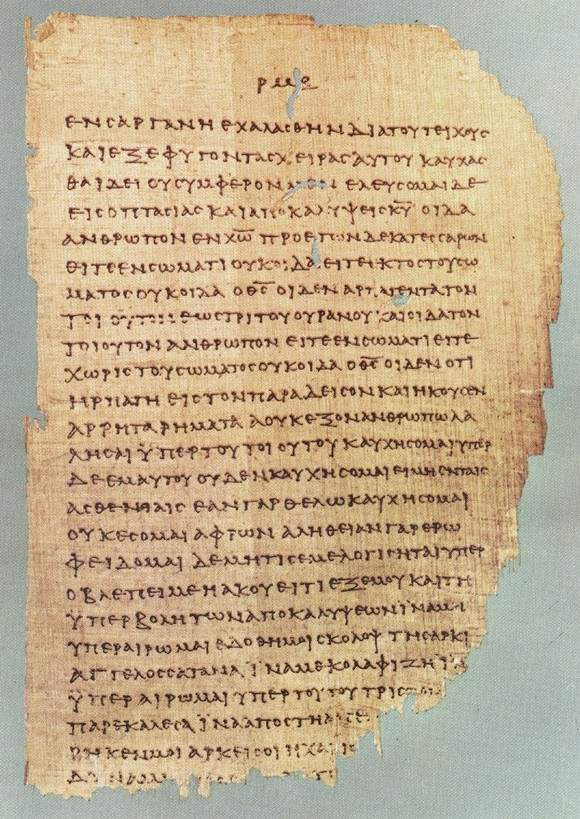
- A folio of Papyrus 46 (written ca. AD 200), containing 2 Corinthians 11:33–12:9. This manuscript contains almost complete parts of the whole Pauline epistles.
- Book: Second Epistle to the Corinthians
- Category: Pauline epistles
- Christian Bible part: New Testament
- Order in the Christian part: 8

2 Corinthians 3 is the third chapter of the Second Epistle to the Corinthians in the New Testament of the Christian Bible. It is authored by Paul the Apostle and Timothy (2 Corinthians 1:1) in Macedonia in 55–56 AD/CE. This chapter is part of a section (from 2 Corinthians 2:14 to 5:19) which deals with Paul's authority as an apostle.

Baptist theologian John Gill writes that in this chapter, "the apostle clears himself from the charge of arrogance and self-commendation, and ascribes both the virtue and efficacy of his ministry, and his qualifications for it, to the Lord". Paul uses several contrasting ideas "such as 'letter of law/Spirit', 'death/life', 'old covenant/new covenant'" to compare the old or Mosaic relationship between God and his chosen people with a new relationship central to his teaching, "established by God through Christ".

== Text ==
The original text was written in Koine Greek. This chapter is divided into 18 verses.

=== Textual witnesses ===
Some early manuscripts containing the text of this chapter are:

- Papyrus 46 (~AD 200)
- Codex Vaticanus (325–350)
- Codex Sinaiticus (330–360)
- Codex Alexandrinus (400–440; complete)
- Codex Ephraemi Rescriptus (~450)
- Codex Freerianus (~450; extant verses 6–7,16–17)
- Codex Claromontanus (~550).

== Verse 1 ==
Are we beginning to commend ourselves again? Or do we need, as some do, letters of recommendation to you, or from you?

A charge had been apparently brought against Paul before that he had indulged in unseemly self-laudation. J J Lias notes that 1 Corinthians 2:16, 3:10, 4:11-14, 9:20-27 and 14:18 all contain statements reflecting Paul's belief in himself as a minister of Christ: for example in 1 Corinthians 2:16 he asserts that "we (Paul and Sosthenes) have the mind of Christ". Paul "does not hereby condemn letters of recommendation, which in proper cases may be very lawfully given, and a good use be made of them; only that he and other Gospel ministers were so well known, as to stand in no need of them".

== Verse 2 ==
You are our epistle written in our hearts, known and read by all men;

Paul (and Timothy) call the Corinthian church their "epistle" in a similar sense to Paul's earlier description of them as his "work in the Lord, and the seal of his apostleship", in 1 Corinthians 9:1–2. Biblical commentator Heinrich Meyer emphasises that the use of the plural 'we' in this verse ("in our hearts") and in 2 Corinthians 3:6 ([we are] "ministers of the new covenant") includes Timothy in the writing of the letter.

== Verse 3 ==
New King James Version

Clearly you are an epistle of Christ, ministered by us, written not with ink but by the Spirit of the living God, not on tablets of stone but on tablets of flesh, that is, of the heart.

King James Version

Forasmuch as ye are manifestly declared to be the epistle of Christ ministered by us, written not with ink, but with the Spirit of the living God; not in tables of stone, but in fleshy tables of the heart.

Gill comments that the Corinthians were "manifestly declared to be the epistle of Christ ministered by [Paul], so that the apostles and ministers of the word were only amanuenses, Christ was the author and dictator [of the message]". This "manifest" visibility affirms the wording in the previous verse, assertng that "everyone can see that we have done a good work among you". Gill further observes that the Corinthian believers have become the "living epistles of Christ", and in general the saints (believers) acquire a "living disposition of the soul in likeness to Him".

On Mount Sinai, the primary (Mosaic) law was written on tablets of stone. They were made twice: the first by God Himself, the latter were hewn by Moses, at the command of God. The former are said to be "miraculously made, and not by the means and artifice of men", even that "they were made before the creation of the world", which, the Jewish writers say, were made of sapphire, but they were broken by Moses when he came down from the mountain. Both the former and the latter were of two stones of an equal size, in the form of small tables, such as for children to learn to write, each with the dimensions of six hands long, six hands broad and three hands thick, weighing forty "seahs" (a miracle that Moses should be able to carry them). On these stones were written the "Ten Commandments", that five were written on one table, and five on the other, as noted by Josephus, Philo, and the Talmudic writers, and were written on both sides (Exodus 32:15).

"Fleshly tables of the heart" alludes to Ezekiel 36:26, not "carnal hearts", but the ones "made soft and tender by the Spirit of God". The phrase "table of the heart" is found in the books of the Old Testament (Proverbs 3:3; Proverbs 7:3; Jeremiah 17:1) and frequently in other Jewish writings.

== Verse 6 ==
Who also made us sufficient as ministers of the new covenant, not of the letter but of the Spirit; for the letter kills, but the Spirit gives life.

- "Made us sufficient as ministers": This is an answer to the question in (2 Corinthians 2:16: who is sufficient for these things?) that 'our sufficiency' is of God, for he had enabled Paul and his co-workers to be "sufficient ministers", which is totally God's making.

== Verse 17 ==
Now the Lord is the Spirit; and where the Spirit of the Lord is, there is liberty.

"Liberty" means freedom from the law (cf. Galatians 5:18) and the transformation of believers.

In January 2016, promoting his candidacy in the 2016 Republican Party presidential primaries, Donald Trump gave a speech at Liberty University citing this verse. His reference to "2 Corinthians" as "two" rather than "second" caused some to doubt his Christian bona fides. Tony Perkins, president of the Family Research Council, had suggested this scriptural citation, in writing.

== Verse 18 ==
But we all, with unveiled face, beholding as in a mirror the glory of the Lord, are being transformed into the same image from glory to glory, just as by the Spirit of the Lord.

- "By the Spirit of the Lord": or "from the Lord, the Spirit"
- "The same image": The image of the believer, reflected as in a mirror, becomes that of Christ (cf. 2 Corinthians 4:6; 1 Corinthians 11:7).

== See also ==
- Titus
- Related Bible parts: Exodus 24, Exodus 31, Exodus 34, Jeremiah 31, Ezekiel 11, Matthew 22, Matthew 26, Romans 13

== Sources ==
- MacDonald, Margaret (2007). "66. 2 Corinthians". In Barton, John; Muddiman, John (eds.). The Oxford Bible Commentary (first (paperback) ed.). Oxford University Press. pp. 1134–1151. ISBN 978-0199277186.
