= P117 =

P117 may refer to:

- ARM Mariano Matamoros (P117), a patrol boat of the Mexican Navy
- C19orf70, chromosome 19 open reading frame 70, a protein
- Papyrus 117, a biblical manuscript
- P117, a state regional road in Latvia
