= 2 Corinthians 6 =

- ← chapter 5 chapter 7 →
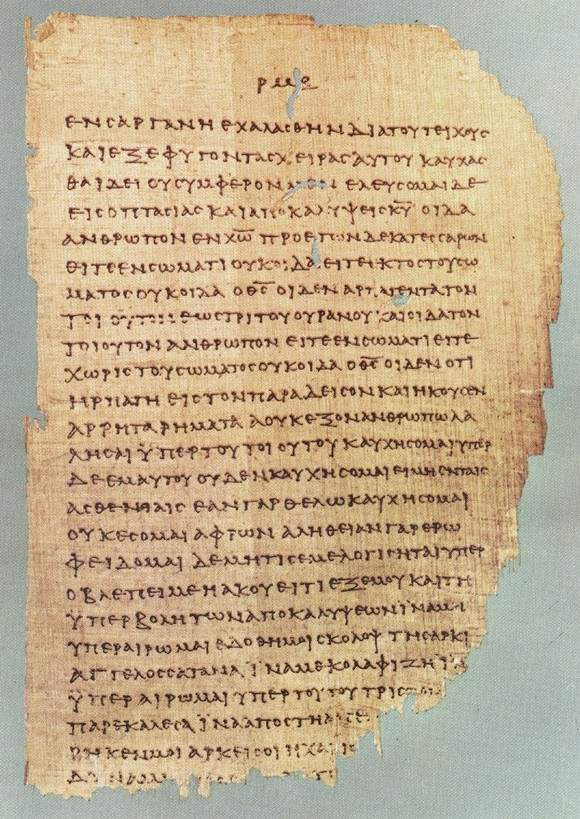
- A folio of Papyrus 46 (written ca. AD 200), containing 2 Corinthians 11:33–12:9. This manuscript contains almost complete parts of the whole Pauline epistles.
- Book: Second Epistle to the Corinthians
- Category: Pauline epistles
- Christian Bible part: New Testament
- Order in the Christian part: 8

2 Corinthians 6 is the sixth chapter of the Second Epistle to the Corinthians in the New Testament of the Christian Bible. It was written by Paul the Apostle and Timothy (2 Corinthians 1:1) in Macedonia in 55–56 CE. Verses 1 and 2 are closely linked with the end of the previous chapter ("working together with him" in verse 1 follows the references to either God or Christ in 2 Corinthians 5:16-21). Verses 14-18, together with 2 Corinthians 7:1, are often seen as an interpolation.

== Text ==
The original text was written in Koine Greek. This chapter is divided into 18 verses.

=== Textual witnesses ===
Some early manuscripts containing the text of this chapter are:

- Papyrus 46 (~AD 200)
- Codex Vaticanus (325–350)
- Codex Sinaiticus (330–360)
- Codex Alexandrinus (400–440)
- Codex Ephraemi Rescriptus (~450)
- Codex Freerianus (~450; extant verses 6–8,16–18)
- Codex Claromontanus (~550).

=== Old Testament references ===
- 2 Corinthians 6:2: Isaiah 49:8
- 2 Corinthians 6:16: Leviticus 26:12; Jeremiah 32:38; Ezekiel 37:27
- 2 Corinthians 6:17: Isaiah 52:11; Ezekiel 20:34,41
- 2 Corinthians 6:18: 2 Samuel 7:14

== Verse 1 ==
Working together with him, then, we appeal to you not to receive the grace of God in vain.

Interpretations vary as to whether the Ancient Greek: συνεργουντες, sunergountes) here refers to Christ (cf. 2 Corinthians 5:20) or to God (cf. 2 Corinthians 5:21). The American Standard Version notes "with him" as additional wording. Other texts focus on "working together" as meaning that "the apostles and ministers to whom Paul refers were joint-laborers", not necessarily adding a "with him" clause. "The word properly means, to work together; to cooperate in producing any result".

== Verse 2 ==
Paul quotes the first part of Isaiah 49:8, using the Septuagint version. The full text of this verse reads:

Thus saith the Lord,
"In an acceptable time have I heard thee, and in a day of salvation have I succored thee: and I have formed thee, and given thee for a covenant of the nations, to establish the earth, and to cause to inherit the desert heritages".

The promised hearing and salvation are offered first to the "suffering servant" in the time of the prophet Isaiah. J J Lias notes that they are applied first to Christ, in accordance with the Christian interpretation of the servant songs, and then, here to Christ's "covenant people". Paul adds that the day concerned is "now": William Robertson Nicoll notes that νῦν (nun, generally meaning "now") should not be read as "today" as if "the only day of grace which we can reckon on is the present", but as a reference to "the present dispensation".

== Verses 3-13 ==
Paul affirms that he offered no "obstacle" to salvation, and appears to believe that it is easy for ministers of the gospel to become obstacles, for example through "rhetoric devoid of content". The word προσκοπην (proskopēn), translated as "obstacle", is used only here in the New Testament, but it is equivalent to the more frequently encountered word σκάνδαλον (skandalon), and to πρόσκομμα (proskomma), which appears in Romans 14:13.

== Verses 14-18 ==
These verses, together with 2 Corinthians 7:1, are often seen as an interpolation.

=== Verse 14 ===
Do not be unequally yoked together with unbelievers. For what fellowship has righteousness with lawlessness? And what communion has light with darkness?

"Do not be unequally yoked together with unbelievers" may refer to the law in Deuteronomy 22:10, which is understood not to forbid civil society and converse with unbelievers, but to prohibit joining unbelievers in acts of idolatry, as one of the arguments is, "what agreement has the temple of God with idols?" which seemingly happened at that time (cf. 1 Corinthians 10:14; 1 Corinthians 10:20–22). In "what fellowship has righteousness with lawlessness" (or KJV: unrighteousness"): this "righteousness" means righteous persons, having the kingdom of God in them.

These verses have been understood in traditional forms of Christianity as prohibiting a marriage between a Christian and a non-Christian.

Nevertheless an alternative view is that the passage is not an interpolation, but the climax of Paul's apostolic defence, and that it sits neatly within the context of his argument. This view, proposed initially by Michael Goulder, rests on understanding that the word commonly translated as "unbelievers", Ancient Greek: ἄπιστοι, means unfaithful, and here refers to those who had come from the Jerusalem church and opposed Paul. In this reading, Paul is asking the Corinthian Christians to separate from the unfaithful in the church, and has not changed subject to marriage. The argument then exactly parallels the structure of Paul's arguments in 1 Corinthians 1-5. Other commentators who have made similar arguments include David de Silva, Todd Lang, and Philip Esler.

== See also ==
- Transfiguration of Jesus
- Related Bible parts: Leviticus 26, Isaiah 49, Isaiah 52, Isaiah 55, Psalm 69, Romans 8, Revelation 6, Revelation 21

== Sources ==
- MacDonald, Margaret (2007). "66. 2 Corinthians". In Barton, John; Muddiman, John (eds.). The Oxford Bible Commentary (first (paperback) ed.). Oxford University Press. pp. 1134–1151. ISBN 978-0199277186.
