= 2 Corinthians 5 =

- ← chapter 4 chapter 6 →
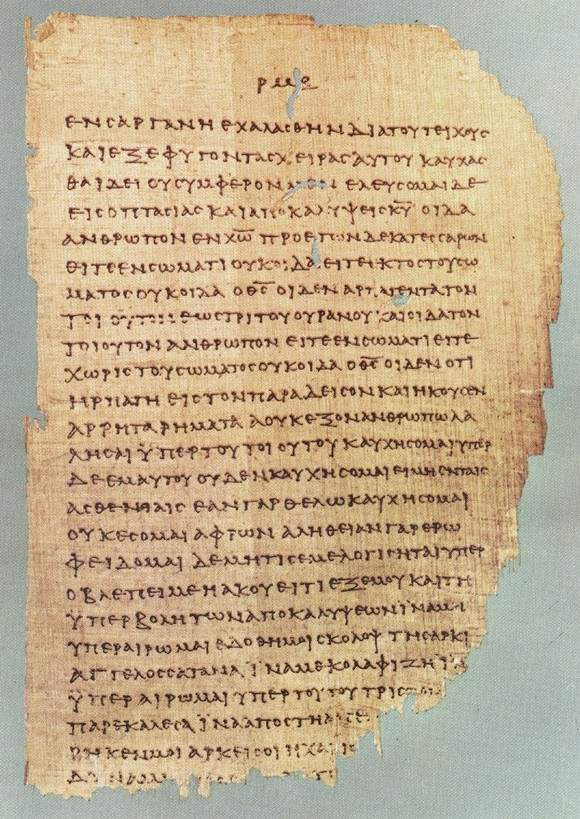
- A folio of Papyrus 46 (written ca. AD 200), containing 2 Corinthians 11:33–12:9. This manuscript contains almost complete parts of the whole Pauline epistles.
- Book: Second Epistle to the Corinthians
- Category: Pauline epistles
- Christian Bible part: New Testament
- Order in the Christian part: 8

2 Corinthians 5 is the fifth chapter of the Second Epistle to the Corinthians in the New Testament of the Christian Bible. It was written by Paul the Apostle and Timothy (2 Corinthians 1:1) in Macedonia in 55–56 CE.

The 18th-century theologian John Gill (1697-1771) summarises the contents of this chapter:

The apostle, in this chapter, enlarges upon the saints' comfortable assurance, expectation, and desire of the heavenly glory; discourses of the diligence and industry of himself and other Gospel ministers in preaching the word, with the reasons that induced them to it; and closes it with a commendation of the Gospel ministry from the important subject, sum, and substance of it.

== Text ==
The original text was written in Koine Greek. This chapter is divided into 21 verses.

=== Textual witnesses ===
Some early manuscripts containing the text of this chapter are: (Note: The page(s) containing this chapter is currently missing from Codex Alexandrinus.)

- Papyrus 46 (c. AD 200)
- Codex Vaticanus (325–350)
- Codex Sinaiticus (330–360)
- Codex Ephraemi Rescriptus (c. 450)
- Codex Freerianus (c. 450; extant verses 8–10,17–18)
- Codex Claromontanus (c. 550).

== Verse 1 ==
For we know that if our earthly house, this tent, is destroyed, we have a building from God, a house not made with hands, eternal in the heavens.

"Our earthly house" refers to the body; similarly, Plato also calls the body Ancient Greek: γὴινον σκήνον, gēinon skēnov, "an earthly tabernacle", just as the Jews call the body a house or a "tabernacle". Abarbinel paraphrases Isaiah 18:4 "my dwelling place, which is the body, for that is "the tabernacle of the soul"."

The "house not made with hands, eternal in the heavens" can be interpreted as the "glorified body" (after the resurrection), or "the holy house" in the world to come, which might be intended in Isaiah 56:5 or Proverbs 24:3.

== Verse 6 ==
So we are always of good courage. We know that while we are at home in the body we are away from the Lord.

Otto Paul (O. P.) Kretzmann notes that in the life of a Christian believer, "there is a yearning for home, a homesickness for heaven". Harold H. Buls comments that "this verse touches on the great paradox in the life of the Christian": although believers are homesick, they are cheerful; they long for heaven, but they are content.

== Verses 18-19 ==
^{18} All this is from God, who through Christ reconciled us to himself and gave us the ministry of reconciliation; ^{19} that is, in Christ God was reconciling the world to himself, not counting their trespasses against them, and entrusting to us the message of reconciliation.

MacDonald suggests that the passage from 2 Corinthians 2:14 onwards, in which Paul defends his authority as an apostle, ends here at 2 Corinthians 5:19. She notes that the next section (verse 20 to 2 Corinthians 6:2) is "closely related" to the foregoing text, while also initiating "a new type of exhortation".

== See also ==
- Transfiguration of Jesus
- Related Bible parts: Isaiah 53, Romans 3, Romans 4, 2 Corinthians 4, Revelation 6

== Sources ==
- MacDonald, Margaret (2007). "66. 2 Corinthians". In Barton, John; Muddiman, John (eds.). The Oxford Bible Commentary (first (paperback) ed.). Oxford University Press. pp. 1134–1151. ISBN 978-0199277186.
