= John Bell (bishop of Worcester) =

English bishop

The Right Reverend John Bell
- Bishop of Worcester
- Church: Church of England
- Province: York
- Diocese: Worcester
- In office: 1539–1543
- Predecessor: Hugh Latimer
- Successor: Nicholas Heath

Orders
- Consecration: 1539

Personal details
- Died: 11 August 1556 Clerkenwell, London, Kingdom of England
- Denomination: Anglicanism
- Education: Balliol College, Oxford

John Bell (died 11 August 1556) was a Bishop of Worcester (1539–1543), who served during the reign of King Henry VIII.

== Education ==
Bell was educated at Balliol College, Oxford, and later at Cambridge, where he took the degree of Bachelor of Civil Law in 1503/4.

== Career ==
Following this advancement he was promoted to other posts:

"Canon and prebendary of the collegiate church of St. Stephen in Westminster Palace (until 1539);"; 1526 Collated: Warden of the church of Stratford-Upon-Avon, Preceptor of the hospital of St.Wulstans, Magister, Bachelor of Civil law, acta capitularia (Chapter act book) Coventry & Lichfield diocese 1528 Collated: Doctor of Canon law, Lincoln Cathedral, Doctor of Civil law, St. Pauls, Rector of Gloucestershire, Weston-sub-Edge, Lichfield, Southwell and St.Paul's, Cathedrals 1529 Collated: Magister, Doctor of Civil law Gloucester, 1539 Collated: Archdeacon of Gloucester.

Wolsey, would appoint Bell to the membership of the Legantine court of audience, where in 1523, he examined William Tyndale on charges of heresy.

One such mission was to secure a religious and political relationship with the Lutheran Princes in Germany. While abroad Bell was made LL.D of some foreign university, in which his degree was incorporated at Oxford in 1531.

=== King's Great Matter ===
In 1531, primarily as a result of the innovative suggestion of Thomas Cranmer, who thought the King's position in the divorce would be strengthened by obtaining favourable opinions from the various universities in England and abroad, Henry VIII sent Dr. Bell, together with the bishop of Lincoln and Foxe, to deliver a letter that he had personally drafted and to canvass Oxford, for a favourable opinion concerning the King's cause; of which they successfully secured despite the danger, being pelted with stones by the popish opposition, together while overcoming the strong resistance from the junior members of convocation.

In the same year he was also one of a commission including Sir Thomas More to assist the Archbishop in preparing the royal proclamation against William Tyndale's translation of the Scriptures and a number of heretical books.

In 1532 he took part in the proceedings of the convocation which decided that the King's marriage was contrary to divine law, and consequently that the pope's dispensation was ultra vires, and which drew up 'the articles about religion,' of which the original may be seen, with John Bell's name attached, in the Cotton Library.

"He served as proctor for the king at the trial at Dunstable Abbey [May 10–17, 1533] which definitively nullified Henry's first marriage in time for the coronation of Anne Boleyn."

In 1537, Bell was one of the composers of the Bishop's Book, properly entitled The Institution of the Christian Man.

=== Bishopric of Worcester 1539–1543 ===
In 1539, John Bell succeeded Hugh Latimer as bishop of Worcester and was consecrated by Cranmer on 17 August. In the same year he was present during the baptism of Edward, Prince of Wales at Hampton Court. John Bell's elevation to bishop was accompanied with a difficult managerial legacy, that followed in the wake of Latimer's ambitious reform agenda, and Bell did what he could to restore order and balance while rebuilding the diocese; this has been fairly appraised and noted in that he 'laboured to reverse' Latimer's abrupt restructuring.

In 1540, Bell was a member of the committee of convocation which pronounced the marriage of Henry VIII and Anne of Cleves illegal.

In 1541, Bell supported Archbishop Cranmer in the House of Lords when Cranmer was attempting to bring forward an act for the advancement of the true religion and the abolishment of the contrary" however, this caused a great disruption within the conservative factions and when Bell witnessed this 'he fell away from him' ^{(Stripe, Cranmer, p. 141),}

In the convocation of 1542, when the bishops undertook the work of a revised translation of the New Testament, the first and second epistles to the Thessalonians were assigned to Bell.

On 17 November 1543, at Hartlebury Castle, bishop Bell resigned from the see of Worcester with a pension of £133-6s–81/2d, and retired to the parish of Clerkenwell, where he was priest until his death, 11 August 1556.

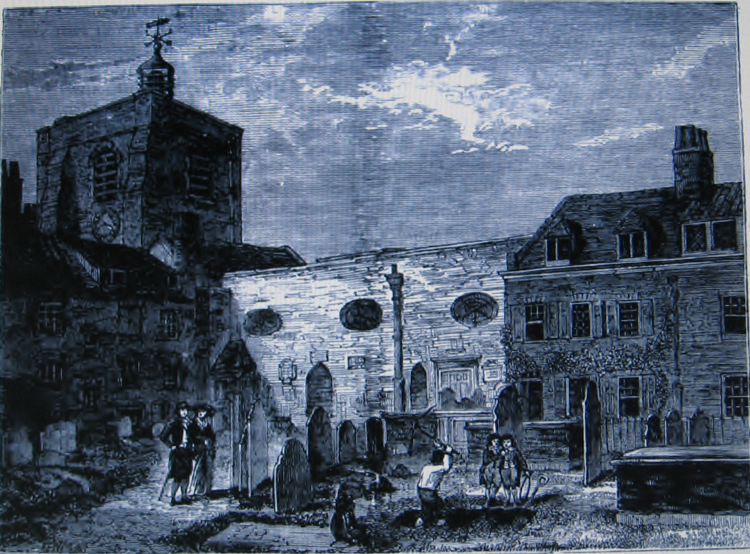
"The old Church of St. James, Clerkenwell,"

== Final years ==
Bell retired to London where he was priest of the parish church in Clerkenwell, until his death.

An account of his funeral was recorded by Mr. Green, a historian of Worcestershire:

" Dr. Bell, sometime bishop of Worcester, was buried with due respect August 13, at Clerkenwell, with a sermon preached by Nicholas Harpsfield; he was put into his coffin, like a bishop, with the mitre and other pontificalibus; his funeral was illuminated with two white branches, two dozen staff torches, and four great tapers, [near the altar]" ^{(Strype, Memorials, Vol. 3, p. 305)}

"He gave by his will 2l. to the poor of Clerkenwell, 5l. to Stratford-upon-Avon, and some legacies to Jesus chantry in St. Paul's Cathedral, desiring that 'his soul might be prayed for.' He was also a benefactor to Balliol College, Oxford, and to Cambridge, but especially to the former, where he provided for the maintenance of two scholars born in the diocese of Worcester."

"Coote says of bishop Bell ^{(English Civilians)}: That 'He died with the character of an eloquent preacher and advocate, a learned divine, and a man of integrity and beneficence.'"

Church of England titles
Preceded by Hugh Latimer	Bishop of Worcester; 1539–1543	Succeeded by Nicholas Heath
