= Epistle of Pseudo-Titus =

The Epistle of Pseudo-Titus is a letter attributed to Titus, a companion of Paul of Tarsus, to an unidentified ascetic community of Christian men and women. It commends the life of chastity and condemns all sexual activity, even that within marriage, as sinful. The epistle is classified under the Apocryphal New Testament and survives only in the Codex Burchardi, an eighth-century Latin manuscript, discovered in 1896 among the homilies of Caesarius of Arles. The Latin epistle contains many solecisms which originated with an author who lacked proficiency with Latin and Greek. The origins of the epistle remain unclear; however, it contains strong features of encratism. It may have connections with the Priscillianist movement in fifth century Spain.

== Sources ==
The epistle contains about a hundred citations from the Old Testament, New Testament, and other apocryphal writings; Pseudo-Titus most frequently cites the Book of Psalms, the Book of Ezekiel, the Gospels, 1 Corinthians, 2 Corinthians, the Epistle to the Galatians, and the Book of Revelation, however, his citations are diverse, and a few citations remain unknown.

The story about Peter blessing a gardener's daughter has gained the attention of biblical scholars as it may derive from a lost portion of the Acts of Peter and has generated discussion about apostolic influence on family life among early Christians. The epistle may contain a lost story from the Acts of Andrew which entails the apostle Andrew attending a wedding to teach celibacy to the men and women there.

== Content ==
The epistle's author writes to a Christian monastic community of men and women who have fallen into sin by having sexual relations with one another. The first portion of the epistle addresses the Christian woman as "virgin" while most of the remainder is addressed to the Christian man. Pseudo-Titus reminds his audience of their fear of eternal punishment, as mentioned in the Book of Revelation as a means to deter the ascetic away from sensual temptation and sexual immorality. Pseudo-Titus gives ample citations and exegeses in support of strict celibacy, usually citing Paul first in a series of citations. The epistle reveals to its reader that the women serve the ascetic men in the monastic community. Pseudo-Titus suggests that since the men cannot behave righteously in the presence of their ascetic female members, that they ought to seclude themselves into a monastic community of their own. In support of this argument, Pseudo-Titus gives the illustration of the story of Susanna and the Elders, which exemplifies the Jewish elders who also could not practice chastity in the presence of women.
