= 2 Corinthians 7 =

- ← chapter 6 chapter 8 →
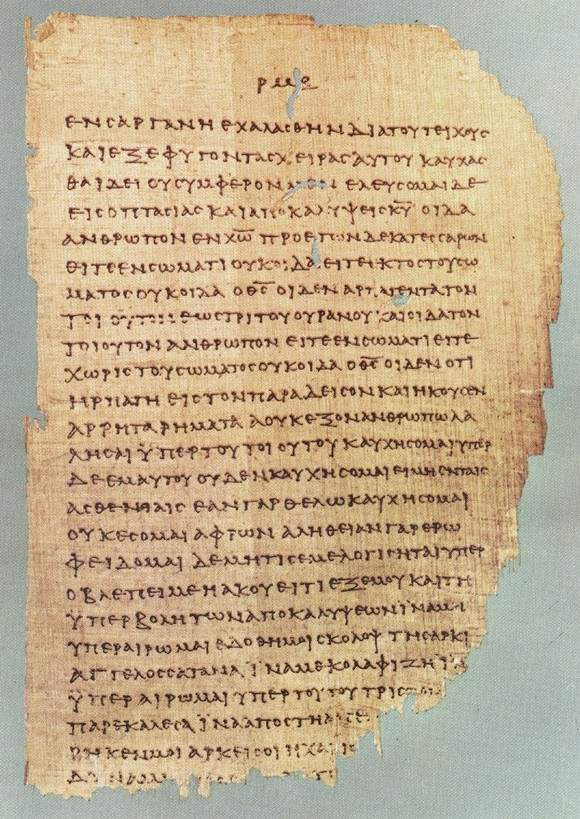
- A folio of Papyrus 46 (written ca. AD 200), containing 2 Corinthians 11:33–12:9. This manuscript contains almost complete parts of the whole Pauline epistles.
- Book: Second Epistle to the Corinthians
- Category: Pauline epistles
- Christian Bible part: New Testament
- Order in the Christian part: 8

2 Corinthians 7 is the seventh chapter of the Second Epistle to the Corinthians in the New Testament of the Christian Bible. It was written by Paul the Apostle and Timothy (2 Corinthians 1:1) in Macedonia in 55–56 CE. Verse 1 is often linked with the preceding chapter and may be part of a later interpolation. Verses 2 onwards continue from Paul's appeal to the Corinthian church in 2 Corinthians 6:11-13 for his authority to be accepted.

== Text ==
The original text was written in Koine Greek. This chapter is divided into 16 verses.

=== Textual witnesses ===
Some early manuscripts containing the text of this chapter are:

- Papyrus 46 (~AD 200)
- Codex Vaticanus (325–350)
- Codex Sinaiticus (330–360)
- Papyrus 117 (4th century; extant verses 6–8,9-11)
- Codex Alexandrinus (400–440)
- Codex Ephraemi Rescriptus (~450)
- Codex Freerianus (~450; extant verses 7–8,13–14)
- Codex Claromontanus (~550).

== Verse 1 ==
The New King James Version and the New International Version, and biblical commentators Johann Bengel and Heinrich Meyer, treat verse 1 as the conclusion of verses 11–18 in the previous chapter:

Therefore, having these promises, beloved, let us cleanse ourselves from all filthiness of the flesh and spirit, perfecting holiness in the fear of God.

Some versions read "brethren" for "beloved", including the Ethiopic version. Baptist theologian John Gill (1697-1771) states that in "these promises", God promises to walk in His temple, dwell in His churches, be their God, and they His people, be their Father, and they His "beloved" sons and daughters (2 Corinthians 6:16–18).

== Verse 2 ==
Receive us: we have wronged no man, we have corrupted no man, we have defrauded no man.

A number of translations say "Make room in your hearts for us", although "in your hearts" is not part of the original text. This, according to St. John Chrysostom and others, repeats previous exhortations, "be enlarged or dilated in heart, that is, have a love, and true charity, and a zeal for us, and for the ministers of the gospel".

== Verses 5-16 ==
The themes of "affliction" and "comfort" introduced in chapter 1 and again in verse 4 here, are further developed in this passage.

=== Verse 6 ===
But God, who comforts the downcast, comforted us by the coming of Titus.

Titus, arriving in Macedonia, brings news that the issues concerning "the offender" who, in 1 Corinthians 5:1, "had his father’s wife", have now been resolved.

== See also ==
- Macedonia
- Titus
- Related Bible parts: John 14, John 15, John 17, Romans 8, Galatians 5

== Sources ==
- MacDonald, Margaret (2007). "66. 2 Corinthians". In Barton, John; Muddiman, John (eds.). The Oxford Bible Commentary (first (paperback) ed.). Oxford University Press. pp. 1134–1151. ISBN 978-0199277186.
