= Severe Letter =

Letter written to the Corinthians by the Apostle Paul

The Severe Letter or Letter of Tears was a letter written to the Corinthians by the Apostle Paul. It is mentioned in 2 Corinthians 2:3-4 and again in 2 Corinthians 7:8:

For out of much affliction and anguish of heart I wrote unto you with many tears, not that ye should be grieved, but that ye might know the love which I have more abundantly for you.

— 2 Corinthians 2:4.

The description does not match First Corinthians, so there are two main theories on the Severe Letter:

1. The first theory is that the Severe Letter is lost.
2. The second theory is that the "Severe Letter" is preserved in 2 Corinthians 10–13.

For more discussion on reconstructing Paul's correspondence with the Corinthians, see Second Epistle to the Corinthians.
