= 2 Corinthians 2 =

- ← chapter 1 chapter 3 →
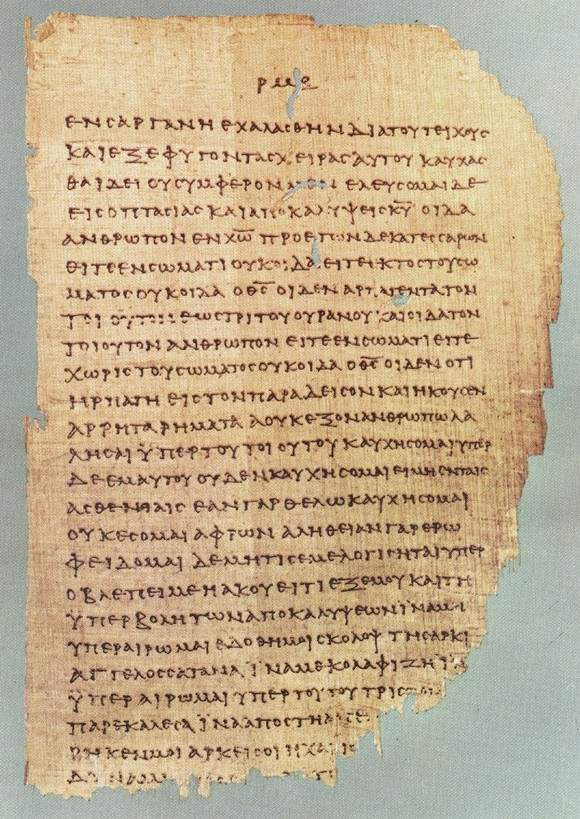
- A folio of Papyrus 46 (written ca. AD 200), containing 2 Corinthians 11:33–12:9. This manuscript contains almost complete parts of the whole Pauline epistles.
- Book: Second Epistle to the Corinthians
- Category: Pauline epistles
- Christian Bible part: New Testament
- Order in the Christian part: 8

2 Corinthians 2 is the second chapter of the Second Epistle to the Corinthians in the New Testament of the Christian Bible. It is authored by Paul the Apostle and Timothy (2 Corinthians 1:1) in Macedonia in 55–56 CE. In this chapter, Paul extends an explanation commenced in chapter 1 as to why he is not visiting Corinth prior to his return journey to Judea.

== Text ==
The original text was written in Koine Greek. This chapter is divided into 17 verses.

=== Textual witnesses ===
Some early manuscripts containing the text of this chapter are:

- Papyrus 46 (~AD 200)
- Codex Vaticanus (325–350)
- Codex Sinaiticus (330–360)
- Codex Alexandrinus (400–440; complete)
- Codex Ephraemi Rescriptus (~450)
- Codex Freerianus (~450; extant verses 3–4, 14)
- Codex Claromontanus (~550).

== Verse 1 ==
So I made up my mind not to make you another painful visit.

This passage is continuous with the final part of chapter 1. Paul refers to an earlier "brief and painful visit", during which a longer visit was promised, which is the subject of the change of mind which he alludes to here.

== Verse 3 ==
I wrote you a letter for this reason: that when I came to you I would not be made sad by the people who should make me happy. I felt sure of all of you, that you would share my joy.

Paul's letter after his "painful visit" is commonly referred to as the "severe letter" or "letter of tears". 2 Corinthians 7:8-12 also refers to this letter.

== Forgive the offender (verses 5-11) ==
For such a one, this punishment by the majority is enough.

The unnamed offender, Biblical Greek: τοιοῦτος, toioutos, "such a one" (KJV), "a man in his position" (J. B. Phillips' translation) is the man who, in 1 Corinthians 5:1 "has his father’s wife".

== Verse 14 ==
But thanks be to God, who always leads us as captives in Christ’s triumphal procession and uses us to spread the aroma of the knowledge of him everywhere.

MacDonald suggests that the thanksgiving formula in this verse acts as the starting point for a section running to 2 Corinthians 5:19 which deals with Paul's authority as an apostle.

== Verse 16 ==
To the one we are the aroma of death leading to death, and to the other the aroma of life leading to life. And who is sufficient for these things?

- "Leading to death" (NKJV; KJV: "unto death"): or "for death", "appointed to" death (cf. Jeremiah 43:11).

== Verse 17 ==
For we are not, as so many, peddling the word of God; but as of sincerity, but as from God, we speak in the sight of God in Christ.

- "We are not, as so many": Paul separates himself from the false apostles, who are "many", forming "great swarms of false teachers" in the early times of Christianity (cf. 1 John 2:18; 1 John 4:1). Some copies read, "as the rest", as the Syriac and Arabic versions.
- "Peddling the word of God" (KJV: which corrupt the word of God): that is the Scriptures in general may be corrupted by "false glosses and human mixtures". The Septuagint translates the last clause of Isaiah 1:22 oi kaphloi sou misgousi ton (oinon udati, "thy vintners mix wine with water"), in a moral or spiritual sense. The Syriac version reads the words Nygzmmd, "who mix the word of God".
- "We speak ... in Christ": which is "in the name of Christ, of or concerning him, and him only".

== See also ==
- Jesus Christ
- Macedonia
- Titus
- Troas
- Related Bible parts: 2 Corinthians 1, 1 John 2, 1 John 4

== Bibliography ==
- MacDonald, Margaret (2007). "66. 2 Corinthians". In Barton, John; Muddiman, John (eds.). The Oxford Bible Commentary (first (paperback) ed.). Oxford University Press. pp. 1134–1151. ISBN 978-0199277186.
