= Papyrus 117 =

- New Testament manuscript
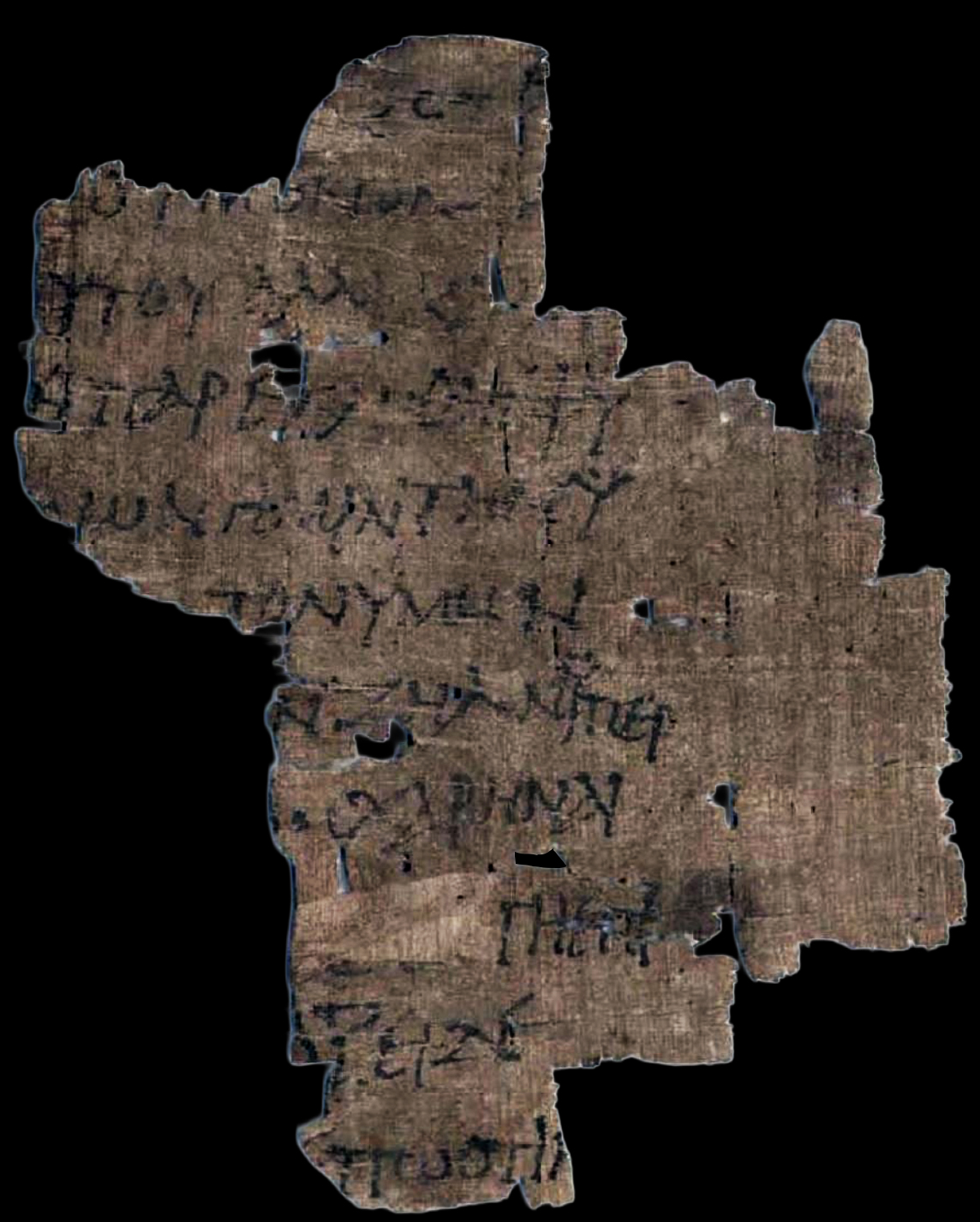
- Recto, 2 Corinthians 7:6-8
- Sign: 𝔓^{117}
- Text: Second Epistle to the Corinthians 7:6-8,9-11
- Date: 4th / 5th-century
- Script: Greek
- Now at: University of Hamburg
- Cite: M. Salvo, Un nuovo frammento della seconda lettera di Paolo ai Corinzi Analecta papyrologica 13 (2001), pp. 19-21
- Size: 15 x 11 cm
- Type: ?
- Category: ?

Papyrus 117 (in the Gregory-Aland numbering), designated by siglum 𝔓^{117}, is a copy of a small part of the New Testament in Greek. It is a papyrus manuscript of the Second Epistle to the Corinthians. The surviving texts of 2 Corinthians are verses 7:6-8,9-11. They are in a fragmentary condition.

The text is written in one column per page, in 11 lines per page.

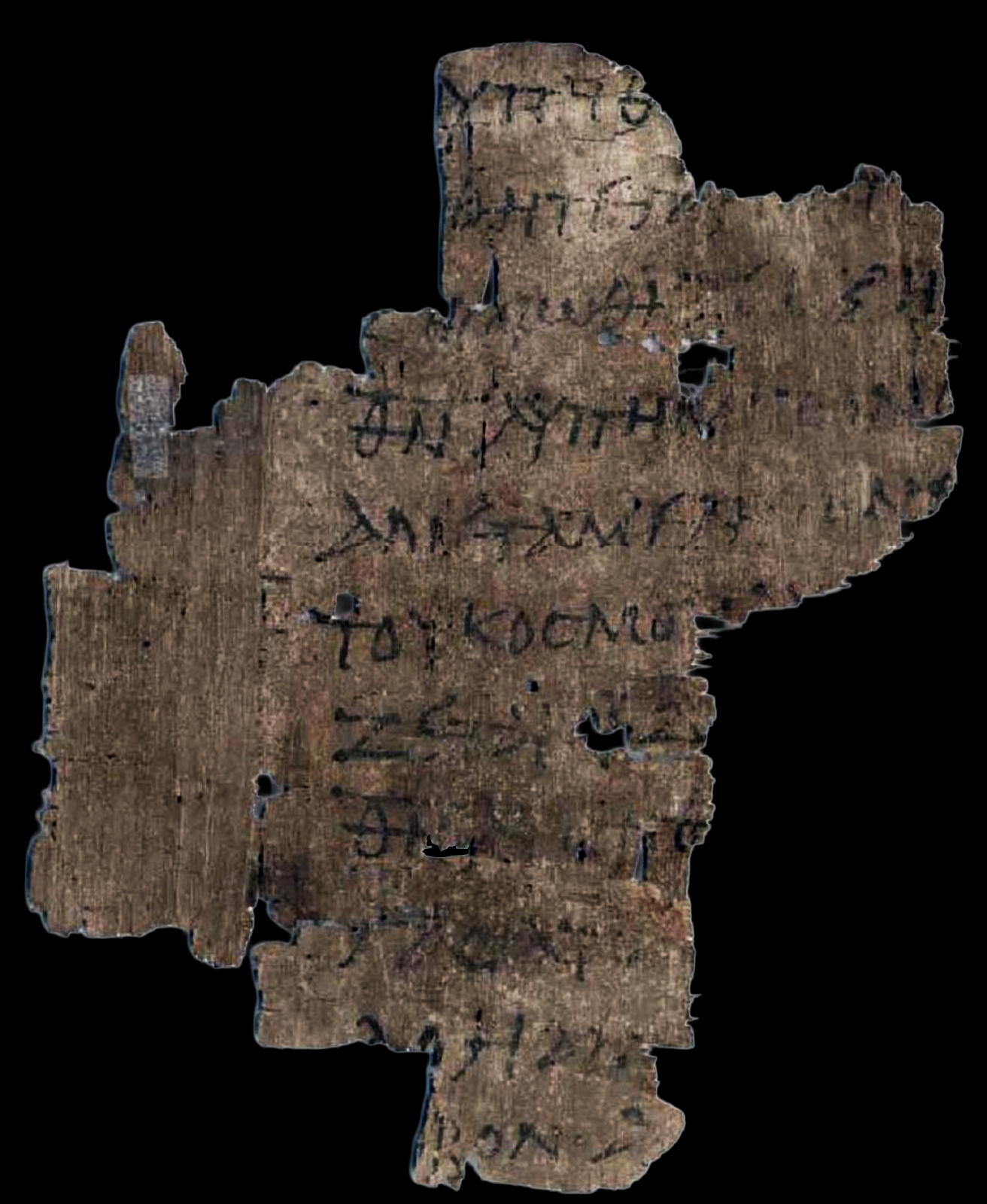
Verso, 2 Corinthians 7:9-11

The manuscript palaeographically has been assigned by the INTF to the 4th-century (or 5th-century).

Location

The codex currently is housed at the library of the University of Hamburg at Hamburg with the shelf number Inv. NS 1002.

== See also ==
- List of New Testament papyri
- Second Epistle to the Corinthians: chapter 7
