= MICOS13 =

Protein-coding gene in the species Homo sapiens

Identifiers
- Aliases: MICOS13, P117, QIL1, MIC13, chromosome 19 open reading frame 70, mitochondrial contact site and cristae organizing system subunit 13, C19orf70, MIC12
- External IDs: OMIM: 616658; MGI: 2442174; GeneCards: MICOS13

Gene location (Human)
| Chr. | Chromosome 19 (human) |
| Band | 19p13.3 | Start | 5,678,421 bp |
| Band | 19p13.3 | End | 5,680,516 bp |

Gene location (Mouse)
| Chr. | Chromosome 17 (mouse) |
| Band | 17|17 D | Start | 56,914,452 bp |
| Band | 17|17 D | End | 56,916,771 bp |
RNA expression pattern
| Bgee | Human / Mouse (ortholog); Top expressed in: apex of heart; left testis; right auricle of heart; right testis; left ventricle; muscle of thigh; gastrocnemius muscle; mucosa of transverse colon; cingulate gyrus; anterior cingulate cortex / Top expressed in: right kidney; brown adipose tissue; intercostal muscle; yolk sac; human kidney; lip; transitional epithelium of urinary bladder; interventricular septum; lobe of prostate; pyloric antrum; More reference expression data |
| BioGPS | n/a |
Orthologs
| Databases | NCBI: entry; OMA: entry |
| Species | Human | Mouse |
| Entrez | 125988 | 224904 |
| Ensembl | ENSG00000174917 | ENSMUSG00000049760 |
| UniProt | Q5XKP0 | Q8R404 |
| RefSeq (mRNA) | NM_001308240; NM_205767; NM_001365761 | NM_153152 |
| RefSeq (protein) | NP_001295169; NP_991330; NP_001352690 | NP_694792 |
| Location (UCSC) | Chr 19: 5.68 – 5.68 Mb | Chr 17: 56.91 – 56.92 Mb |
| PubMed search |
- Wikidata
| View/Edit Human | View/Edit Mouse |

MICOS complex subunit MIC13, is a protein that in humans is encoded by the MICOS13 gene (previously C19orf70). The MICOS13 protein is part of the MICOS complex, a mitochondrial protein complex which is involved in formation and maintenance of crista junctions.

== Structure ==
The MICOS13 gene is located on the p arm of chromosome 19 at position 13.3 and it spans 2,482 base pairs. The MICOS13 gene produces a 9.7 kDa protein composed of 88 amino acids.

== Function ==
The MICOS13 gene encodes for a subunit of the MICOS (mitochondrial contact site and cristae junction organizing system) complex of the mitochondrial inner membrane. The 700-kD complex plays diverse roles such as the maintenance of crista junctions, formation of contact junctions to the outer membrane, and the dynamic regulation of mitochondrial membrane architecture. MICOS13, a component of the mature MICOS complex, localizes to the inner mitochondrial membrane at the cristae junctions and incorporates MINOS1 and MIC10 into the MICOS complex. The protein is necessary for the creation of the cristae junction, integrity of the cristae junction, and maintenance of cristae morphology. It is also essential for normal mitochondrial function.

== Clinical significance ==
Mutations in MICOS13 has been shown to result in mitochondrial deficiencies and related disorders caused by the disassembly of MICOS complex with abnormal cristae morphology and failure of mitochondrial respiration. Major clinical manifestations have included mitochondrial hepato-encephalopathy and 3-methylglutaconic aciduria accompanied by severe psychomotor retardation, intractable seizures, cerebellar atrophy, early death, Lactic acidemia, neutropenia, and elevated liver transaminases.

== Interactions ==
MICOS13 has been known to interact with MRPL24, APOOL, STOML2, IMMT, MTX1, CHCHD3, and other proteins.
