= Codex Tischendorfianus II =

Uncial 081, 0285
- New Testament manuscript
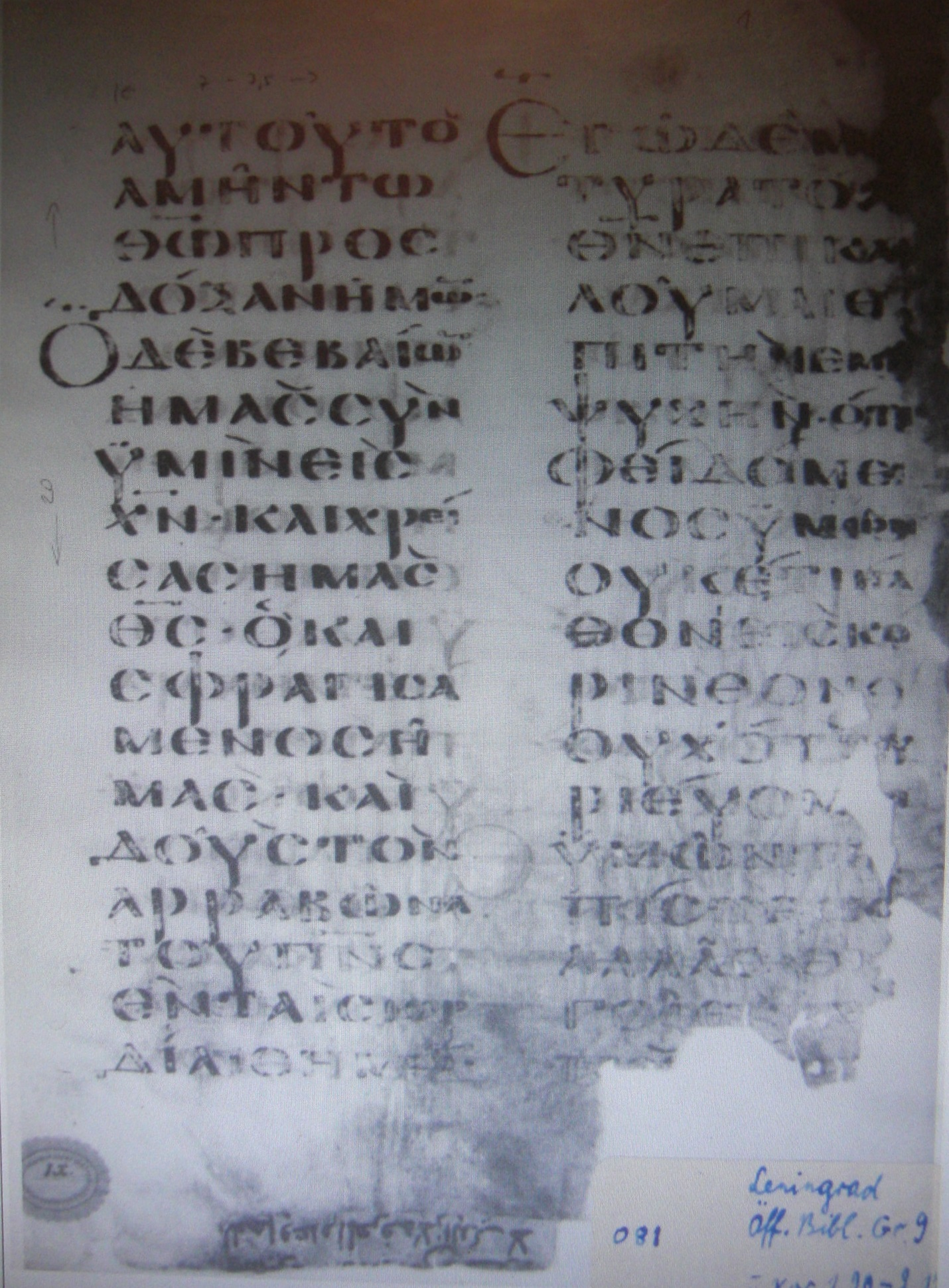
- Fragment with text of 2 Cor 1:20-24
- Name: Tischendorfianus II
- Text: 2 Cor 1:20-2:12
- Date: 6th century
- Script: Greek
- Found: 1859, Tischendorf
- Now at: Russian National Library
- Size: 28 x 23 cm
- Type: Alexandrian text-type
- Category: II
- Hand: elegantly written

Codex Tischendorfianus II – designated by Uncial 081 (in the Gregory-Aland numbering) α 1023 (Soden), – is a Greek uncial manuscript of the New Testament, dated paleographically to the 6th century.

== Description ==
The codex contains a small part of the Second Epistle to the Corinthians 1:20-2:12 on 2 parchment leaves (28 centimetres (11 in) by 23 centimetres (9.1 in)). The text is written in two columns per page, 18 lines per page, in a large uncial letters. It is elegantly written, without breathings and accents. It uses diaeresis (Ϊ and Ϋ).

This manuscript was a part of the same codex to which Uncial 0285 belonged.

The Greek text of this codex was influenced by the Alexandrian text-type with some alien readings. Aland placed it in Category II.

In 2 Corinthians 2:2 it contains reading και τις εστιν (as א^{2} D F G Ψ) for και τις (as א* A B C 81).

== History ==
Biblical scholar Constantin von Tischendorf brought this codex from the East to Petersburg in 1859. Tischendorf briefly described it in Notitia editionis codicis Bibliorum Sinaitici (Leipzig, 1860). It was examined by Eduard de Muralt, by Kurt Treu and by Pasquale Orsini.

Currently it is dated by the INTF to the 6th century.

The codex is now located at the Russian National Library (Gr. 9) in Saint Petersburg.

== See also ==
- List of New Testament uncials
- Biblical manuscript
- Textual criticism
