= Uncial 0285 =

- New Testament manuscript
- Text: Pauline epistles † 1 Peter
- Date: 6th century
- Script: Greek
- Found: 1975
- Now at: Saint Catherine's Monastery; Russian National Library
- Size: 29 cm by 19.5 cm
- Type: Alexandrian text-type
- Category: II

Uncial 0285 (in the Gregory-Aland numbering), is a Greek uncial manuscript of the New Testament. Paleographically it has been assigned to the 6th century.

== Description ==
The codex contains the text of the Pauline epistles and 1 Peter with numerous lacunae, on 20 parchment leaves (29 cm by 19.5 cm). The text is written in two columns per page, 18 lines per page, in uncial letters. The leaves have survived in a fragmentary condition.

Romans 5:12.14; 8:37-9:5; 13:1-4; 13:11-14:3; 1 Corinthians 4:2-7; 12:16.18.21-30; 14:26-33; Ephesians 3:13-20; 5:28-6:1; 1 Timothy 1:1-7; Hebrews 8:9-9:1; 9:25-10:2; 11:3-7; 12:22-13:25; 1 Peter 3:17-4:1.

The Greek text of the codex is a representative of the Alexandrian text-type.

Currently it is dated by the INTF to the 6th century.

== Location ==
It is one of the manuscripts discovered in Saint Catherine's Monastery at Sinai in May 1975, during the restoration work. Currently the codex is housed at the St. Catherine's Monastery (N.E. ΜΓ 70) in Sinai.

This manuscript was part of the same codex to which Uncial 081 belonged. 081 was brought to Russia in the 1859 by Tischendorf and it is housed at the Russian National Library (Gr. 9,2) in Saint Petersburg.

== See also ==
- List of New Testament uncials
- Biblical manuscript
- Textual criticism
