= MTX1 =

Protein found in humans

Identifiers
- Aliases: MTX1, MTX, MTXN, metaxin 1
- External IDs: OMIM: 600605; MGI: 103025; GeneCards: MTX1

Gene location (Human)
Chr.	Chromosome 1 (human)
Band	1q22	Start	155,208,695 bp
Band	1q22	End	155,213,824 bp

Gene location (Mouse)
Chr.	Chromosome 3 (mouse)
Band	3 F1|3 39.01 cM	Start	89,116,388 bp
Band	3 F1|3 39.01 cM	End	89,134,395 bp
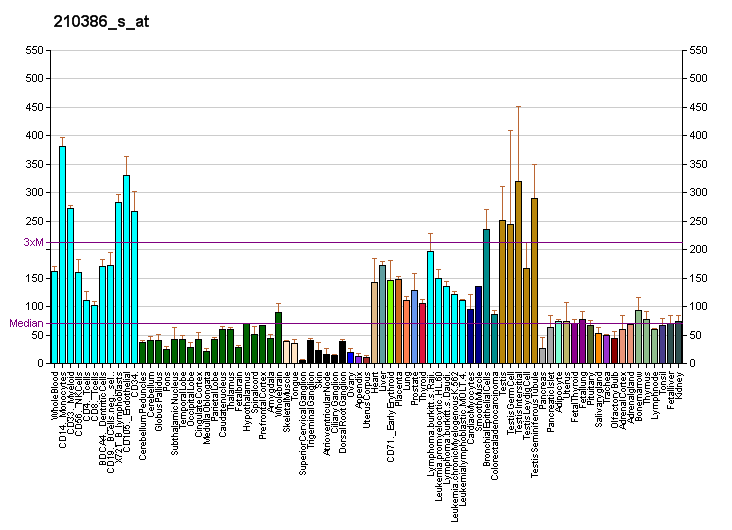
RNA expression pattern
Bgee	Human / Mouse (ortholog); Top expressed in: right testis; left testis; blood; mucosa of transverse colon; stromal cell of endometrium; olfactory zone of nasal mucosa; granulocyte; right uterine tube; right adrenal gland; right adrenal cortex / Top expressed in: fossa; condyle; seminiferous tubule; yolk sac; spermatid; spermatocyte; submandibular gland; Paneth cell; right kidney; tibiofemoral joint; More reference expression data
BioGPS	More reference expression data
Orthologs
Databases	NCBI: entry; OMA: entry
Species	Human	Mouse
Entrez	4580	17827
Ensembl	ENSG00000173171	ENSMUSG00000064068
UniProt	Q13505	P47802
RefSeq (mRNA)	NM_002455; NM_198883	NM_001161824; NM_013604; NM_001357367
RefSeq (protein)	NP_002446; NP_942584	n/a
Location (UCSC)	Chr 1: 155.21 – 155.21 Mb	Chr 3: 89.12 – 89.13 Mb
PubMed search
- Wikidata
View/Edit Human	View/Edit Mouse

Metaxin 1, also known as MTX1, is a protein which in humans is encoded by the MTX1 gene.

== Function ==
The metaxin gene, which encodes a protein located on the outer membrane of mitochondria, is a component of the mitochondrial protein translocation apparatus.
