= Thessalonians =

Thessalonians may refer to:

- People of Thessaloniki, in Greece
- Thessalonian Jews
- The two Pauline epistles to the people of Thessaloniki:
  - First Epistle to the Thessalonians
  - Second Epistle to the Thessalonians
- Thessalonians (band), a mid 1980s San Francisco experimental noise band founded by Larry Thrasher and Kim Cascone
