= 2 Corinthians 1 =

- ← 1 Corinthians 16 chapter 2 →
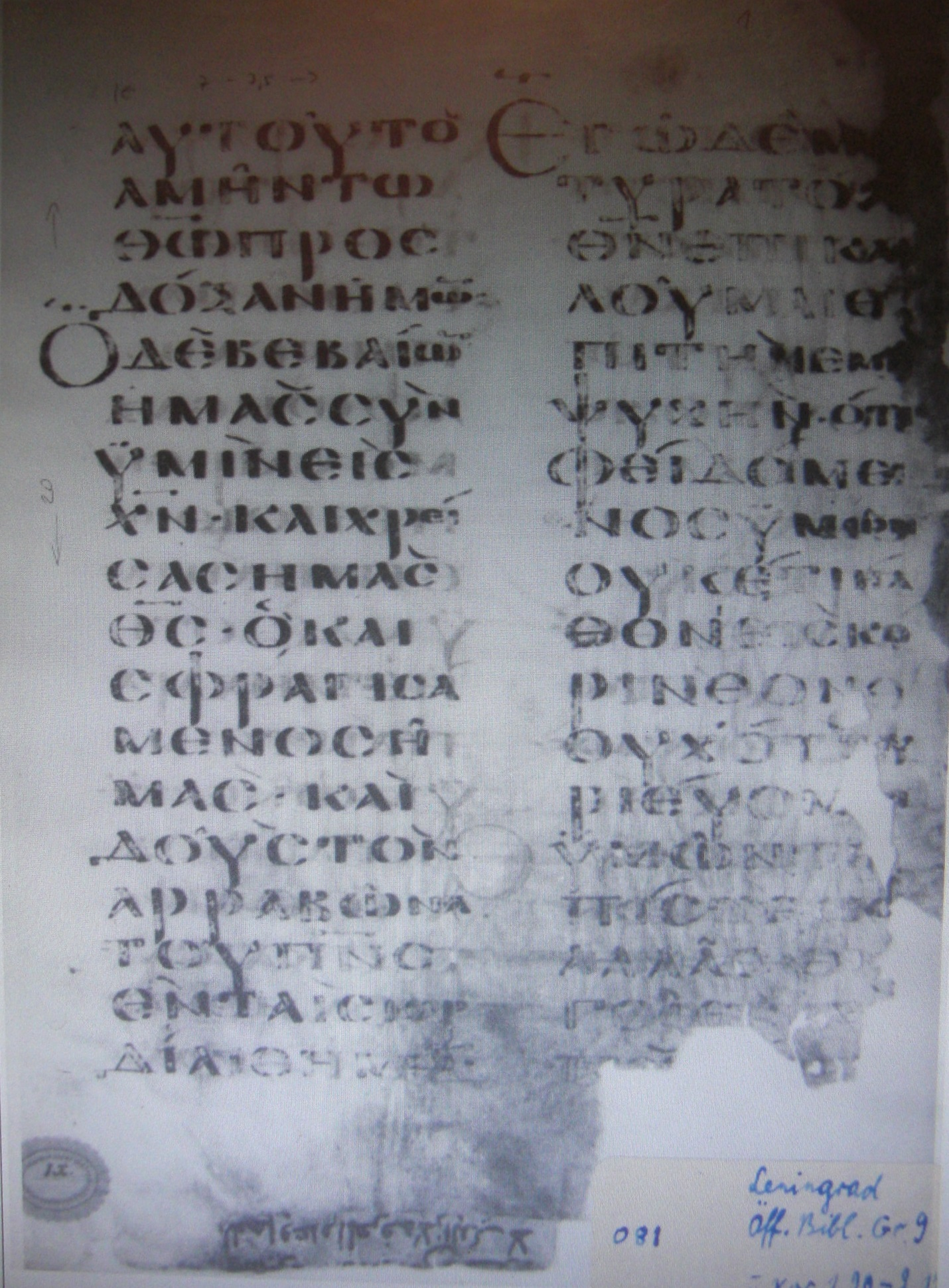
- Text of 2 Corinthians 1:20–24 on Uncial 081 or Codex Tischendorfianus II, written in 6th century.
- Book: Second Epistle to the Corinthians
- Category: Pauline epistles
- Christian Bible part: New Testament
- Order in the Christian part: 8

Corinth and Macedonia in the Mediterranean

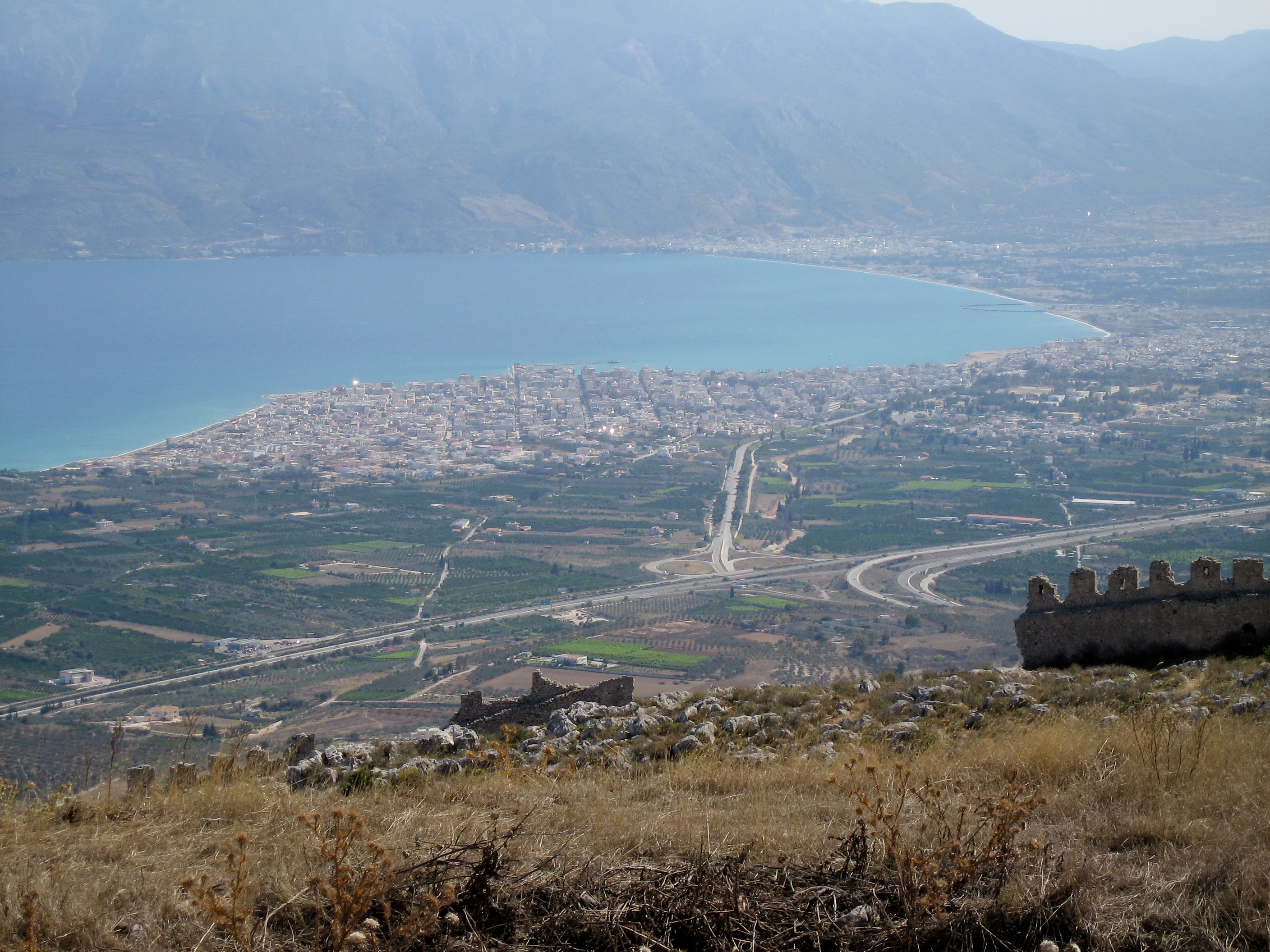
The city of Corinth, from the summit of Acrocorinth (2007)

2 Corinthians 1 is the first chapter of the Second Epistle to the Corinthians in the New Testament of the Christian Bible. It was sent by Paul the Apostle and Timothy (2 Corinthians 1:1) to the Corinthian church around 55–56 CE.

== Text ==
The original text was written in Koine Greek. This chapter is divided into 24 verses. Some early manuscripts containing the text of this chapter are:

- Papyrus 46 (~AD 200)
- Codex Vaticanus (325–350)
- Codex Sinaiticus (330–360)
- Codex Alexandrinus (400–440; complete)
- Codex Ephraemi Rescriptus (~450; extant verses 3–24)
- Codex Freerianus (~450; extant verses 1, 9, 16–17)
- Codex Claromontanus (~550).

== Greetings ==
=== Verse 1 ===
Paul, an apostle of Jesus Christ by the will of God, and Timothy our brother,

To the church of God which is at Corinth, with all the saints who are in all Achaia:

Timothy's name is also associated with Paul's name in the Epistles to the Philippians, Colossians, both of those written to the Thessalonians, and in that to Philemon.

Protestant commentator Heinrich Meyer argues that "the saints who were in all Achaia" lived around the wider region but attached themselves to the Corinthian church, the "sole seat" of a church in the region. Hugo Grotius had argued in his Annotationes in Novum Testamentum ("Commentaries on the New Testament", 1641–50) that the letter was intended to be sent on to "the churches in Achaia". Meyer argues that Paul would have said "to the churches" rather than "to the saints" if that had been the case.

== Preface or blessing (verses 3-11) ==
Themes of "affliction" and "comfort" are dominant in these verses.

Paul's introduction to his letter begins in 2 Corinthians 1:3 with a thanksgiving to God the "father of mercies" (Ancient Greek: ο πατηρ των οικτιρμων, ho pater tov oiktirmon), a Jewish term frequently used in prayer. The plural ('mercies') generates a strong sense of God's many mercies alongside God's merciful nature; James uses a similar expression, the father of lights (Ancient Greek: ο πατηρ των φωτων, ho pater tov photon), in James 1:17.

== Sparing the Church (verses 12-24) ==
Paul outlines his aborted plans to travel to Corinth on his way to Macedonia, return to Corinth and then travel to Judea. The letter does not indicate where he is writing from, or would have been travelling from. Easton's Bible Dictionary suggests "it was probably written at Philippi, or, as some think, Thessalonica". Margaret MacDonald suggests that chapters 1-9 were composed in Macedonia.

=== Verse 20 ===
For all the promises of God in Him are Yes, and in Him Amen, to the glory of God through us.

- "All the promises of God in Him are Yes" ("yea" in King James Version): the first 5 words may be rendered, "as many promises of God", and these promises are all "in" Christ, with and in whom they were made. Moreover, these promises are "in Him [are] yea".
- "And in Him Amen": that is, like Christ himself, who is "the amen, the true and faithful witness, the same today, yesterday, and for ever."
- "The glory of God through us": When the promises are received "by us", the believers in Christ, the more glory is given to God. The Syriac version has the "Amen" in the last clause, reading: "therefore by him we give Amen to the glory of God".

=== Verse 21 ===
Now the one who establishes us together with you in Christ and who anoints us is God,

=== Verse 22 ===
who also has sealed us and given us the Spirit in our hearts as a guarantee.

Cross reference: Ephesians 1:13

Moreover I call God as witness against my soul, that to spare you I came no more to Corinth.

This verse is highlighted in the section heading which the New King James Version applies to verses 15-24.

== See also ==
- Achaia
- Jesus Christ
- Judea
- Macedonia
- Paul of Tarsus
- Silvanus
- Timothy
- Other related Bible parts: 1 Corinthians 1, Revelation 3

== Sources ==
- MacDonald, Margaret (2007). "66. 2 Corinthians". In Barton, John; Muddiman, John (eds.). The Oxford Bible Commentary (first (paperback) ed.). Oxford University Press. pp. 1134–1151. ISBN 978-0199277186.
