= Saint Titus =

Greek saint

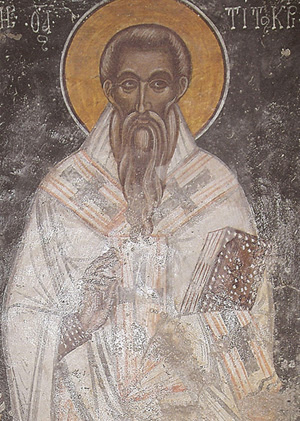

Bishop and Companion of Paul
- Born: 1st century
- Died: 96 or 107; Gortyn, Crete and Cyrenaica, Roman Empire
- Venerated in: Eastern Orthodox Church; Oriental Orthodox churches Roman Catholic Church; Lutheranism; Anglican Communion
- Canonized: Pre-congregation
- Major shrine: Heraklion, Crete
- Feast: 25 August (Orthodoxy); 26 January (Catholicism); Thursday after fifth Sunday after feast of the Holy Cross (Armenian Apostolic Church)
- Patronage: Crete

Titus (/ˈtaɪtəs/ TY-təs; Ancient Greek: Τίτος, Títos) was an early Christian missionary and church leader, a companion and disciple of Paul the Apostle, mentioned in several of the Pauline epistles including the Epistle to Titus. He is believed to be a Gentile converted to Christianity by Paul and, according to tradition, he was consecrated as Bishop of the Island of Crete.

Titus brought a fundraising letter from Paul to Corinth, to collect for the poor in Jerusalem. According to Jerome, Titus was the amanuensis of this epistle (2 Corinthians). Later, on Crete, Titus appointed presbyters (elders) in every city and remained there into his old age, dying in Gortyna.

== Life ==
Titus was a Greek, who may have studied Greek philosophy and poetry in his early years. He seems to have been converted by Paul, whereupon he served as Paul's secretary and interpreter. In the year 48 or 49 AD, Titus accompanied Paul to the council held at Jerusalem, on the subject of the Mosaic rites.

In the fall of 55 or 56 AD, Paul, as he himself departed from Asia, sent Titus from Ephesus to Corinth, with full commission to remedy the fallout precipitated by Timothy's delivery of 1 Corinthians and Paul's "Painful Visit", particularly a significant personal offense and challenge to Paul's authority by one unnamed individual. During this journey, Titus served as the courier for what is commonly known as the "Severe Letter", a Pauline missive that has been lost but is referred to in 2 Corinthians 7:8–9.

After success on this mission, Titus journeyed north and met Paul in Macedonia. There the apostle, overjoyed by Titus' success, wrote 2 Corinthians. Titus then returned to Corinth with a larger entourage, carrying 2 Corinthians with him. Paul joined Titus in Corinth later. From Corinth, Paul then sent Titus to organize the collections of alms for the Christians at Jerusalem. Titus was therefore a troubleshooter, peacemaker, ecclesiastical administrator, and missionary.

Early church tradition holds that Paul, after his release from his first imprisonment in Rome, stopped at the island of Crete to preach. Due to the needs of other churches, requiring his presence elsewhere, he ordained his disciple Titus as bishop of that island, and left him to finish the work he had started. John Chrysostom says that this is an indication of the esteem Paul held for Titus.

Paul summoned Titus from Crete to join him at Nicopolis in Epirus. Later, Titus traveled to Dalmatia. The New Testament does not record his death.

== Possible identification with Timothy ==
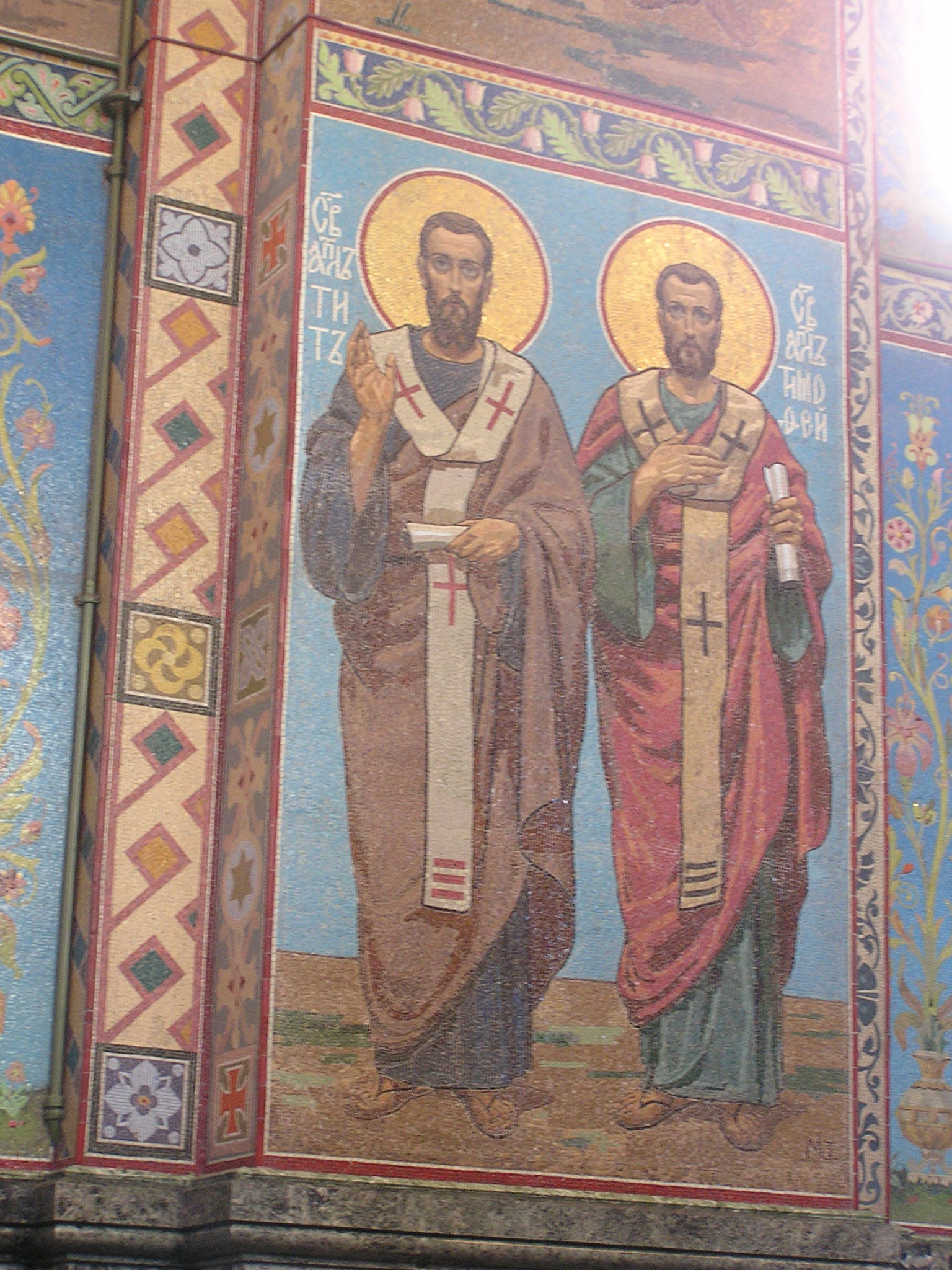
Titus and Timothy as separate individuals, in a mosaic in the Church of the Savior on Blood

It has been argued that the name "Titus" in 2 Corinthians and Galatians was an informal name used by Timothy, a view circumstantially supported by the fact that both are said to be long-term close companions of Paul, even though they never appear together in these books. The theory proposes that a number of passages (1 Corinthians 4:17, 16.10; 2 Corinthians 2:13, 7:6, 13–14, 12:18; and Acts 19.22) refer to the same journey of a single individual, variously called Titus and Timothy. In support of this position, some draw on the fourth-century commentaries of Gaius Marius Victorinus.

== Veneration ==
Titus was venerated as a saint earlier than 261 CE. The feast day of Titus was not included in the Tridentine calendar. When added in 1854, it was assigned to 6 February. In 1969, the Catholic Church assigned the feast to 26 January so as to celebrate the two disciples of Paul, Titus and Timothy, the day after the feast of the Conversion of St. Paul. The Evangelical Lutheran Church in America celebrates these two, together with Silas, on the same date while he is honored on the calendars of the Church of England and Episcopal Church (with Timothy) on 26 January.

The Eastern Orthodox Church commemorates Titus on 25 August and on 4 January. His relics, now consisting of only his skull, are venerated in the Church of St. Titus, Heraklion, Crete, to which it was returned in 1966 after being removed to Venice during the period of Ottoman Crete (1667–1898).

Titus is the patron saint of the United States Army Chaplain Corps. The Corps has established the Order of Titus Award, described by the Department of Defense:

Order of Titus award is the only award presented by the Chief of Chaplains to recognize outstanding performance of ministry by chaplains and chaplain assistants. The Order of Titus is awarded for meritorious contributions to the unique and highly visible Unit Ministry Team Observer Controller Program. The award recognizes the great importance of realistic, doctrinally guided combat ministry training in ensuring the delivery of prevailing religious support to the American Soldier.

== See also ==
- Epistle of Pseudo-Titus
