= Codex Freerianus =

Uncial 016
- New Testament manuscript
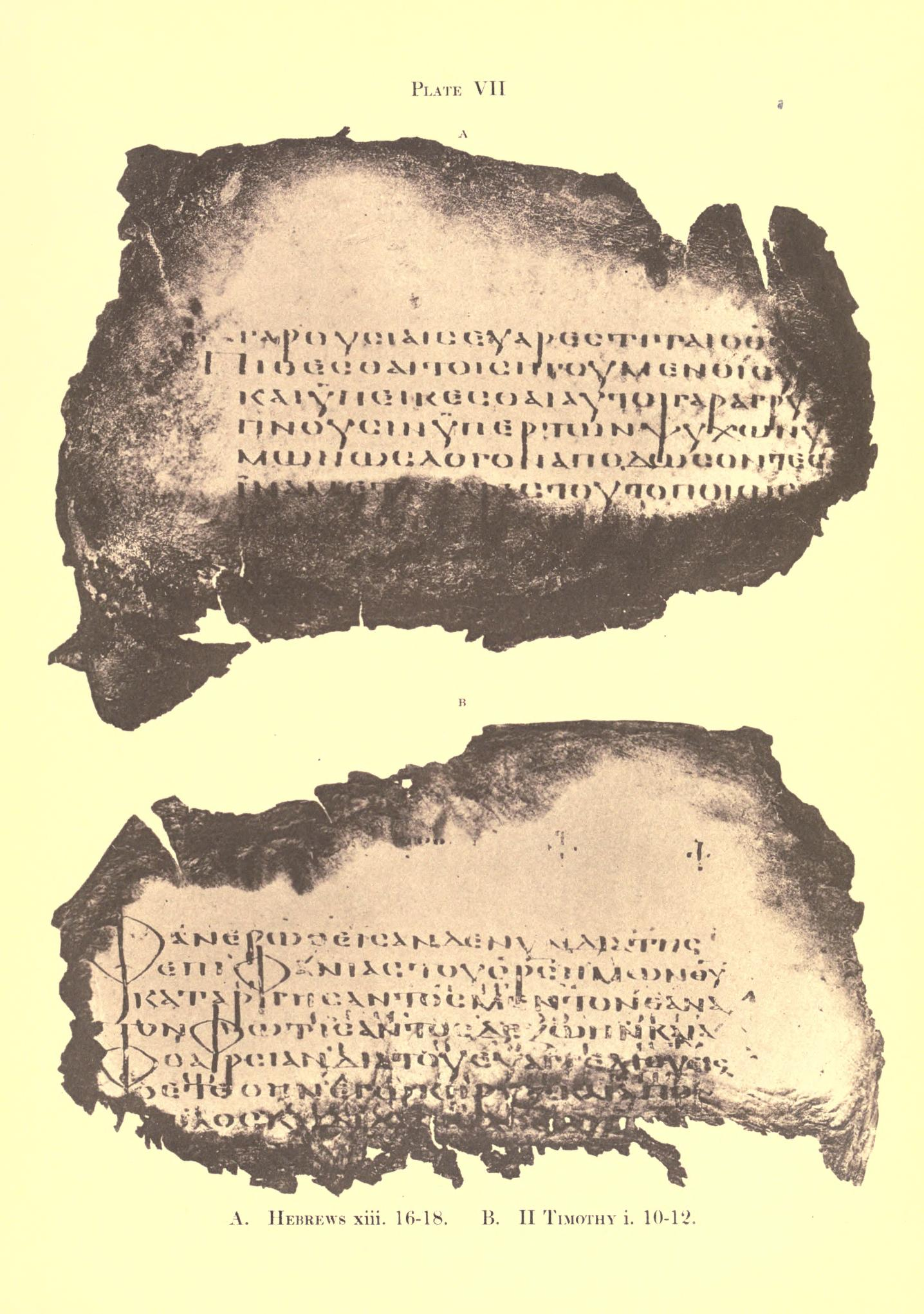
- Name: Freerianus
- Sign: I
- Text: Pauline epistles, Hebrews
- Date: c. 450
- Script: Greek
- Found: Egypt (purchased by Charles Lang Freer)
- Now at: Smithsonian Institution
- Size: 25 cm by 20 cm
- Type: Alexandrian text-type
- Category: II

Codex Freerianus, designated by I or 016 (in the Gregory-Aland numbering), α 1041 (von Soden), also called the Washington Manuscript of the Pauline Epistles, is a 5th-century manuscript in an uncial hand on vellum in Greek.

It is named after Charles Lang Freer, who purchased it in Egypt. The Codex is now located in the Freer Gallery of Art at the Smithsonian Institution in Washington, with the shelf number 06.275.

According to Guglielmo Cavallo, 016 comes from the Nitrian Desert.

== Contents ==
1 Corinthians 10:29, 11:9-10. 18-19. 26-27; 12:3-4. 27-28; 14:12-13. 22.32-33; 15:3.15.27-28.38-39.49-50; 16:1-2.12-13;
2 Corinthians 1:1.9.16-17; 2:3-4.14; 3:6-7.16-17; 4:6-7.16-17; 5:8-10.17-18; 6:6-8.16-18; 7:7-8.13-14; 8:6-7.14-17; 8:24-9:1; 9:7-8; 9:15-10:1; 10:8-10; 10:17-11:2; 11:9-10.20-21.28-29; 12:6-7.14-15; 13:1-2.10-11;
Galatians 1:1-3.11-13, 1:22-2:1, 2:8-9, 16-17, 3:6-8, 16-17, 24-28, 4:8-10, 20-23;
Ephesians 2:15-18, 3:6-8.18-20; 4:9-11, 17-19, 28-30, 5:6-11, 20-24, 5:32-6:1, 6:10-12, 19-21;
Philippians 1:1-4, 11-13, 20-23, 2:1-3, 12-14, 25-27, 3:4-6, 14-17, 4:3-6, 13-15;
Colossians 1:1-4, 10-12, 20-22, 27-29, 2:7-9, 16-19, 3:5-8, 15-17, 3:25-4:2, 4:11-13;
1 Thessalonians 1:1-2, 9-10, 2:7-9, 14-16, 3:2-5, 11-13, 4:7-10, 4:16-5:1, 5:9-12, 23-27;
2 Thessalonians 1:1-3, 10-11, 2:5-8, 14-17, 3:8-10;
Hebrews 1:1-3. 9-12; 2:4-7.12-14; 3:4-6.14-16; 4:3-6.12-14; 5:5-7; 6:1-3.10-13; 6:20-7:2; 7:7-11.18-20; 7:27-8:1; 8:7-9; 9:1-4.9-11.16-19. 25-27; 10:5-8.16-18.26-29.35-38; 11:6-7.12-15.22-24.31-33; 11:38-12:1; 12:7-9.16-18.25-27; 13:7-9.16-18.23-25;
1 Timothy 1:1-3.10-13; 1:19-2:1; 2:9-13; 3:7-9; 4:1-3.10-13; 5:5-9.16-19; 6:1-2.9-11.17-19;
2 Timothy 1:1-3.10-12; 2:2-5.14-16.22-24; 3:6-8; 3:16-4:1; 4:8-10.18-20;
Titus 1:1-3.10-11; 2:4-6.14-15; 3:8-9;
Philemon 1-3. 14-16.

== Description ==
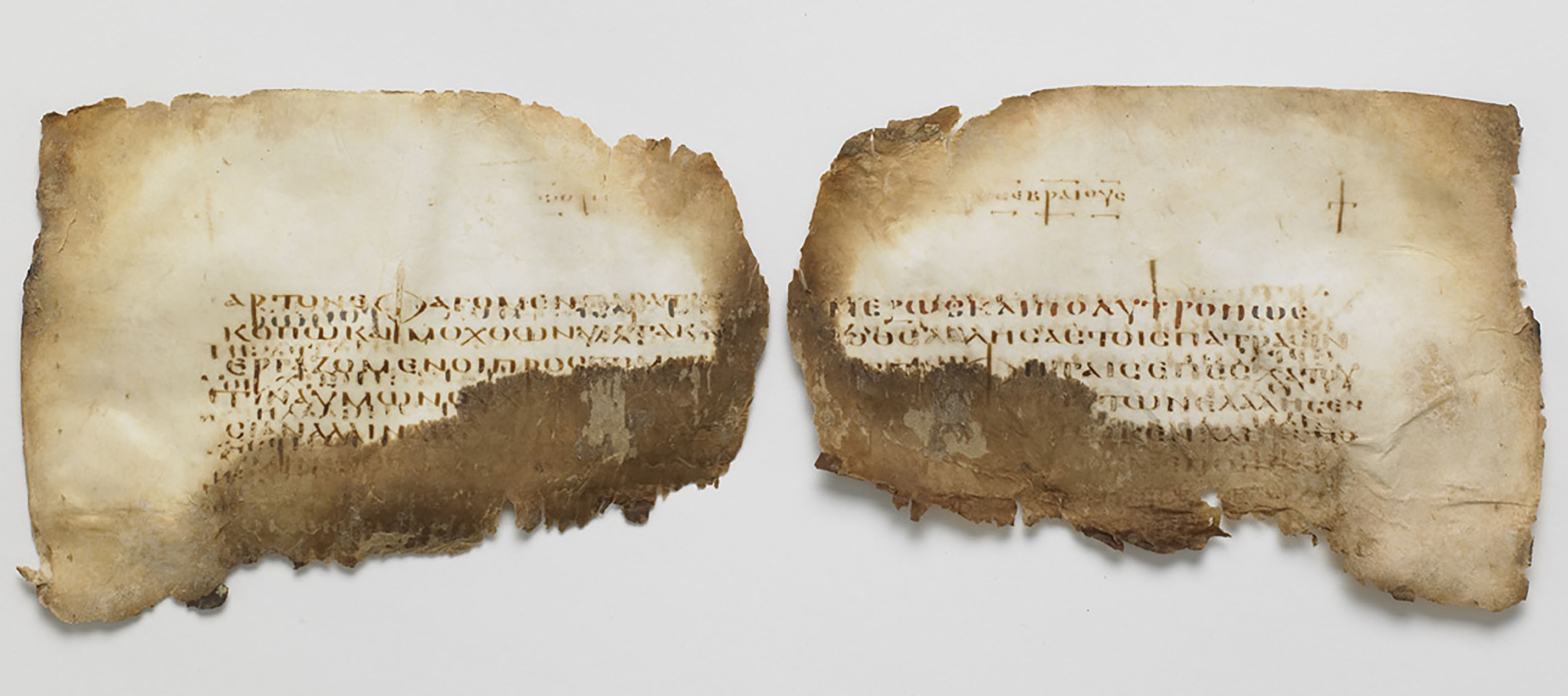
Fragment of the Epistle to the Hebrews

The codex contains portions of the Pauline epistles except Romans. It contains the Epistle to the Hebrews. The Hebrews follows 2 Thessalonians. The manuscript is generally dated from the fifth century, though a few have suggested the sixth century instead. The codex originally contained about 210 parchment leaves (25 cm by 20 cm), of which only 84 survive in a fragmentary condition. The text of the codex contains many lacunae. It was written in one column per page, 30 lines per column. The letters and words are not separated from one another, as it is in scriptio-continua.

The Greek text of this codex, which was edited by H. A. Sanders in 1921, is a good representative of the Alexandrian text-type, agreeing more closely with א, A, C, and 33, than with P^{46}, B or 1739. Aland placed it in Category II, ascribing it to the Egyptian text. Its fragmentary nature limits its usefulness.

In 2 Timothy 1:11 it reads καὶ διδάσκαλος (and teacher) along with א*, A, 1175, syr^{pal}; the majority of manuscripts read καὶ διδάσκαλος ἐθνῶν (and teacher of nations).

== See also ==
- List of New Testament uncials
- Biblical Manuscripts in the Freer Collection
- Textual criticism
- Codex Washingtonianus
- Washington Manuscript of the Psalms
