= Second Epistle to the Corinthians =

Book of the New Testament

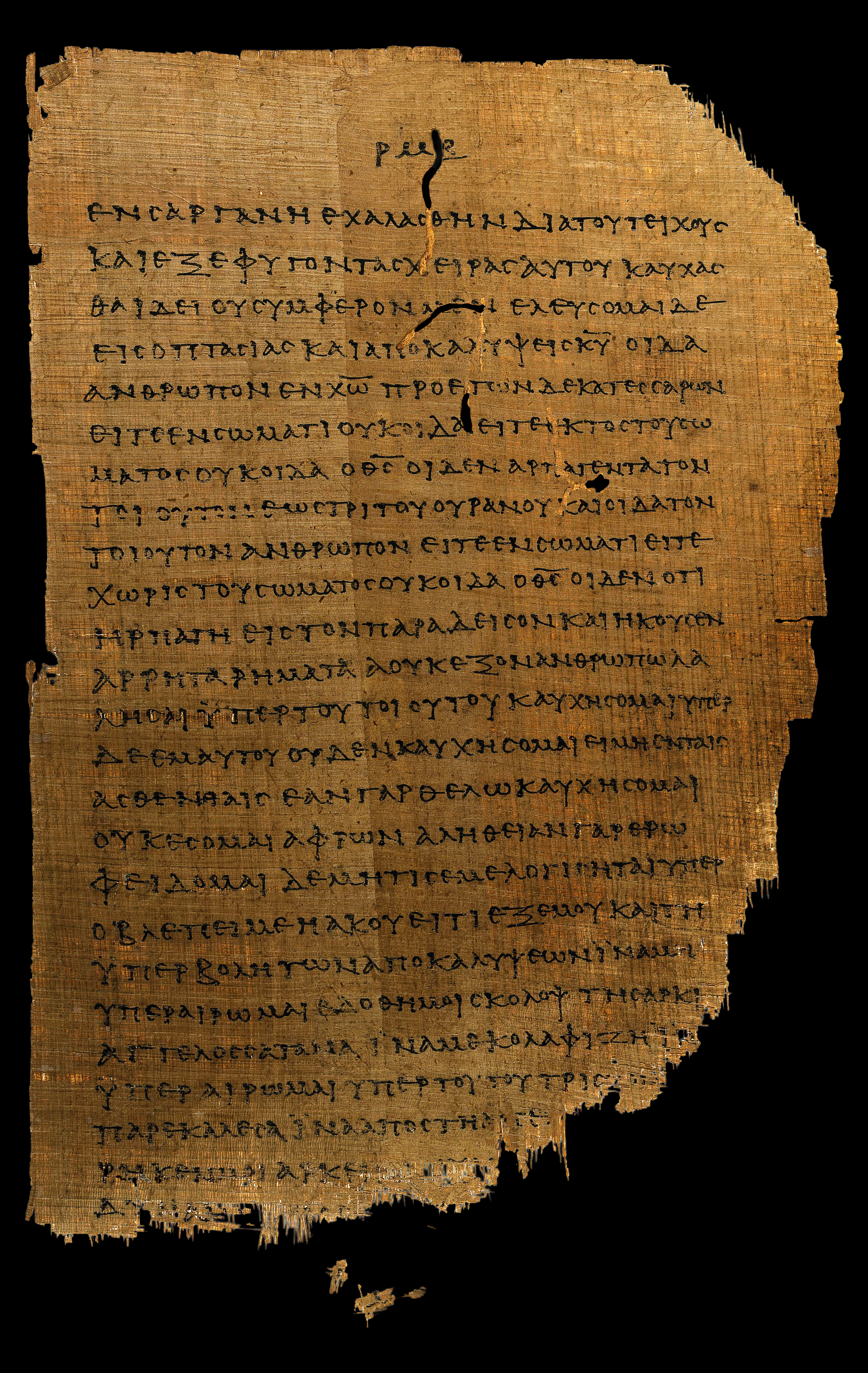
2 Corinthians 11:33–12:9 on Papyrus 46 (fol. 142 recto; c. AD 200)

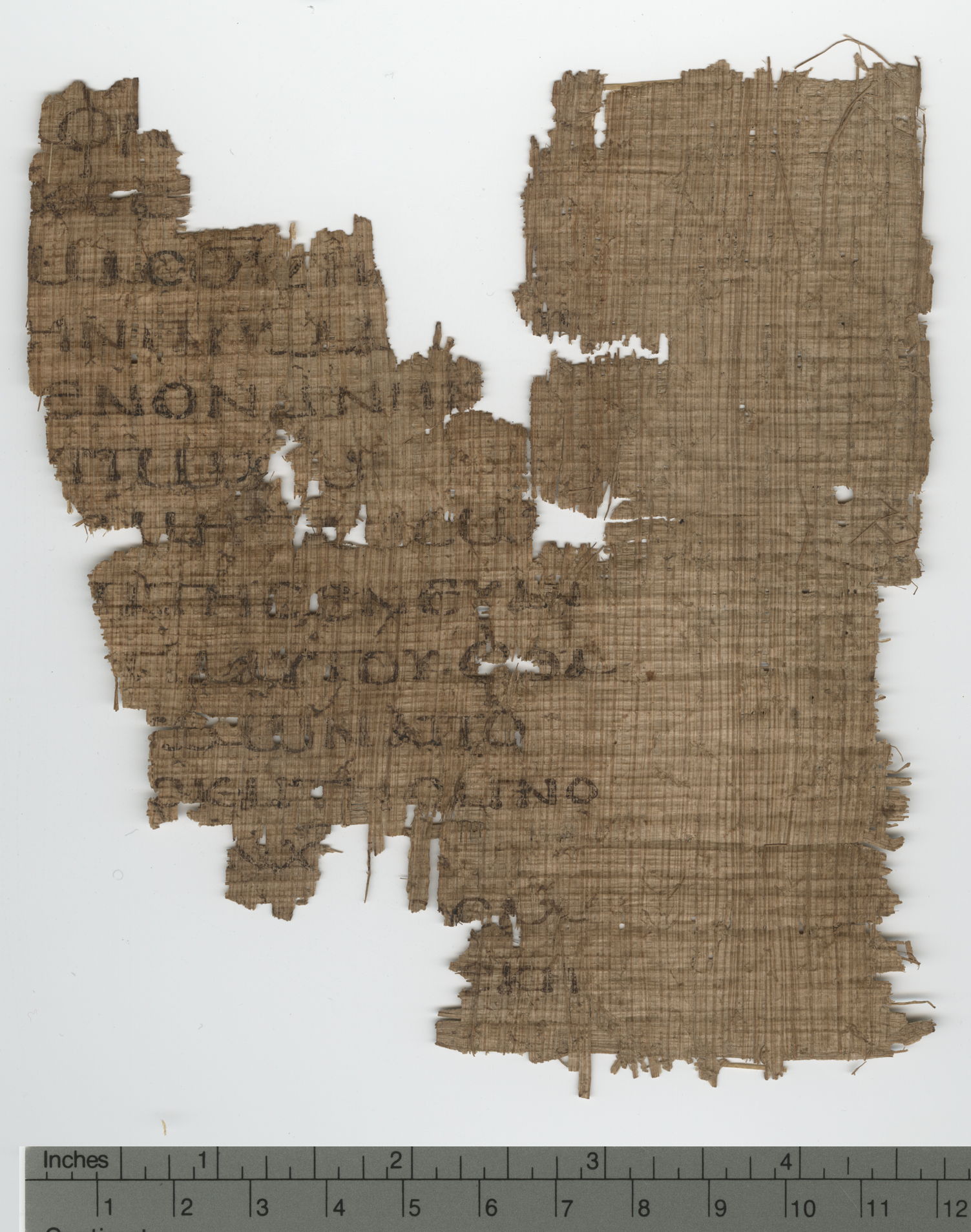
Papyrus 124 contains a fragment of 2 Corinthians (6th century AD)

The Second Epistle to the Corinthians (Note: The book is sometimes called the Second Letter of Paul to the Corinthians, or simply 2 Corinthians. It is most commonly abbreviated as "2 Cor.") is a Pauline epistle of the New Testament of the Christian Bible. The epistle is attributed to Paul the Apostle and a co-author named Timothy, and is addressed to the church in Corinth and Christians in the surrounding province of Achaea, in modern-day Greece. According to Jerome, Titus was the amanuensis of this epistle.

== Composition ==
While there is little doubt among scholars that Paul is the author, there is discussion over whether the Epistle was originally one letter or composed from two or more of Paul's letters.

Although the New Testament contains only two letters to the Corinthian church, the evidence from the letters themselves is that he wrote at least four and the church replied at least once:

1. 1 Corinthians 5:9 ("I wrote unto you in an epistle not to company with fornicators", KJV) refers to an early letter, sometimes called the "warning letter" or the "previous letter."
2. 1 Corinthians
3. The Severe Letter: Paul refers to an earlier "letter of tears" in 2 Corinthians 2:3–4 and 7:8. 1 Corinthians does not match that description, so this "letter of tears" may have been written between 1 Corinthians and 2 Corinthians.
4. 2 Corinthians

1 Corinthians 7:1 states that Paul was replying to certain questions written and sent to him by the church in Corinth.

The abrupt change of tone from being previously harmonious to bitterly reproachful in 2 Corinthians 10–13 has led many to infer that chapters 10–13 form part of the "letter of tears" which were in some way appended to Paul's main letter. Those who disagree with this assessment usually say that the "letter of tears" is no longer extant. Others argue that although the letter of tears is no longer extant, chapters 10–13 come from a later letter.

The seemingly sudden change of subject from chapter 7 to chapters 8–9 leads some scholars to conclude that chapters 8–9 were originally a separate letter, and some even consider the two chapters to have originally been distinct themselves. Other scholars dispute this claim, however.

Some scholars also find fragments of the "warning letter", or of other letters, in chapters 1–9, for instance that part of the "warning letter" is preserved in 2 Cor 6:14–7:1, but these hypotheses are less popular.

== Structure ==
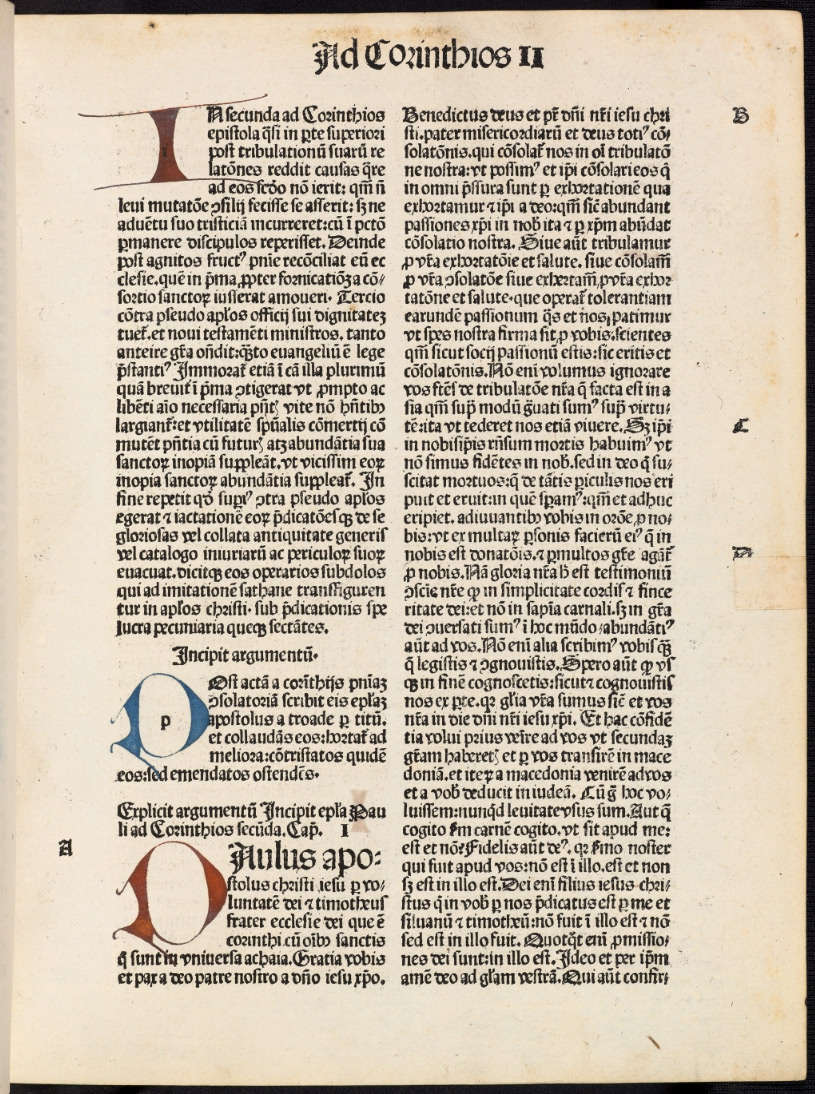
The first page of II Corinthians from a 1486 Latin Bible (Bodleian Library).

The book is usually divided as follows:

- 1:1–11 – Greeting
- 1:12 – 7:16 – Paul defends his actions and apostleship, affirming his affection for the Corinthians.
- 8:1 – 9:15 – Instructions for the collection for the poor in the Jerusalem church.
- 10:1 – 13:10 – A polemic defense of his apostleship
- 13:11–13 – Closing greetings

== Background ==
Paul's contacts with the Corinthian church can be reconstructed as follows:

1. Paul visits Corinth for the first time, spending about 18 months there (Acts 18:11). He then leaves Corinth and spends about 3 years in Ephesus (Acts 19:8, 19:10, 20:31). (Roughly from AD 53 to 57, see 1 Corinthians article).
2. Paul writes the "warning letter" in his first year from Ephesus (1 Corinthians 5:9).
3. Paul writes 1 Corinthians from his second year at Ephesus.
4. Paul visits the Corinthian church a second time, as he indicated he would in 1 Corinthians 16:6. Probably during his last year in Ephesus. 2 Corinthians 2:1 calls this a "painful visit".
5. Paul writes the "letter of tears".
6. Paul writes 2 Corinthians, indicating his desire to visit the Corinthian church a third time (2 Cor 12:14, 2 Cor 13:1). The letter does not indicate where he is writing from, but it is usually dated after Paul left Ephesus for Macedonia (Acts 20), from either Philippi or Thessalonica in Macedonia.
7. Paul presumably made the third visit after writing 2 Corinthians, because Acts 20:2–3 indicates he spent 3 months in Greece. In his letter to Rome, written at this time, he sent salutations from some of the principal members of the church to the Romans.

== Content ==
Paul refers to himself in the letter as an apostle of Jesus Christ by the will of God, and reassures the people of Corinth that they will not have another painful visit, but what he has to say is not to cause pain but to reassure them of the love he has for them. The letter is shorter than the first one, and can be confusing if the reader is unaware of the social, religious, and economic situation of the community. Paul felt the situation in Corinth was still complicated and felt attacked.

Some challenged his authority as an apostle, and he compares the level of difficulty to other cities he has visited who had embraced it, like the Galatians. He is criticized for the way he speaks and writes and finds it just to defend himself with some of his important teachings. He states the importance of forgiving others, and God's new agreement that comes from the Spirit of the living God (2 Cor. 3:3), and the importance of being a person of Christ and giving generously to God's people in Jerusalem, and ends with his own experience of how God changed his life (Sandmel, 1979).

== Uniqueness ==
According to Easton's Bible Dictionary,

This epistle, it has been well said, shows the individuality of the apostle more than any other. "Human weakness, spiritual strength, the deepest tenderness of affection, wounded feeling, sternness, irony, rebuke, impassioned self-vindication, humility, a just self-respect, zeal for the welfare of the weak and suffering, as well as for the progress of the church of Christ and for the spiritual advancement of its members, are all displayed in turn in the course of his appeal." —Lias, Second Corinthians.

== See also ==
- 2 Corinthians 11:19
- Authorship of the Pauline Epistles
- Come-outer
- First Epistle to the Corinthians
- The Spirit of Detroit, 1958 sculpture
- Textual variants in the Second Epistle to the Corinthians
- Third Epistle to the Corinthians

== Notes ==
Second Epistle to the Corinthians Pauline Epistle
Preceded by First Corinthians	New Testament; Books of the Bible	Succeeded by Galatians
