= Ephesians 3 =

- ← chapter 2 chapter 4 →
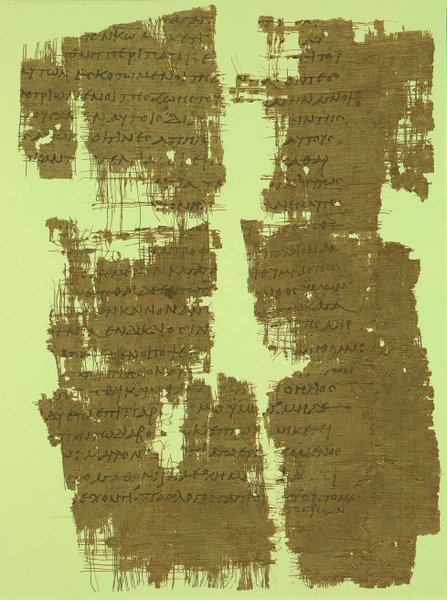
- A fragment showing Ephesians 4:16-29 on recto side of Papyrus 49 from the third century.
- Book: Epistle to the Ephesians
- Category: Pauline epistles
- Christian Bible part: New Testament
- Order in the Christian part: 10

Ephesians 3 is the third chapter of the Epistle to the Ephesians in the New Testament of the Christian Bible. Traditionally, it is believed to have been written by Apostle Paul while he was in prison in Rome (around AD 62), but more recently it has been suggested that it was written between AD 80 and 100 by another writer using Paul's name and style. This chapter is part of a long prayer of Paul (from Ephesians 1:3 to 3:21), with the particular section about Paul's stewardship of the great divine mystery, the petition for Christ to dwell in the believers' heart, and a doxology.

== Text ==
The original text was written in Koine Greek. This chapter is divided into 21 verses.

=== Textual witnesses ===
Some early manuscripts containing the text of this chapter are:

- Papyrus 46 (~AD 200)
- Codex Vaticanus (325–50)
- Codex Sinaiticus (330–60)
- Codex Alexandrinus (400–40)
- Codex Ephraemi Rescriptus (~450; complete)
- Codex Freerianus (~450; extant verses 6–8, 18–20)
- Codex Claromontanus (~550)

== Paul's Stewardship of the Great Mystery (3:1–13) ==
The section starts with Paul's self-identification as "the prisoner of Christ Jesus", a position which he willingly endures "for the sake of the Gentiles" (verse 1), that is, for his converts' benefit. Many interpreters consider that this statement reflects both his relationship of being 'bound' to Christ, and also his being held in captivity (in Rome).

Then, the main focus is the divine mystery that Paul is commissioned to unveil. It is the mystery of Christ as God's grace for all.

=== Verses 3–4 ===
^{3}how that by revelation He made known to me the mystery (as I have briefly written already, ^{4}by which, when you read, you may understand my knowledge in the mystery of Christ),

=== Verse 5 ===
which [mystery] in other ages was not made known to the sons of men, as it has now been revealed by the Spirit to His holy apostles and prophets.

- "In other ages", or "to people in other generations"; there are two main Greek readings:

in the Textus Receptus, Greek: ὃ ἐν ἑτέραις γενεαῖς, (ho en heterais geneais);
in critical Greek texts, the ἐν does not appear.

Heinrich Meyer argues that the ἐν has been added "against decisive testimony" among early texts. The meaning may be "at earlier times" or "to previous generations".

=== Verse 9 ===
and to make all see what is the fellowship of the mystery, which from the beginning of the ages has been hidden in God who created all things through Jesus Christ;

== Resuming Prayer (3:14–21) ==
The object of the long prayer is God alone, "experienced and approached as Father" (verse 14), to whom Paul petitions for the strengthening of the believers' condition. Paul's prayer is for Christ to dwell in the hearts of believers as the sign of 'genuine' conversion of faith. The prayer is closed by a benediction, ascribing glory to God.

=== Verse 16 ===
that He would grant you, according to the riches of His glory, to be strengthened with might through His Spirit in the inner man,

- "According to the riches of his glory": that is, according to the abundant completeness of grace in Christ Jesus.
- "To be strengthened with might by His Spirit in the inner man": is Paul's petition to the Father of Christ, that he would enable the believers to be strong during the tribulations, give the needed fresh supplies of power to perform duties of grace, to resist Satan and its temptations, to oppose corruptions, and to bear the cross, holding on and out to the end. This is a gift of God's free grace; a "grant" in form of "his Spirit", who strengthens them by guiding them to the fullness of grace in Christ, by placing the love of God in their hearts, applying the promises of the Gospel to them, and making the Gospel itself useful to give them strength.
- "The inner man": or soul of man, as the subject of the blessing, which is "the seat of grace". This last phrase is joined to the beginning of the next verse in the Arabic, Syriac and Ethiopian versions, "in the inner man Christ may dwell".

== See also ==
- Holy Spirit
- Jesus Christ
- Knowledge of Christ
- Related Bible parts: Romans 8, 2 Corinthians 1, Ephesians 1

== Bibliography ==
- Dunn, J. D. G. (2007). "68. Ephesians". In Barton, John; Muddiman, John (eds.). The Oxford Bible Commentary (first (paperback) ed.). Oxford University Press. pp. 1165–1179. ISBN 978-0199277186.
