= Ephesians 6 =

- ← chapter 5 Philippians 1 →
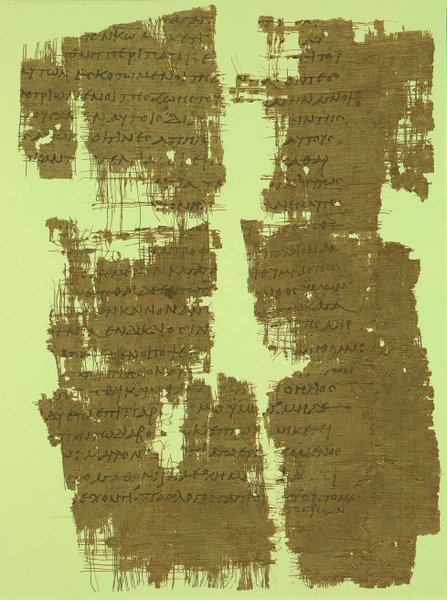
- A fragment showing Ephesians 4:16-29 on recto side of Papyrus 49 from the third century.
- Book: Epistle to the Ephesians
- Category: Pauline epistles
- Christian Bible part: New Testament
- Order in the Christian part: 10

Ephesians 6 is the sixth and final chapter of the Epistle to the Ephesians in the New Testament of the Christian Bible. Traditionally, it is believed to be written by Apostle Paul while he was in prison in Rome (around AD 62), but more recently, it is suggested to be written between AD 80 and 100 by another writer using Paul's name and style. This chapter is a part of Paul's exhortation (Ephesians 4–6), with the particular section about how Christians should live in their responsibilities as households (5:21–6:9) and in the battle against spiritual forces (6:10–20), with a final benediction to close the epistle (6:21–24).

== Text ==
The original text was written in Koine Greek. This chapter is divided into 24 verses.

=== Textual witnesses ===
Some early manuscripts containing the text of this chapter are:

- Papyrus 46 (c. AD 200)
- Codex Vaticanus (325-350)
- Codex Sinaiticus (330-360)
- Codex Alexandrinus (400-440)
- Codex Freerianus (c. 450; extant verses 1, 10-12, 19-21)
- Codex Claromontanus (c. 550)

== Old Testament references ==
- Ephesians 6:3: Exodus 20:12; Deuteronomy 5:16

== Household Rules (6:1–9) ==
Commencing from 5:21, this part is built on "the tabulated framework of the rules for good household management rules", as the health and stability of the society depend on the "basic relationships within the household: "husband and wife", "father and children", "master and slaves". The first pairing, husband and wife, is discussed in previous chapter, so in this chapter, the second ("children and parents"; verses 1–4) and the third pairing ("slaves and masters"; verses 5–9) are in focus.

=== Verse 2 ===
"Honor your father and mother," which is the first commandment with promise:

Citation from the Ten Commandments, in particular Exodus 20:12 or Deuteronomy 5:16

=== Verse 3 ===
"that it may be well with you and you may live long on the earth."

Citation from: Deuteronomy 5:16

=== Verse 4 ===
"And you, fathers, do not provoke your children to wrath, but bring them up in the training and admonition of the Lord."

=== Verse 5 ===
"Bondservants, be obedient to those who are your masters according to the flesh, with fear and trembling, in sincerity of heart, as to Christ;"

Note that the original Greek text uses the term "δοῦλοι" (translated in the NKJV as "Bondservants"), which is generally translated as "slave", and which, in the context of first-century Greece under Roman rule, referred to chattels.

=== Verse 6 ===
"not with eyeservice, as men-pleasers, but as bondservants of Christ, doing the will of God from the heart,"

=== Verse 7 ===
"with goodwill doing service, as to the Lord, and not to men,"

=== Verse 8 ===
"knowing that whatever good anyone does, he will receive the same from the Lord, whether he is a slave or free."

=== Verse 9 ===
"And you, masters, do the same things to them, giving up threatening, knowing that your own Master also is in heaven, and there is no partiality with Him."

- "Your own Master": the NU renders it "He who is both their Master and yours is".

== Put on the Armour of God (6:10-20) ==
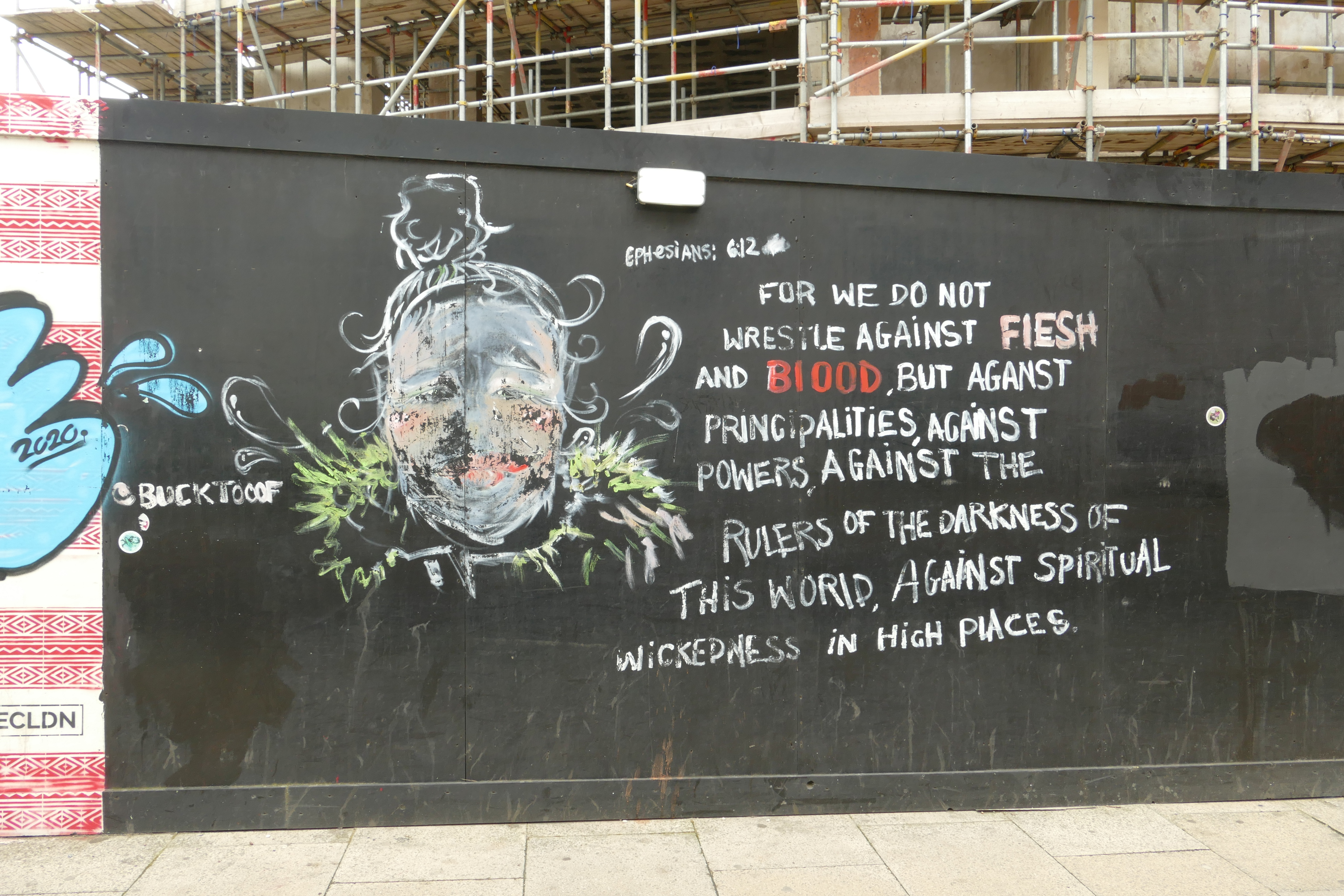
Ephesians 6:12 quoted in graffiti in London.

This exhortation is the most vivid portrayal of the Christian spiritual struggle, in a metaphor of warfare, with detailed list of equipment of the Divine Warrior.

=== Verse 10 ===
Finally, my brethren, be strong in the Lord, and in the power of his might.

- "Be strong": the Greek word here is in present tense, not aorist, suggesting the 'maintenance' rather than the 'attainment' of strength, whereas the Latin versions read confortamini, recalling the original idea of "comfort", "comforter,” in older English usage.

=== Verse 11 ===
Put on the whole armour of God, that ye may be able to stand against the wiles of the devil.

- Compare the various elements of the whole armour of God here to Wisdom 5:17–20 ("The Lord will take his zeal as his whole armour, and will arm all creation to repel his enemies").

=== Verse 12 ===
For we wrestle not against flesh and blood, but against principalities, against powers, against the rulers of the darkness of this world, against spiritual wickedness in high places.

=== Verse 13 ===
Therefore take up the whole armour of God, that you may be able to withstand in the evil day, and having done all, to stand.

- "Take up the whole armour of God": a repetition of the exhortation in Ephesians 6:11, which seems necessary due to many powerful enemies as mentioned in the previous verse, to be followed by an account of the several parts of this armour.
- "You may be able to withstand in the evil day": which is "be able to stand against the wiles, stratagems and power of Satan", opposing his schemes, and resisting his temptations, as the Syriac version renders it, "that ye may be able to meet the evil one" (to face him in the battle), while the Greek and other versions read, "in the evil day".
- "Having done all": or "having overcome" or "withstand the enemy", as in "having routed the enemy", and then to stand as conquerors.

== Conclusion and Benediction (6:21-24) ==
Paul's benediction in this epistle contains the "two great Pauline words—love and faith", with the balance between "divine enabling ('from [both] God the Father and the Lord Jesus Christ') and human response ('all who have an undying love for our Lord Jesus Christ')".

== See also ==
- Armour of God
- Ten Commandments
- Tychicus
- Other related Bible parts: Exodus 20, Deuteronomy 5, Ephesians 1, Ephesians 5, Philippians 1, Hebrews 7, Jude.

== Bibliography ==
- Dunn, J. D. G. (2007). "68. Ephesians". In Barton, John; Muddiman, John (eds.). The Oxford Bible Commentary (first (paperback) ed.). Oxford University Press. pp. 1165–1179. ISBN 978-0199277186.
