= Ephesians 4 =

- ← chapter 3 chapter 5 →
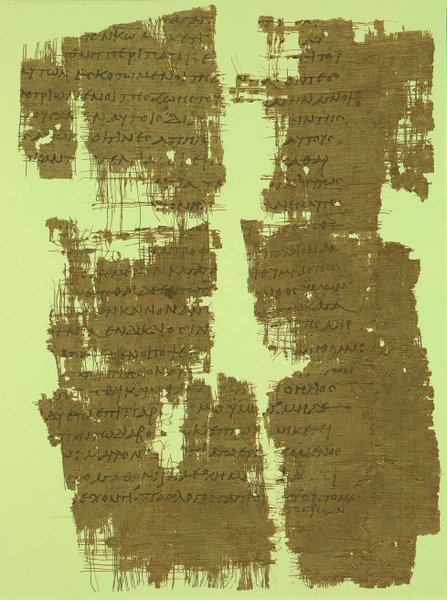
- A fragment showing Ephesians 4:16-29 on recto side of Papyrus 49 from the third century.
- Book: Epistle to the Ephesians
- Category: Pauline epistles
- Christian Bible part: New Testament
- Order in the Christian part: 10

Ephesians 4 is the fourth chapter of the Epistle to the Ephesians in the New Testament of the Christian Bible. Traditionally, it is believed to have been written by Apostle Paul while he was in prison in Rome (around AD 62), but more recently, it has been suggested that it was written between AD 80 and 100 by another writer using Paul's name and style. This chapter is a part of Paul's exhortation (Ephesians 4–6), with the particular section about the mutual interdependence of the Christians as the church (verses 1–16) and how they should live in the world (4:17–5:20).

== Text ==
The original text was written in Koine Greek. This chapter is divided into 32 verses.

=== Textual witnesses ===
Some early manuscripts containing the text of this chapter are:

- Papyrus 46 (~200)
- Papyrus 49 (3rd century; extant verses 16–29; 31–32).
- Codex Vaticanus (325–50)
- Codex Sinaiticus (330–60)
- Codex Alexandrinus (400–40)
- Codex Ephraemi Rescriptus (~450; extant verses 1–16)
- Codex Freerianus (~450; extant verses 9–11, 17–19, 28–30)
- Codex Claromontanus (~550)

=== Old Testament references ===
- Ephesians 4:8: Psalm 68:18
- Ephesians 4:25: Zechariah 8:16
- Ephesians 4:26: Psalm 4:4

== The Church in its Calling and Confession (4:1–6) ==
Paul exhorts the church about its "calling", to live the whole life as a response to God's summons, while maintaining the unity in the Spirit; this a common calling for every believer, regardless of rank or ability, focusing on one common Lord, Jesus.

=== Verse 1 ===
I therefore, the prisoner of the Lord, beseech you that ye walk worthy of the vocation wherewith ye are called,

- "Prisoner of the Lord": or "in the Lord" recalls Paul's physical status (also in Ephesians 3:1).
- "Beseech": or "exhort, encourage", is a characteristic style of Paul when opening his exhortations (cf. Romans 12:1; 1 Thessalonians 4:1).
- "Walk": is a Jewish "metaphor for daily conduct ('lead life')", from Hebrew word halakh ("walk") which becomes "Halakha" ("rules for conduct").

=== Verse 3 ===
Endeavouring to keep the unity of the Spirit in the bond of peace.

- "Endeavouring" (KJV; NKJV: "endeavoring"): an 'eager determination to maintain the unity of the Spirit and the peace which benefits all'.
- "Unity of the Spirit": The fact is 'this unity is given by the Spirit', originating from the 'shared experience of the one Spirit' (cf. 1 Corinthians 12:13; Philippians 2:1), not created by Christians, although they could destroy it.

=== Verses 4–6 ===
⁴There is one body and one Spirit, just as you were called in one hope of your calling; ⁵one Lord, one faith, one baptism; ⁶one God and Father of all, who is above all, and through all, and in you all.

The "triadic" confession – one Spirit… one Lord… one God – in the verses 4–6 recalls the scope of the unity in the church.

== The Character and Purpose of Ministry in the Body of Christ (4:7–16) ==
This section can be seen as an elaboration of Romans 12:4–8 and 1 Corinthians 12:4–31, emphasizing that the church as Christ's body can only function effectively with the recognition of each church member's function within the body, and each individual function is appointed and made to work effectively by the enabling from Christ.

=== Verse 8 ===
Therefore He says:

"When He ascended on high,
He led captivity captive,
And gave gifts to men."

Psalm 68:18 reads:

You have ascended on high,
You have led captivity captive;
You have received gifts among men,
Even from the rebellious,
That the Lord God might dwell there.

=== Verse 11 ===
And He Himself gave some to be apostles, some prophets, some evangelists, and some pastors and teachers,

- "Apostles": refer to the people who were directly called by Jesus Christ, received the teaching from Him and the commission to preach it, guided by the Holy Spirit, "had a power to work miracles for the confirmation of their doctrine" as well as the authority to preach the Gospel everywhere, to plant churches, not confined to a particular place or church. An apostle was the first and chief office in the church, elected before Christ's ascension but not received power until the coming of the Spirit (on Pentecost). The task of the apostle is not only to bear witness of Christ in Jerusalem, in Judea and Samaria, but in the farthest ends of the earth.
- "Prophets": are some people who are not private members of churches, but may prophesy or teach in a private way. They are not ordinary ministers of the word, but those who have a special gift of interpreting the Scriptures, the prophecies of the Old Testament, and foretelling things to come. Among these were Agabus and others in the church of Antioch (Acts 11:27; 13:1)
- "Evangelists": are not meant the writers of the Gospels, as Matthew, Mark, Luke and John, some of whom were also apostles, but rather as preachers of the Gospel, distinct from the ordinary ministers. Their position was seen as below that of the apostles, but above those of pastors and teachers; however, they were the companions or assistants of the apostles, and helped them in their work. Among them were Philip (the deacon), Luke, Titus, Timothy, and others. They were not fixed ministers in any place, but were sent anywhere as needed.
- "Pastors and teachers": (also called "doctors" of the church) may be thought to be different, because of:
  - the place where they work: the pastors in the church, while the teachers in the (church or theological) school
  - the different subject of their ministry: the pastors attending to practical, the teachers to doctrinal points
  - the charge of the church: the pastors are the shepherds of the flock, as overseers, same as the bishops and elders, whereas the teachers can be the gifted members in the church, assistants to the pastors (ministers of the word)

Nonetheless, it should be seen as one and the same office, that the term "teachers" is only explanative of the figurative word "pastors" or shepherds.

=== Verse 13 ===
till we all come to the unity of the faith and of the knowledge of the Son of God, to a perfect man, to the measure of the stature of the fullness of Christ;

- "To a perfect man": Greek: "to a full-grown man".

== To Live as the Church in the World (4:17–32) ==
Stretching to 5:20, this part gives a general all-purpose set of instruction, with the classic "put off (vices) and put on (virtues)" in verses 22–32, using the familiar imagery of changing clothes for changing the character and lifestyle.

== See also ==
- Holy Spirit
- Jesus Christ
- Trinity
- Related Bible parts: Psalm 4, Psalm 68, Zechariah 8, Ephesians 1, Ephesians 3, Hebrews 7

== Bibliography ==
- Dunn, J. D. G. (2007). "68. Ephesians". In Barton, John; Muddiman, John (eds.). The Oxford Bible Commentary (paperback) (1st ed.). Oxford University Press. pp. 1165–79. ISBN 978-0-19927718-6.
- Kirkpatrick, A. F. (1901). The Book of Psalms: with Introduction and Notes: Books IV & V: Psalms XC–CL. The Cambridge Bible for Schools and Colleges. Cambridge: At the University Press.
