= Ephesians 5 =

- ← chapter 4 chapter 6 →
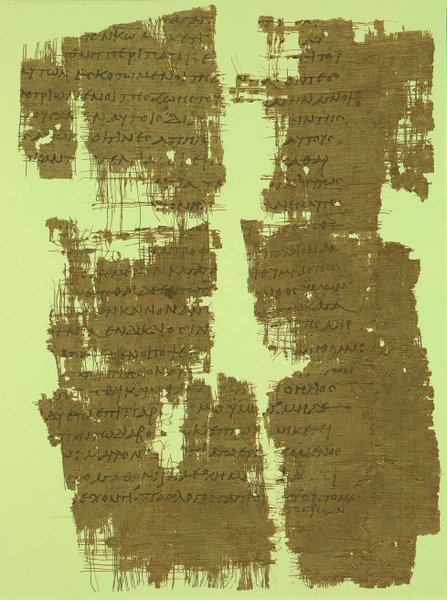
- A fragment showing Ephesians 4:16–29 on recto side of Papyrus 49 from the third century.
- Book: Epistle to the Ephesians
- Category: Pauline epistles
- Christian Bible part: New Testament
- Order in the Christian part: 10

Ephesians 5 is the fifth chapter of the Epistle to the Ephesians in the New Testament of the Christian Bible. Traditionally, it is believed to be written by Apostle Paul while he was in prison in Rome (around AD 62). More recently, it is suggested to be written between AD 80 and 100 by another writer using Paul's name and style, however this theory is not widely accepted. This chapter is a part of Paul's exhortation (Ephesians 4–6), containing a particular section about how Christians should live in the world (4:17–5:20) and covering their responsibilities as households (5:21–6:9).

== Text ==
The original text was written in Koine Greek. This chapter is divided into 33 verses.

=== Textual witnesses ===
Some early manuscripts containing the text of this chapter are:

- Papyrus 46 (c. 200)
- Papyrus 49 (3rd century)
- Codex Vaticanus (325–350)
- Codex Sinaiticus (330–360)
- Codex Alexandrinus (400–440)
- Codex Freerianus (c. 450; extant verses 6–11, 20–24, 32–33)
- Codex Claromontanus (c. 550)

=== Old Testament references ===
- Ephesians 5:14: Isaiah 60:1
- Ephesians 5:15: Colossians 4:5
- Ephesians 5:31: Genesis 2:24

== Walking in the light (verses 1–20) ==
This section provides an antithesis between the old and new life in three contrasts:

1. "life modelled on the love of God and Christ" vs. "life mismatched with vices" which causes God's anger (verses 1–7);
2. "life in the light" vs. "life full of hidden shamefulness" (verses 8–14);
3. an unwise life relying on strong drink vs. a wise life guided by the Spirit (verses 5:15–20).

=== Verse 14 ===
Therefore He says
"Awake, you who sleep,
Arise from the dead,
And Christ will give you light."

These words may be an extract from an early hymn. Charles Wesley describes "one who sleeps" as "a sinner satisfied in his sins; contented to remain in his fallen state".

=== Verse 16 ===
Redeeming the time, because the days are evil.

- "Redeeming the time": from Ancient Greek: ἐξαγοραζόμενοι τὸν καιρόν, exagorazomenoi ton kairon, "buying up for yourselves the opportunity".

=== Verse 17 ===
Therefore do not be unwise, but understand what the will of the Lord is.

- "Therefore do not be unwise": from Greek: διὰ τοῦτο μὴ γίνεσθε ἄφρονες, dia touto mē ginesthe aphrones, "for this cause become not ye foolish".

=== Verses 18-19 ===
Do not be drunk with wine, in which is dissipation; but be filled with the Spirit, speaking to one another in psalms and hymns and spiritual songs, singing and making melody in your heart to the Lord.

Biblical theologian James Dunn notes a comparison between this exhortation and Pentecost day as it is recounted in Acts 2: "As at Pentecost the effect of the Spirit could give an impression of drunkenness. The difference is that strong drink taken in excess resulted in debauchery and dissipation", whereas fullness of the Spirit came to expression most characteristically in ... praise [of God] from the heart, and life lived in a spirit of thankfulness to God. The Second Vatican Council included "train[ing] the faithful to sing hymns and spiritual songs in their hearts to the Lord" in its list of tasks which should feature in the ministry of a Catholic priest.

== Household rules (verses 21–33) ==
Stretching to Ephesians 6:9, this part is built on "the tabulated framework of the rules for good household management rules", acknowledging a household as the basic unit of a society. The health and stability of the society (and also the state) depend on the "basic relationships within the household: "husband and wife", "father and children", "master and slaves". The good ethics in the Christian households, unlike in non-Christian ones, "have to be lived 'in the Lord', patterned after the unselfish, sacrificial love of Christ".

=== Verse 21 ===
- Ephesians 5:21 NRSVue reads "being subject to one another out of reverence for Christ".
- Ephesians 5:21 KJV reads "Submitting yourselves one to another in the fear of God".

=== Verse 22 ===
- Ephesians 5:22 NRSVue reads "Wives, be subject to your husbands as to the Lord."
- Ephesians 5:22 KJV reads "Wives, submit yourselves unto your own husbands, as unto the Lord."

Scholar David deSilva notes that in this instance, Paul modifies the Aristotelian household code by adding a preface that each should submit to one another (Verse 21).

Scholar Craig S. Keener also sees this as a call to mutual submission, citing Ephesians 2:11–22; 4:4–6; Galatians 3:28 and 1 Corinthians 12:13 as evidence towards the equality that existed among believers regardless of their gender. He theorizes that Paul may have made this modification as an apologetic defense of Christianity against Roman policy makers. Since Paul was awaiting trial in Rome, Keener posits this is how he wanted to show that Christians still adhered to certain Roman societal standards and that they were different from other eastern Mediterranean religions that the Romans saw as undignified, like the cult of Dionysus. Keener references Paul's Epistle to the Romans, which encourages them to "be subject to the governing authorities" Romans 13:1–7 (NRSVue) as further evidence to this idea. Keener also explains that the Greek word for "submitting" only appears in verse 21 and not verse 22 in the Greek text. As he puts it:

"If wives submit to their husbands, Roman moralists and others could not claim that Christianity subverted pagan morals. But if the husband also submits, and husband and wife act as equals before God, Paul is demanding something more than Roman moralists typically demanded, not less."

Scholar Markus Barth views the wife's submission towards the husband (verse 22) as an example of Christians submitting to one another (verse 21).

Additionally, the NRSVue indicates that the "be subject" in verse 22 is missing from the original Greek text.

=== Verse 25 ===
Husbands, love your wives, just as Christ also loved the church and gave Himself for her,

=== Verse 27 ===
and that He might present to Himself a glorious church, not having spot, or wrinkle, or any such thing, but that it should be holy and without blemish.

- "He": translated from the Greek pronoun αὐτός, autos, which focuses attention on Christ as the one who makes the church glorious.
- "Without blemish": that is, "without any fault to be found in her"; apparently alluding to the sacrifices (Leviticus 1:3; cf. Song of Solomon 4:7).

=== Verse 28 ===
So husbands ought to love their own wives as their own bodies; he who loves his wife loves himself.

- "As their own bodies": like a common Jewish saying that a man's wife is "as his own body"; and it is one of the precepts of their wise men, that a man should honour his wife more than his body, and "love her as his body"; for as they also say, they are but one body; the apostle seems to speak in the language of his countrymen, as his doctrine and theirs agree in this point.
- "He that loves his wife loves himself": because she is one body and flesh with him.

== See also ==
- Christian marriage
- Jesus Christ
- Related Bible parts: Genesis 2, Genesis 3, Jeremiah 8, Jeremiah 23, Ephesians 6, Colossians 3, 1 Peter 3.

== Bibliography ==
- Dunn, J. D. G. (2007). "68. Ephesians". In Barton, John; Muddiman, John (eds.). The Oxford Bible Commentary (first (paperback) ed.). Oxford University Press. pp. 1165–1179. ISBN 978-0199277186.
- Keener, Craig S. (June 1, 1992). Paul, Women, and Wives: Marriage and Women's Ministry in the Letters of Paul. Baker Academic. ISBN 978-0801046766.
