= Noel Woodroffe =

Christian pastor

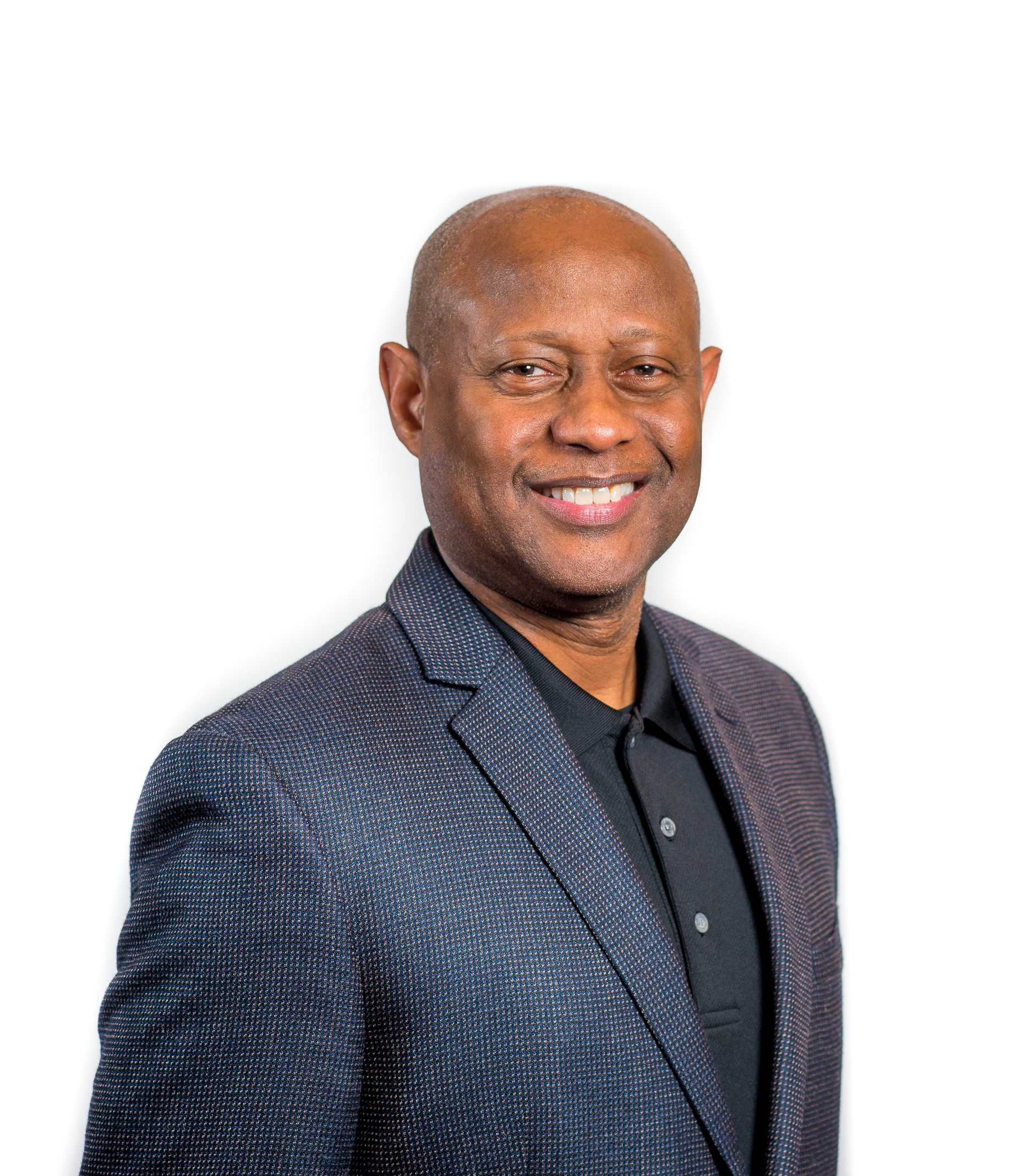
- Woodroffe in 2016

Personal life
- Spouse: June Woodroffe (m. 1974)
- Children: 3
- Website: congresswbn.org

Religious life
- Religion: Christian (full-gospel)
- Church: Elijah Centre

Senior posting
- Post: Senior Elder (1990–present)
- Organization: Congress WBN

Noel Woodroffe is the Senior Elder (pastor) of Elijah Centre and President of Congress WBN, an international, faith-centered non-profit organization, with an extensive church network. Congress WBN now has churches in more than 120 nations.

== Church Planting ==
Woodroffe started Elijah Centre on December 23, 1990, in the country of Trinidad and Tobago. The church had spread across the globe in major cities in both developed and developing countries, with a number of satellite sites, referred to as Embassies.

Elijah Centre's primary base is in Trinidad, with Woodroffe as the Senior Elder, and Graham Taylor as the Associate Pastor. The mandate of Elijah Centre is “Preparing the way, Preparing the people, Restoring all things” and seeks to bring all people into maturity, attaining to the whole measure of the fullness of Christ (Ephesians 4:13).

== NorthGate College ==
Woodroffe also started NorthGate College in 1999. NorthGate College is located in St. Augustine, Trinidad, and is an expression of the non-profit organization, Congress WBN in the sphere of education. NorthGate College claims that it "seeks to engineer a quality learning environment that goes far beyond an academic experience."

In 2014, the school won an award from US-based Science, Technology, Engineering, and Math (STEM) initiative Cubes in Space for the Top Design Category. NorthGate College's watchwords are Purpose, Accuracy and Destiny; discover your life's purpose, determine to accomplish it without error, fulfill your destiny. To date there are NorthGate schools in Jamaica, Kenya, Uganda, United States and Zambia.

In speaking on the Principles for Nations Development, Woodroffe has identified five key steps that a nation can undertake to enter into the knowledge economy: Long-Term Vision, Curriculum Design and Educator Training, Disconnection from Past Experiences, Mobilization of Artists and Establishment of Strategic Functional Leadership.

== Bibliography ==
- The Ultimate Warrior: Avoiding Defilement (1994).
- Governmental Prayer: The Warfare Expression of the Apostolic (1998).
- Understanding the Prophetic Dimension (1998).
- The Present Reformation of the Church (1998).
- A Developed Prophetic Perspective (2010), with Scott Webster.
- Understanding the Apostolic (2019).
