= Papyrus 92 =

Early New Testament papyrus

- New Testament manuscript
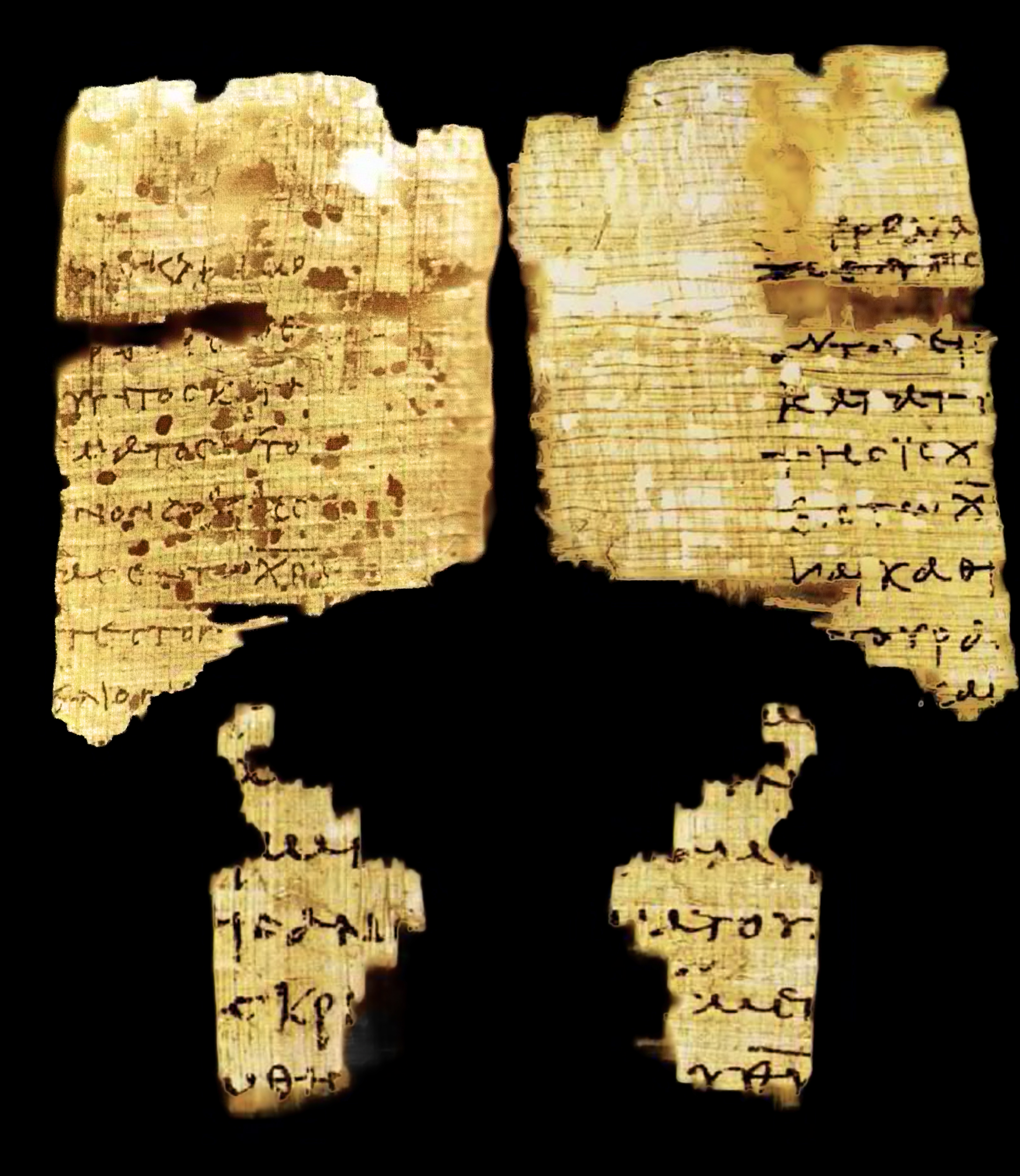
- Ephesians 1:11-13 (top-left); 1:19-21 (top-right); 2 Thessalonians 1:4-5 (bottom-left); 1:11-12 (bottom-right)
- Name: P. Narmuthis 69.39a/229a
- Sign: 𝔓^{92}
- Text: Ephesians 1:11-13,19-21; 2 Thessalonians 1:4-5,11-12
- Date: c. 300
- Script: Greek
- Found: Faiyum, Egypt
- Now at: Egyptian Museum, Cairo, Egypt
- Cite: Claudio Gallazzi, Frammenti di un codice con le Epistole de Paolo, ZPE 46 (1982), pp. 117–122
- Size: 14.5 by 21.5 cm
- Type: Alexandrian text-type

Papyrus 92 (in the Gregory-Aland numbering), designated by 𝔓^{92}, (PNarmuthis 69.39a/229a) is an early New Testament papyrus.

== Description ==
The writing is in 27 lines per page.

The Greek text of this codex is a representative of the Alexandrian text-type. 𝔓^{92} shows strong affinity with 𝔓^{46}, Codex Sinaiticus, and Vaticanus.

It is currently housed at the Egyptian Museum (Inv. 69,39a + 69,229a) in Cairo.

== See also ==
- 2 Thessalonians 1
- Ephesians 1
- List of New Testament papyri
- Oxyrhynchus Papyri
