= Authorship of the Pauline epistles =

The Pauline epistles are the thirteen books in the New Testament traditionally attributed to Paul the Apostle.

There is strong consensus in modern New Testament scholarship on a core group of authentic Pauline epistles whose authorship is rarely contested: Romans, 1 and 2 Corinthians, Galatians, Philippians, 1 Thessalonians, and Philemon.

Several additional letters bearing Paul's name are disputed among scholars, namely Colossians, 2 Thessalonians, Ephesians, 1 and 2 Timothy, and Titus. Scholarly opinion is sharply divided on whether or not Colossians and 2 Thessalonians are genuine letters of Paul. The remaining four contested epistles – Ephesians, as well as the three known as the Pastoral Epistles (1 and 2 Timothy, and Titus) – have been labeled pseudepigraphical works by most critical scholars. Some scholars have proposed that Paul may have used an amanuensis, or secretary, in writing the disputed letters, or that the letters may have come from followers writing in Paul's name, using material from his surviving letters and letters written by him that no longer survive.

There are two examples of pseudonymous letters written in Paul's name apart from the New Testament epistles, the Epistle to the Laodiceans and 3 Corinthians.

The Epistle to the Hebrews is actually anonymous, but it has been traditionally attributed to Paul. The Church Father Origen of Alexandria rejected the Pauline authorship of Hebrews, instead asserting that, although the ideas expressed in the letter were genuinely Pauline, the letter itself had actually been written by someone else. Most modern scholars generally agree that Hebrews was not written by the apostle Paul. Various other possible authorships have been suggested.

On the letters where scholars are divided on Pauline authorship, scholars have relied on internal arguments (e.g. style, vocabulary, subject matter) which tend to be subjective, rather than external and historical evidences (e.g. extant manuscripts, reception of ancient authors, early canonical lists, letter titles, early translation collections of the New Testament). Early Christians consistently rejected forged writings and pseudepigraphers were unlikely to succeed since such writings did not circulate extensively compared to the writings contained in the New Testament, which have external evidence of being recognized as Pauline directly or indirectly.

| Status | Categorization | Epistle |
|---|---|---|
| Undisputed | Authentic Pauline epistles | First Epistle to the Thessalonians; Epistle to the Galatians; First Epistle to the Corinthians; Second Epistle to the Corinthians; Epistle to the Philippians; Epistle to Philemon; Epistle to the Romans |
| Disputed | Deutero-Pauline epistles; may be authentic | Epistle to the Ephesians; Epistle to the Colossians; Second Epistle to the Thessalonians |
| Disputed | Pastoral epistles; probably not authentic | First Epistle to Timothy; Second Epistle to Timothy; Epistle to Titus |
| Disputed | Anonymous sermon; nearly universally regarded as non-Pauline | Epistle to the Hebrews |

== Criteria used by scholars ==
Scholars use a number of methods of historiography and higher criticism to determine whether a text is properly attributed to its author. The primary methods used for Paul's letters are the following:

=== Internal evidence ===
Internal evidence consists of what the author states about himself in the letter, either explicitly – the author clearly identifies himself – or implicitly – provides autobiographical details. This evidence is important in spite of its problems. For example, because the author of the Epistle to the Hebrews never identified himself, scholars as early as Origen of Alexandria in the 3rd century suspected that Paul was not the author.

=== External evidence ===
External evidence consists of references, again either explicit or implicit, to the text, especially during earliest times by those who had access to reliable sources now lost.

Explicit references would be mentioning the text or letter by name, or referencing a recognizable form of that text. Examples include a list of accepted biblical books, such as the Muratorian fragment, or the contents of an early manuscript, such as Papyrus 46. These witnesses are often either damaged or too late in date to provide much help.

Implicit references are quotations from Paul (especially indirect or unattributed), or expressions of ideas and phrases that appear in his works. This use or reference implies the material quoted was in existence at the time the external evidence was created. For example, the Second Epistle to the Thessalonians is named by Irenaeus in the mid-2nd century, as well as by Justin Martyr and Ignatius of Antioch; it is considered unlikely for the surviving version of this letter to have been written after this time. On the other hand, lack of witness by ancient sources suggests a later date – an argument from silence. However, use of this line of reasoning is dangerous, because of the incompleteness of the historical record: many ancient texts are lost, damaged, have been revised or possibly contrived.

=== Historical setting ===
An independently written narrative of Paul's life and ministry, found in the Acts of the Apostles, is used to determine the date, and possible authorship, of Pauline letters by locating their origin within the context of his life. For example, Paul mentions that he is a prisoner in his Epistle to Philemon 1:7; based on this statement, J. A. T. Robinson argued that this captivity was Paul's imprisonment in Caesarea, while W. M. Ramsay identified this as Paul's captivity in Rome, while others have placed the captivity in Ephesus.

One difficulty with this position is the limited data available on Paul's historical setting, and this is especially true with the conclusion of the narrative of Acts prior to Paul's death. It also assumes that the book of Acts was written by an actual traveling companion of Paul's. Recent scholarship challenges the validity of using the Acts of the Apostles to determine anything about Pauline letters. Borg and Crossan cautiously comment that "the author of Acts was not concerned with factual inerrancy"; Dewey et al. note in similar vein that "in much of Acts as a whole, Luke gives us historical fiction rather than an historical report." They therefore "recommend against using Acts, either as a whole or in part, as a historical source for Paul's career".

==== Paul's use of secretaries ====
A number of scholars have argued that from biographic details from Paul, he likely suffered from some physical impediment such as vision loss or damaged hands and Paul does explicitly state, or even names, in multiple epistles that he used secretaries (or amenuenses), which was a common practice in the Greco-Roman world; potentially explaining the epistles that are seemingly non-Pauline. Paul used scribal secretaries and may have had a team of readers, which adds layers to how Paul's letters were composed.

=== Language and style ===
Vocabulary, sentence structure, employment of idioms and common phrases, etc. are analyzed for consistency with the author's other known works. A similar style implies common authorship, while a radically divergent vocabulary implies different authors. For example, E. J. Goodspeed argued that the vocabulary of the Epistle to the Ephesians showed a literary relationship with the First Epistle of Clement, written around the end of the 1st century. Similarly, E. Percy argued that the speech and style of Colossians more strongly resembled Pauline authorship than not. Of course, style and language can vary for reasons other than differing authorship, such as the subject of the letter, the recipient, the circumstances of the times, a different amanuensis, or simply maturation on the part of the author.

=== Contents and theology ===
Similar to internal evidence, doctrinal consistency and development are examined against the author's other known works. Theological themes like the eschaton or the Mosaic Law could reappear in different works, but in a similar manner. A consistent point of view implies a common author; contradictory or unrelated teachings imply multiple authors. For example, W. Michaelis saw the Christological likeness between the Pastoral Epistles and some of Paul's undisputed works, and argued in favor of Pauline authorship. A problem with this method is analyzing the coherence of a body of diverse and developing teachings. This is seen in the disagreement between scholars. For example, with the same epistles mentioned above, B. S. Easton argued their theological notions disagreed with other Pauline works and rejected Pauline authorship. G. Lohfink argued the theology of the Pastoral Epistles agreed with Paul's, but took this as proof someone wishing to enjoy the authority of an apostle copied the famous church leader.

== Undisputed epistles ==
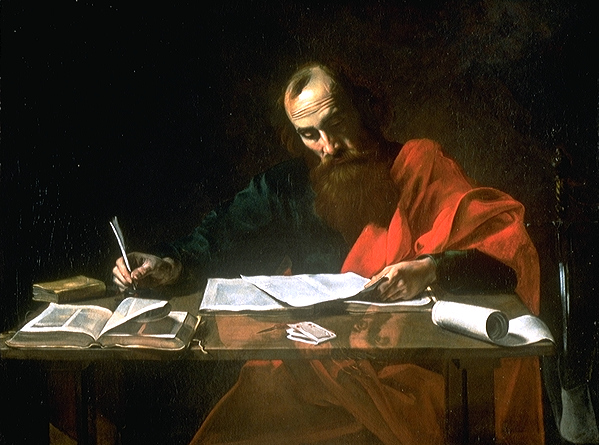
Saint Paul Writing His Epistles, 17th-century painting. Most scholars think Paul actually dictated his letters to a secretary, for example Romans 16:22, cites a scribe named Tertius. According to 2 Thessalonians 3,17, Paul authenticated all of his letters with the final greeting and signature.

The name "undisputed" epistles represents the scholarly consensus asserting that Paul authored each letter.

The undisputed letters are:

- Romans
- First Corinthians
- Second Corinthians
- Galatians
- Philippians
- First Thessalonians
- Philemon

These seven letters are quoted or mentioned by the earliest of sources, and are included in every ancient canon, including that of Marcion (c. 140). There is no record of scholarly doubt concerning authorship until the 19th century when, around 1840, German scholar Ferdinand Christian Baur accepted only four of the letters bearing Paul's name as genuine, which he called the Hauptebriefe (Romans, 1 and 2 Corinthians, and Galatians). Hilgenfeld (1875) and H. J. Holtzmann (1885) expanded Baur's four into seven, by adding Philemon, 1 Thessalonians, and Philippians.

Nowadays, few scholars argue against this list of seven epistles, which all share common themes, emphasis, vocabulary and style. They also exhibit a uniformity of doctrine concerning the Mosaic Law, Christ, and faith.

== Disputed epistles ==
The six disputed epistles below are believed by some scholars to have come from followers writing in his name, using material from Paul's surviving letters and letters written by him that no longer survive.

=== Colossians ===
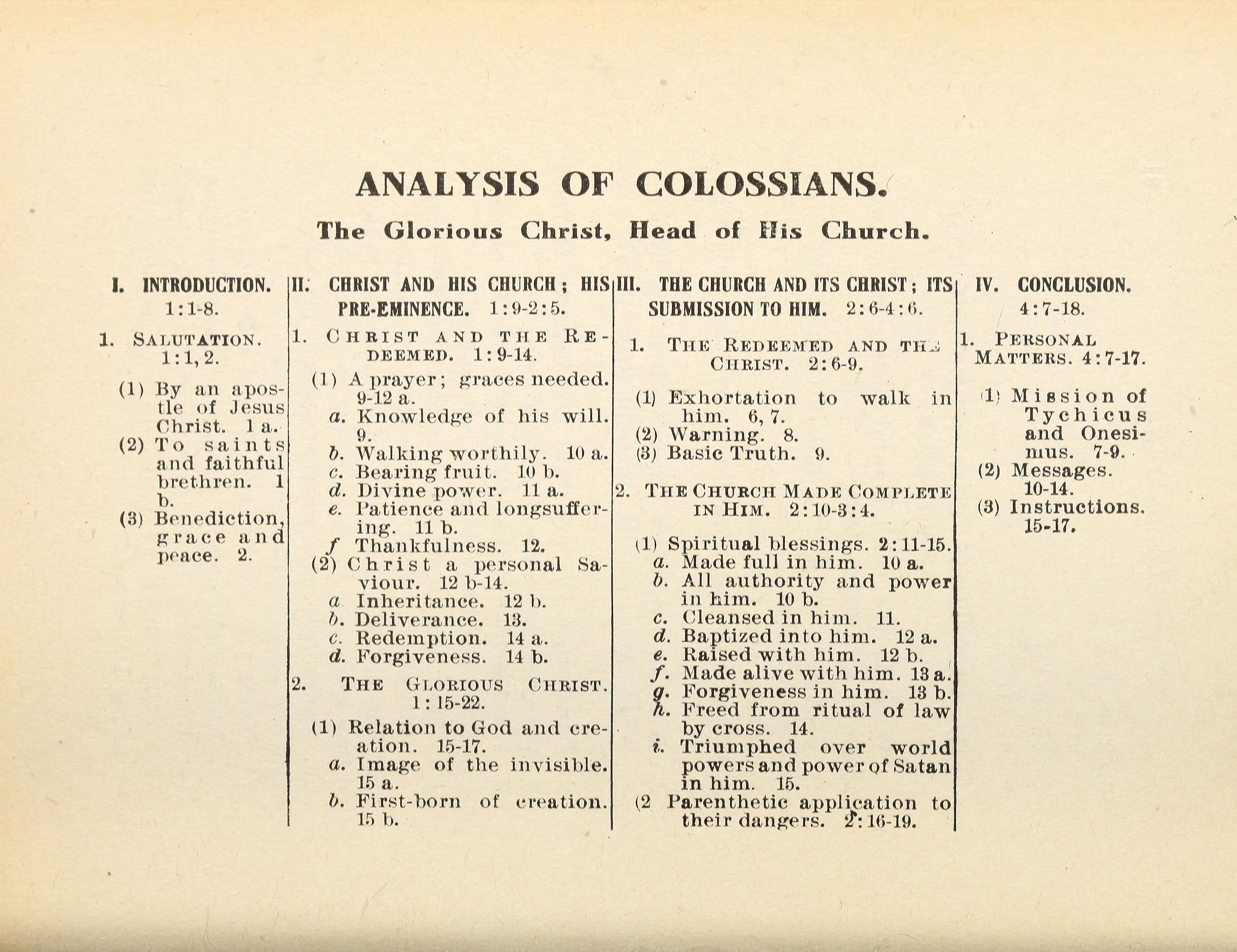
Schematic of Colossians, William Brooks Taylor (1910)

Although Colossians is witnessed by the same historical sources as the undisputed texts, Pauline authorship of Colossians has found some critics. It was originally doubted by F. C. Baur, though others working from his general thesis, such as H. J. Holtzmann, argued that an original brief Pauline text experienced many interpolations by a later editor. The basis for this early objection was that the letter aimed at refuting Gnosticism, a heresy which had not reached its ascendancy until the early 2nd century. This thesis subsequently declined, especially following an analysis of Gnosticism by R. Wilson, in which he contended that the supposed parallels to Gnosticism were unsupported.

Another argument centers on differences in style and vocabulary. W. Bujard attempted to show significant stylistic differences between Colossians and Paul's other works, such as unusual genitive constructions. Others have analyzed the style and reached opposite conclusions.

The extensiveness of the theological development in the epistle compared to other epistles has also led to skepticism concerning Pauline authorship. H. Conzelmann made such an argument, pointing to differing theological concepts of "hope". Others accepting this analysis have asserted that the text is merely a late text of Paul, though the thesis has not found wide scholarly concurrence. Many have argued that Colossians has an ecclesiology that is incompatible with the authentic Pauline texts. While Romans and 1 Corinthians, like Colossians, speak of a body of Christ, it is clear that Paul imagines the church as the body of Christ on earth (Rom 7:4, 12:5; 1 Cor 12:27). Conversely, the text of Colossians seems to imagine that Christ is the head of the body, which is the church (Col 1:18). Additionally, detractors of the traditional authorship of Colossians point to the work's "realized eschatology". Whereas Paul, an apocalyptic Jew, anticipated the bodily resurrection of the faithful in the future (Rom 6:4-5), Colossians indicates that believers have already been raised with Christ (2:12; 3:1). Similarly, though Paul envisions Christ's triumph over rulers and authorities as a future event (1 Cor 15:24), Colossians 2:15 acknowledges this as having already occurred. Another intriguing distinction between the Colossian correspondence and the "7 authentic letters" is the lack of a financial request for the poor in Jerusalem. Kiley notes that while every one of Paul's main letters wish for financial report, Colossians is mysteriously lacking such a request.

The connection between Colossians and Philemon, an undisputed letter, is significant. A certain Archippus is referred to in both Philemon 2 and Colossians 4:17, and the greetings of both letters bear similar names. Additionally, the nearly identical phrases of Philemon 5 and Colossians 1:4 and the presence of Onesimus in both letters stands out. However, the connection between the two epistles can be used by those on both sides of the Pauline vs. deutero-Pauline debate. To those who favor Pauline authorship of Colossians, this is evidence of same authorship; to those who do not, this, combined with the other evidence noted, is indicative of a skillful forger.

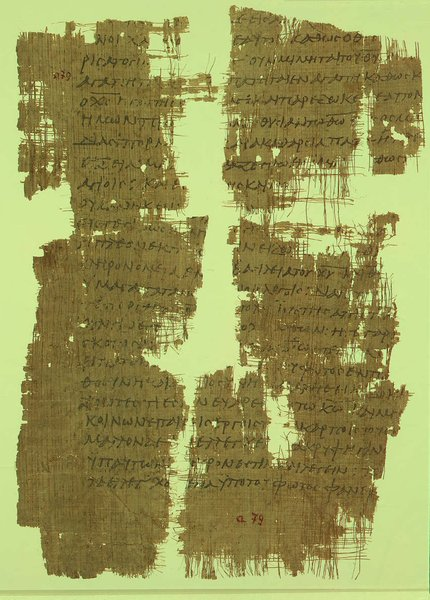
Papyrus 49, a 3rd-century manuscript of the Epistle to the Ephesians

=== Ephesians ===
The author of Ephesians claims to be Paul in the opening address, itself identical to those of Second Corinthians and Colossians. There were no doubts in the late-second century church that Paul wrote the epistle: it was quoted authoritatively by Church Fathers, including Tertullian, Clement of Alexandria, and Irenaeus, among others. Ephesians may be an amended version of the letter to the Laodiceans in the Marcion canon (130) and the Muratorian fragment (before 180).

The authenticity of this letter was first disputed by the Dutch Renaissance scholar Desiderius Erasmus, and in more recent times has drawn detailed criticism.

The letter is made up of 50 sentences, 9 with over 50 words. The closest, Romans, has 3 out of 581 sentences of such length. E. J. Goodspeed, and C. L. Mitton argued the style was unlike Paul's other works. Many words in the letter are not in the "undisputed" epistles. However, still, some scholars do not find the style of Ephesians to be unlike Paul's authentic letters. In antiquity, the Greek Church Fathers, many of whom noticed the divergent Greek style of Hebrews, made no such comments about Ephesians.

In this letter, the word ecclesia is used to refer theologically to the universal church rather than, as Paul typically employs it, to the local churches that he had founded. Also, the eschatological tone is more subdued than in other letters: the expectation of Christ's imminent return is unmentioned, while future generations are (3:21), as is a concern for social order. W. G. Kümmel argued that the theology is later than Paul.

There is a close literary relationship between the Colossians and Ephesians. E. F. Scott argued that Paul used one letter as a model for the other, whereas others have considered Ephesians to be derivative of Colossians, edited and reworked by another. Donald Guthrie summarized the implications of this: "Advocates of non-Pauline authorship find it difficult to conceive that one mind could have produced two works possessing so remarkable a degree of similarity in theme and phraseology and yet differing in so many other respects, whereas advocates of Pauline authorship are equally emphatic that two minds could not have produced two such works with so much subtle interdependence blended with independence."

Paul founded and built up the church in Ephesus; however, this letter does not appear to contain the usual specific greetings, seen in Paul's other letters, addressed to people he remembers. There is some evidence that the Letter to the Ephesians might have been sent to several different churches. Some of the oldest manuscripts of this letter are not addressed to "God's holy people who are at Ephesus", but merely to "God's holy people". Marcion, around 140, quoted from this letter and attributed the quote to Paul's "Letter to the Laodiceans". In the 17th century, James Ussher suggested that this might have been a "circular letter" that Paul sent to several churches, including Ephesus and Laodicea. This would explain why Paul's usual personal greetings are absent: these could not be included in a letter sent to several different churches.

Summary of the reasons for thinking Ephesians is not by Paul:

- The language and style are different. Ephesians contains 40 new words, e.g. 1:3 "heavenly places"; "family, or fatherhood" (3:15). 1:19 has four different words for "power"; Ephesians and Colossians use a different word for "reconcile" from Paul's word (Col 1:20, 22; Eph 2:16). And they both use many very long sentences, e.g. 1:3-14; 1:15-23; 3:1-7; 4:11-16; 6:14-20. Also Col 1:9-20.
- Metaphors, or illustrations in Paul are turned into actual objective realities in Ephesians (and sometimes in Colossians also). E.g. faith, gospel, word of God, reconciliation, salvation, human resurrection and glorification, the Church as the Body of Christ, Minister, Saints of God.
- Ephesians shows that the Church is becoming an advanced and powerful universal institution. In Paul's time there was no universal Church in that sense, but only informal gatherings of individual believing communities.

=== Second Epistle to the Thessalonians ===
The epistle was included in the Marcion canon and the Muratorian fragment; it was mentioned by name by Irenaeus, and quoted by Ignatius, Justin, and Polycarp. The Pauline authorship of 2 Thessalonians was first questioned by J.E.C. Schmidt in 1801. In recent times, criticism of Pauline authorship was raised by H. J. Holtzmann and G. Hollmann (see above). Much of the dispute concerns the linguistic similarity between 1 Thessalonians and 2 Thessalonians. For example, 1 Thessalonians 2:9 is almost identical to 2 Thessalonians 3:8. This has been explained in the following ways: Paul wrote 2 Thessalonians soon after writing 1 Thessalonians or with the aid of a copy of 1 Thessalonians, or Paul wrote 1 Thessalonians himself but a later writer imitated him, or the linguistic similarities are seen as subtle enough to make imitation an unnecessary hypothesis. A survey of 111 scholars from the British New Testament Conference in 2011 found 63 in favor of authenticity, while 13 rejected Pauline authorship and 35 felt uncertain.

Udo Schnelle argued that 2 Thessalonians was significantly different in style from the undisputed epistles, characterizing it as whole and narrow, rather than as a lively and abrupt discussion on a range of issues. Moreover, Alfred Loisy argued that it reflected knowledge of the synoptic gospels, which, according to the current scholarly consensus, had not been written when Paul wrote his epistles. Bart D. Ehrman viewed the insistence of genuineness within the letter and the strong condemnation of forgery at its start as ploys commonly used by forgers. G. Milligan observed that a church which possessed an authentic letter of Paul would be unlikely to accept a fake addressed to them. However, Milligan's analysis assumes that 2 Thessalonians is not a late forgery and thus was received by the Thessalonian community.

Its authorship is disputed, with critical commentators being evenly divided on Pauline authorship. 2 Thessalonians is often regarded as pseudonymous due to its apparent divergence in theology/content from Paul's authentic letters. Perhaps the most frequent attack on authenticity concerns the letter's eschatology; Ehrman points in Forged (2011) to differences between eschatological expectations in 1 Thessalonians (4:15; 5:2-3) and 2 Thessalonians' view as a future event (3:6-12). However, others understand 2 Thessalonians to be a correction of his audience's misunderstanding of 1 Thessalonians, which explains Paul's tone shift.

It has also been argued that the Christology of 2 Thessalonians is at odds with the true Paul, as what is attributed to Jesus in 2 Thessalonians is normally attributed to God in his other letters. As identified by M.J.J. Menken, several phrases in 2 Thessalonians seem to share a theme with phrases in 1 Thessalonians, yet with an elevated role of Christ. In particular, Jesus is described as the giver of salvation rather than God (2 Thess 2:13 vs. 1 Thess 1:4). Norman Perrin claimed that, in the time of Paul, prayer usually treated God the Father as ultimate judge, rather than Jesus. From this hypothesis he contrasted 2 Thessalonians 3:5 with 1 Thessalonians 3:13 and contended that 2 Thessalonians was written sometime after Paul's death. Still, some see the texts in 2 Thessalonians that seem to elevate the role of Christ as overblown. Abraham Malherbe, for example, acknowledges the presence of Jesus as eschatological judge already in 1 Thessalonians 2:19; 3:11-12.

2 Thessalonians 2:2 seems to warn its readers against accepting teachings from a letter forged in Paul's name, indicating that either a pseudonymous author was attempting to disarm the letter's audience into accepting his forgery as authentically Pauline, or that Paul himself was writing to warn his readers that forged letters were being circulated in his name.

=== Pastoral epistles ===
The First Epistle to Timothy, the Second Epistle to Timothy, and the Epistle to Titus are often referred to as the pastoral epistles and are the most disputed of all the epistles ascribed to Paul.

Despite this, these epistles were accepted as genuine by many, perhaps most of the ante-Nicene Church Fathers. Some scholars have argued that the letters were certainly accepted as Pauline by the time of Irenaeus. They were also included in the Muratorian fragment. According to Jerome, the gnostic Christian Basilides also rejected these epistles, and Tatian, while accepting Titus, rejected other Pauline epistles. Marcion (c. 140) excluded all three, along with Hebrews, from his otherwise complete Pauline corpus, and it is impossible to determine whether or not he knew of them. Donald Guthrie, for instance, argues that Marcion's theology would have been cause to reject the letters since it was incompatible with certain passages, such as 1 Tim 1:8 and 1 Tim 6:20, while Ehrman suggests that 2nd-century proto-orthodox Christians had motivation to forge the Pastorals to combat the Gnostic use of other Pauline epistles. Even the ancient writer Tertullian (c. 220), in Adv. Marc. V.21, expresses confusion as to why these epistles had not been included in Marcion's canon. Modern scholars postulate that the Pauline Epistles originally circulated in three forms, for example, from The Canon Debate, attributed to Harry Y. Gamble:

1. "Marcion's collection that begins with Galatians and ends with Philemon";
2. "Papyrus 46, dated about 200, that follows the order that became established except for reversing Ephesians and Galatians";
3. "[T]he letters to seven churches, treating those to the same church as one letter and basing the order on length, so that Corinthians is first and Colossians (perhaps including Philemon) is last."

Beginning in the early 19th century, many German biblical scholars began to question the traditional attribution of these letters to Paul. The vocabulary and phraseology used in the Pastorals is often at variance with that of the other epistles. Over 1/3 of the vocabulary is not used anywhere else in the Pauline epistles, and over 1/5 is not used anywhere else in the New Testament, while 2/3 of the non-Pauline vocabulary is used by 2nd-century Christian writers. For this reason, and because of a claimed precedence of 1 Clement, some scholars have associated these works with later 2nd-century Christian writings. The precedence of 1 Clement was challenged by R. Falconer, while L. T. Johnson challenged the linguistic analysis as based on the arbitrary grouping of the three epistles together: he argued that this obscures the alleged similarities between 1 Timothy and 1 Corinthians, between Titus and the other travel letters, and between 2 Timothy and Philippians.

Norman Perrin argued that Paul's travels to Crete (Titus 1:5-6), again to Ephesus (1 Tim 1:3), Nicopolis (Titus 3:12), and Troas (2 Tim 1:15, 4:13) cannot be fit into any reconstruction of Paul's life or works as determined from the other epistles or from Acts. In this he was preceded by several scholars who rejected Pauline authorship. Robinson argued against this analysis, while others have debated whether this should be grounds for rejection of Pauline authorship, as Acts concludes while Paul is still alive. Harnack, Lightfoot and other scholars have suggested hypothetical scenarios that would have these epistles written near the end of Paul's life without contradicting biographical information in the other epistles or Acts. Scholars arguing for the authenticity of the pastorals posit a "second career" of Paul to explain the occasion for the visits mentioned in these letters, though contemporary scholars generally consider the "second career" of Paul to be a creation of later Christian communities.

Other reasons for a 2nd-century date have been argued. The pastoral epistles lay out church organization concerning the character and requirements for bishops, elders, deacons, and widows. Some scholars have claimed that these offices could not have appeared during Paul's lifetime. In terms of theology, some scholars claim that the Pastorals reflect more the characteristics of 2nd century (proto-orthodox) church thought, than those of the 1st century in terms of apocalyptic expectations; the pastorals chose to lay down instructions for a long time after the death of the apostles. Some have argued that the Pastorals condemn forms of Hellenic mysticism and gnosticism, which were seen as insignificant in the 1st century; that said, some scholarship of 1st-century Gnosticism has suggested an earlier dominance of Gnostic views.

=== Hebrews ===
Unlike the thirteen epistles above, the Epistle to the Hebrews is internally anonymous. Moreover, scholars such as Robert Grant have noted the many obvious differences in language and style between Hebrews and the correspondence explicitly ascribed to Paul.

Church Fathers and ante-Nicene writers such as Tertullian noted the different manner in which the theology and doctrine of the epistle appear. This variance led many to name other candidates for authorship, such as the fellow traveller of Paul called Barnabas (favored by Tertullian), a follower of John the Baptist called Apollos (favored by Martin Luther and several modern scholars), as well as less likely candidates such as Silas and even Priscilla.

Origen of Alexandria (c. 240), as quoted by Eusebius (c. 330) had this to say on the matter: "That the character of the diction of the epistle entitled To the Hebrews has not the apostle's rudeness in speech, who confessed himself rude in speech, that is, in style, but that the epistle is better Greek in the framing of its diction, will be admitted by everyone who is able to discern differences of style. But again, on the other hand, that the thoughts of the epistle are admirable, and not inferior to the acknowledged writings of the apostle, to this also everyone will consent as true who has given attention to reading the apostle.... But as for myself, if I were to state my own opinion, I should say that the thoughts are the apostle's, but that the style and composition belonged to one who called to mind the apostle's teachings and, as it were, made short notes of what his master said. If any church, therefore, holds this epistle as Paul's, let it be commended for this also. For not without reason have the men of old handed it down as Paul's. But who wrote the epistle, in truth God knows. Yet the account which has reached us [is twofold], some saying that Clement, who was bishop of the Romans, wrote the epistle, others, that it was Luke, he who wrote the Gospel and the Acts."

Modern scholars consider the evidence against Pauline authorship of Hebrews too solid for dispute. Donald Guthrie, in his New Testament Introduction (1976), commented that "most modern writers find more difficulty in imagining how this Epistle was ever attributed to Paul than in disposing of the theory." Harold Attridge states that "it is certainly not a work of the apostle"; Daniel Wallace states, "the arguments against Pauline authorship [...] are conclusive." As a result, few supporters of Pauline authorship remain. As Richard Heard notes, in his Introduction to The New Testament, "modern critics have confirmed that the epistle cannot be attributed to Paul and have for the most part agreed with Origen's judgement, 'But as to who wrote the epistle, God knows the truth.'"

== History of the Pauline canon ==
There are no preserved lists of a Christian New Testament canon from the 1st century and early 2nd century.

The Second Epistle of Peter, a pseudepigrapha written between 60–130 and attributed to Saint Peter refers to the Pauline epistles, but does not specify which ones it is referring to.

Pope Clement I (c. 35–99 AD) quotes from 1 Corinthians and alludes to Paul's epistles to the Romans, Galatians, Ephesians, and Philippians, Titus, 1 Timothy, numerous phrases from the Epistle to the Hebrews, and possible material from the Acts of the Apostles.

Ignatius of Antioch (died c. 110 AD) appears to have quoted from Romans, 1 Corinthians, Ephesians, Colossians, and 1 Thessalonians.

Polycarp of Smyrna (69–156 AD) not only quoted from 2 Thessalonians but also the Gospel of Matthew, Gospel of Mark, Gospel of Luke, Acts of the Apostles, 1 Corinthians, 2 Corinthians, Galatians, Ephesians, Philippians, 1 Thessalonians, 1 Timothy, 2 Timothy, Epistle to the Hebrews, 1 Peter, 1 John, 3 John.

The Epistle of Barnabas, written between 96 and 135, quotes from Galatians.

Clement of Alexandria (c. 150–215 AD) quotes all the books of the New Testament with the exception of Philemon, James, 2 Peter, and 2 and 3 John.

The earliest extant canon containing Paul's letters is from the 2nd century:

- It is a canon compiled by Marcion, the founder of Marcionism. Marcion did not include any of the modern Gospels, only his Gospel of Marcion, which according to his enemies he had edited from the Gospel of Luke, whereas he claimed that it was their version which was edited from his original gospel. He includes ten epistles by Paul, omitting the Pastoral Epistles (Titus, 1 and 2 Timothy), as well as To the Hebrews.
- The Muratorian fragment (c. 140) accepts all Pauline epistles as authentic, but does not mention the Epistle to the Hebrews and rejects the Epistle to the Laodiceans and the Epistle to the Alexandrians as spurious.
- Papyrus 46, one of the oldest New Testament manuscripts (c. 200), contains the last eight chapters of Romans; all of Hebrews; virtually all of 1–2 Corinthians; all of Ephesians, Galatians, Philippians, Colossians; and two chapters of 1 Thessalonians. Because it is damaged there is no scholarly consensus on whether to consider the omission of a text definitive.

== Historical criticism of the authorship of the epistles ==
In the nineteenth century, a group of scholars at the University of Tübingen, led by Ferdinand Christian Baur, engaged in radical bible study, including the claim that only Romans, 1 and 2 Corinthians, and Galatians were authored by Paul (i.e. Hauptbriefe). During the same period, another group of Dutch scholars led by Allard Pierson (Dutch Radical School), argued that all Pauline epistles were pseudepigrapha, a view that was also shared by Bruno Bauer, Rudolf Steck and Arthur Drews.

== See also ==
- Authorship of Luke–Acts
- Authorship of the Johannine works
- Authorship of the Petrine epistles
- Historicity of Jesus
- History of Christianity
- New Testament apocrypha
- Papyrus 46
- Textual criticism
