= Harry Y. Gamble =

American professor emeritus

- Born: 1941
- Occupation: University teacher
- Employer: University of Virginia (1970–2014)

Harry Y. Gamble Jr. (born 1941) is an American professor emeritus within the Department of Religious Studies at the University of Virginia. He retired from full-time teaching in 2014.

== Life ==
=== Education ===
Gamble earned a Bachelor of Arts (BA) at Wake Forest University, a Master of Divinity (MDiv) at Duke University and a Master of Arts (MA) at Yale University. From 1970, Gamble holds a PhD from Yale University. His doctoral dissertation is titled: The textual history of the Letter to the Romans.

=== Teaching ===
In 1970, Gamble joined the Religious Studies Department at the University of Virginia (Professor of New Testament and Early Christianity). From 1992 to 2006, Gamble chaired the department, and he retired from full-time teaching in 2014.

== Contributions ==
His research was on the topic of the development of the New Testament, particularly "the extent of Literacy in early Christian communities; the relation in the early church between Oral tradition and written materials; the physical form of early Christian books; how books were produced, transcribed, published, duplicated, and disseminated; how Christian libraries were formed; who read the books, in what circumstances, and to what purposes."

== Published works ==
=== Thesis ===
- Harry Y Gamble (1970). The textual history of the Letter to the Romans (Dissertation: Ph. D. Yale University). OCLC 2083494.

=== Books ===
- Harry Y Gamble (1970). The Polk family. North Carolina. OCLC 320902221.
- Harry Y Gamble (1977). The textual history of the letter to the Romans: a study in textual and literary criticism. Studies and documents (London, England). Vol. 42. Grand Rapids: Eerdmans. ISBN 9780802816702. OCLC 2986055.
- Harry Y. Gamble (1985). The New Testament canon: its making and meaning. Guides to biblical scholarship., New Testament series. Philadelphia: Fortress Press. ISBN 9780800604707. OCLC 11841376.
- Harry Y Gamble (1989). Waxhaw 100 history: Waxhaw centennial 1989. Waxhaw, N.C. : Waxhaw Centennial Committee. OCLC 47224113.
- Harry Y Gamble (1995). Books and readers in the early church : a history of early Christian texts. Vol. 39. New Haven: Yale University Press. doi:10.1163/1568536974712321. ISBN 9780300069181. OCLC 31436053.
- Harry Y Gamble; Donatella Zoroddu (2006). Introduzione allo studio della Bibbia. Supplementi. 26, Libri e lettori nella chiesa antica. storia dei primi testi cristiani (in Italian). Brescia: Paideia. ISBN 9788839407153. OCLC 889086230.
- Michelle P Brown; Harry Y Gamble; Freer Gallery of Art (Washington, D.C.) (2006). In the beginning: Bibles before the year 1000. Washington, DC: Smithsonian Books. ISBN 9781588342409. OCLC 886816037.
- Harry Y Gamble; Pascale Renaud-Grosbras (October 13, 2012). Livres et lecteurs aux premiers temps du christianisme: usage et production des textes chrétiens antiques. Christianismes antiques (in French). Genève: Labor et fides; Paris: Diff. Presses universitaires de France, impr. 2012. ISBN 9782830914641. OCLC 826752827.
- Harry Y Gamble; Karl Shuve (2018). Books and readers in the premodern world: essays in honor of Harry Gamble. Writings from the Greco-Roman world supplement series, no. 12. Atlanta, GA: SBL Press. ISBN 9780884143314. OCLC 1054265198.
