= Papyrus 49 =

Papyrus 𝔓^{49}
- New Testament manuscript
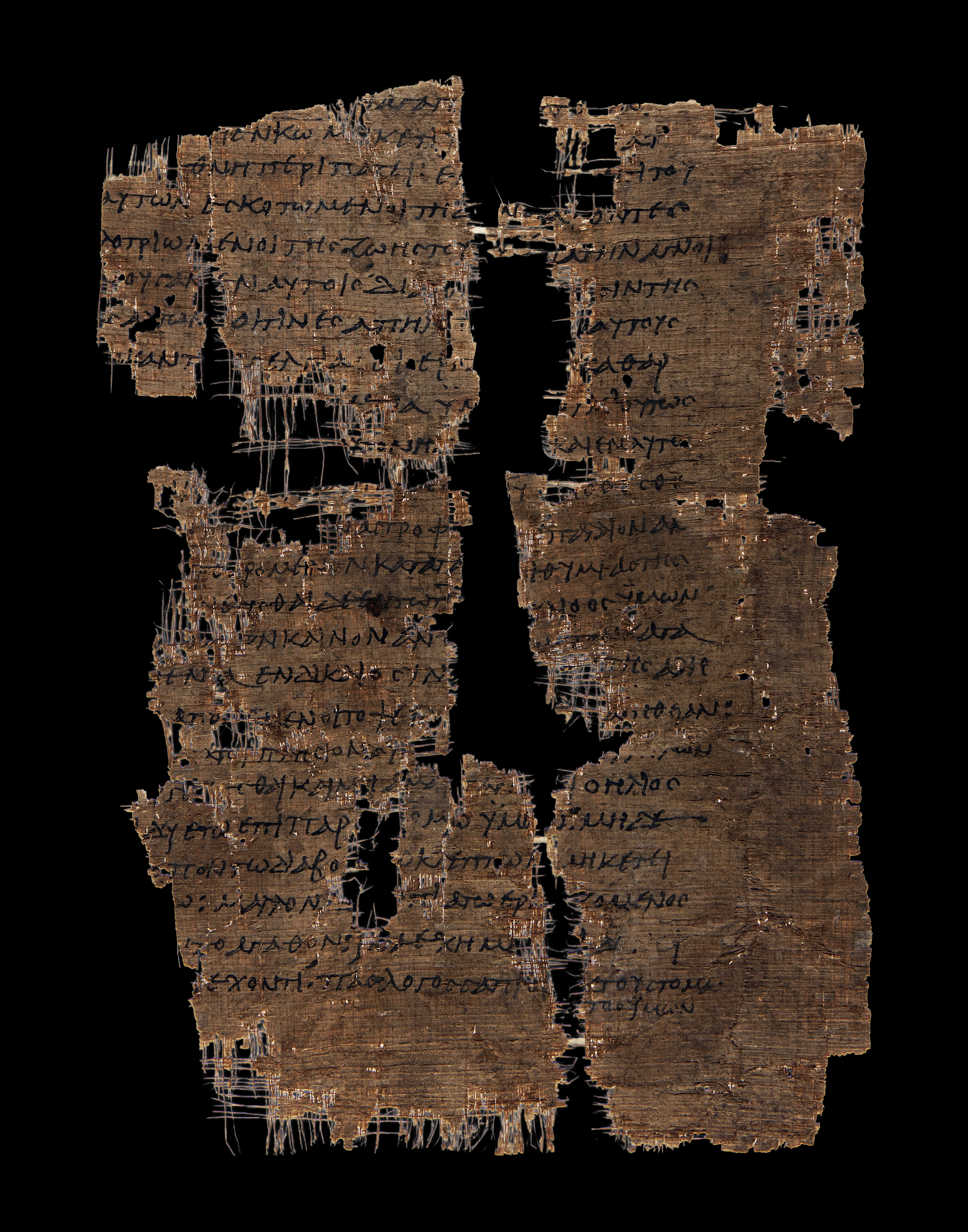
- Recto Ephesians 4:16-29
- Name: Papyrus Yale 415
- Text: Epistle to the Ephesians 4–5 †
- Date: 3rd century
- Script: Greek
- Found: Egypt
- Now at: Yale University Library
- Cite: W. H. P. Hatch and C. B. Welles, A Hitherto Unpublished Fragment of the Epistle to the Ephesians, HTR LI (1958), pp. 33-37.
- Size: 18 x 25
- Type: Alexandrian text-type
- Category: I

Papyrus 49 (Gregory-Aland), designated by 𝔓^{49}, is an early copy of the New Testament in Greek. It is a papyrus manuscript of the Epistle to the Ephesians, surviving in a fragmentary condition. The manuscript has been palaeographically assigned to the 3rd century. It was probably a part of the same manuscript as Papyrus 65. It came from Egypt and was purchased for the Yale University Library. Textually it is close to the Codex Sinaiticus and Codex Vaticanus. The text of the manuscript has been published several times.

== Description ==
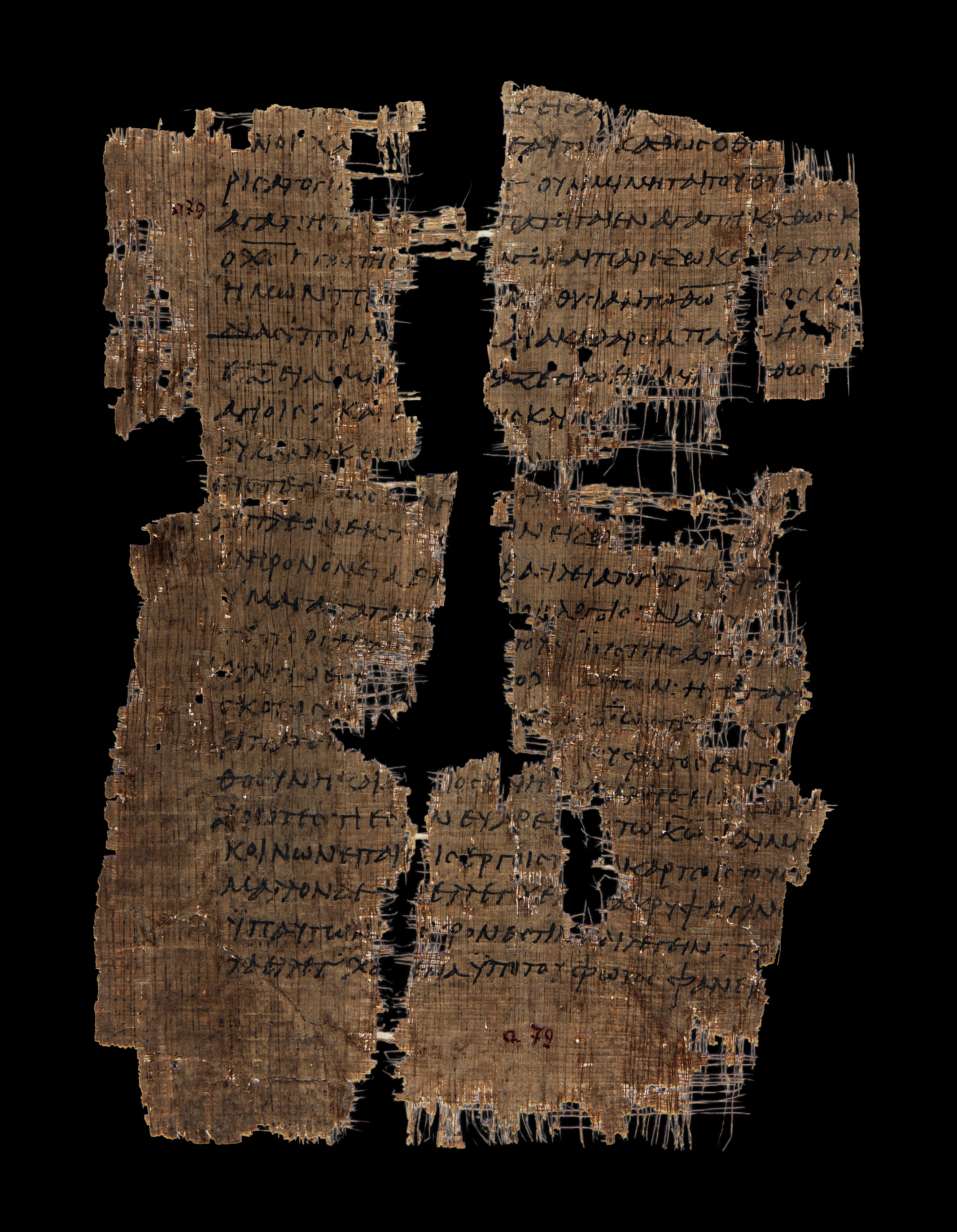
Verso Ephesians 4:31-5:13

The original size of the leaf was 18 centimetres (7.1 in) in height by 25 centimetres (9.8 in) in width. The leaf is damaged at the top, and six lines of its text have been lost. At the present time the leaf measures 20.3 by 13.3 cm (8.0 by 5.2 in). The lower and outer margins are 3 centimetres (1.2 in); the upper and inner margins were lost.

The manuscript has survived in a fragmentary condition and contains the texts of Ephesians 4:16-29; 4:31–5:13. According to Kurt Aland, it is one of three early manuscripts with the text of the Epistle to the Ephesians.

The text is written in one column per page of 29 lines, with 38 letters per line (average). It has no breathings (spiritus asper, spiritus lenis) nor accents. The double point (:) is the only mark of punctuation. The letters are slightly inclined to the right; the writing shows the influence of cursive handwriting. It was written by a professional scribe. The nomina sacra are written in an abbreviated way.

The Greek text of this codex is a representative of the Alexandrian text-type. Aland ascribed it as "at least Normal text", and placed it in Category I. Bruce M. Metzger identifies it as Alexandrian text. According to Philip Comfort and David Barrett the manuscript shows a strong agreement with Codex Sinaiticus and Codex Vaticanus (in 14 out of 16 textual variants).

According to Comfort, 𝔓^{49} and 𝔓^{65} came from the same manuscript. Both manuscripts have the same measurements, and the same number of lines per page. Both were written by a documentary hand, both manifest the same formation of certain letters, such as titled lambda, titled sigma, extended iota, and toiled ypsilon. The nomina sacra and abbreviations are written in the same rather unusual way. Bradford Welles remarks that "there is not a single case of difference in the letter shapes in the two papyri". Neither use ligatures. The only difference is in the number of letters per line: 𝔓^{65} has more letters per line (42). The same situation exists in Papyrus 75. The scribe of 𝔓^{75} appears to have realized that he was running out of room in his codex and added three letters in each line and even added extra lines. The manuscript may be one of the earliest manuscripts to display a complete Pauline codex, along with Papyrus 13, Papyrus 15/Papyrus 16, Papyrus 30, Papyrus 46, and Papyrus 92.

Textual variants

In Ephesians 4:23, 𝔓^{49} has the rare textual reading εν τω πνευματι (in spirit) instead of the reading τω πνευματι (spirit). The reading of the codex is supported by Codex Vaticanus, minuscule 33, 1175, 1739, 1881 and several other manuscripts.

In Ephesians 4:28, it has the unusual textual reading ταις χερσιν το αγαθον, supported only by $\mathfrak{P}^{46}$, second corrector of the Codex Sinaiticus, Codex Vaticanus, Old-Latin a, and vgst. The rest of the manuscripts have the readings: το αγαθον (Porphyrianus, minuscule 6, 33, 1739, 1881); το αγαθον ταις χερσιν (Angelicus, Athous Lavrensis, 323, 326, 614, 630, 945); το αγαθον ταις ιδιαις χερσιν (Codex Mosquensis I, 2495); ταις ιδιαις χερσιν το αγαθον (Codex Sinaiticus, Alexandrinus, Codex Bezae, Augiensis, Boernerianus, 81, 104, 365, 1175, 1241, 2464, vg^{cl}).

In Ephesians 5:4, it has the textual reading και (and), supported by $\mathfrak{P}^{46}$, first corrector of the Codex Sinaiticus (א^{1}), Codex Vaticanus, second corrector of the Codex Bezae, manuscripts of the Byzantine textual tradition, Peshitta, Coptic manuscripts in Bohairic dialect; the other reading η (or) is supported by Codex Sinaiticus, Alexandrinus, Bezae, Augiensis, Boernerianus, Porphyrianus, minuscule 81, 104, 326, 365, 1175, 1241, 1739, 2464, Old-Latin manuscripts, syr^{h}, and Coptic manuscripts in Sahidic dialect.

In Ephesians 5:5, it has the textual reading ο εστιν (who is), supported by the manuscripts: $\mathfrak{P}^{46}$, Sinaiticus, Vaticanus, Augiensis, Boernerianus, Athous Lavrensis, 33, 365, 1175, 1739, 1881, 2464, Old-Latin, Peshitta, Coptic manuscripts (Sahidic and Bohairic); the other reading ος εστιν (who is) is supported by Codex Alexandrinus, Codex Bezae, and manuscripts of the Byzantine textual tradition.

In Ephesians 5:9, it has the textual reading φωτος (light), supported by Codex Sinaiticus, Alexandrinus, Vaticanus, Bezae, Augiensis, Boernerianus, Porphyrianus, minuscule 6, 33, 81, 629, 1175^{c}, 1739, 1881, 2464, some Old-Latin manuscripts, Peshitta and Coptic manuscripts. The reading πνευματος (spirit) is found in the manuscripts $\mathfrak{P}^{46}$, D^{2}, Ψ, majority of the Byzantine manuscripts and syr^{h}.

== History ==
The handwriting of the manuscript displays many third-century features. Comfort dated the manuscript to the middle of the third century. It is presently assigned to the third century on palaeographic grounds by the Institute for New Testament Textual Research (INTF). It was probably written in Egypt, but it cannot be assigned to any particular locality.

The manuscript was purchased in Cairo for Yale University in February 1931. Its provenance prior to Cairo is not known. Currently it is housed at the Yale University Library (P. Yale 415) in New Haven.

The text of the codex was published by William Hatch and Bradford Welles in 1958 (editio princeps). Kurt Aland catalogued the manuscript on the list of the New Testament papyri under the number 49. Susan Stephens gave a new and complete transcription of the codex in 1985. Comfort and Barrett again gave a new reconstruction in 1999.

Vittorio Bartoletti (1920–1990) was the first to note that Papyrus 49 and Papyrus 65 were produced by the same scribe. This conclusion was confirmed by Bradford Welles, Comfort and Barrett, and other palaeographers. They are still catalogued as separate manuscripts on the INTF's list.

== See also ==
- List of New Testament papyri
