= Norman Perrin =

British theologian (1920–1976)

- Born: 29 November 1920; Wellingborough, Northamptonshire, England
- Died: 25 November 1976 (aged 55); Park Forest, Illinois, U.S.

Academic background
- Education: University of London; University of Göttingen

Academic work
- Discipline: Theology; New Testament
- Institutions: University of Chicago
- Doctoral students: Vernon K. Robbins
- Notable works: What is Redaction Criticism?

Norman Perrin (29 November 1920 – 25 November 1976) was an English-born, American biblical scholar at the University of Chicago. Perrin specialized in the study of the New Testament, and was internationally known for his work on the teaching of Jesus, as well as on the Redaction Criticism of the New Testament.

== Life and career ==
Perrin was born in Wellingborough, Northamptonshire, England, and served from 1940 to 1945, during the Second World War, in the Royal Air Force. He earned a Bachelor of Arts degree (in theology) in 1949 from the Victoria University of Manchester. In 1952, he earned a Bachelor of Divinity degree (with honours), and in 1956 a Master of Theology (in Greek New Testament and apocryphal studies), both from the University of London. Perrin was granted his Doctorate of Theology from the University of Göttingen in 1959. From 1959 to 1964, he taught New Testament at the Candler School of Theology, Emory University, and from 1964 until his death in 1976 at the Divinity School of the University of Chicago. Perrin served as president of the Chicago Society of Biblical Research in 1972–1973, and as president of the Society of Biblical Literature in 1973.

== Selected works ==
- Norman Perrin, Norman (1963). The Kingdom of God in the Teaching of Jesus. Philadelphia, PA: Westminster Press. OCLC 3362825.
- ——— (1967). Rediscovering the Teaching of Jesus. New York: Harper & Row. OCLC 382610.
- ——— (1969). The Promise of Bultmann. New York: J. B. Lippincott Company. OCLC 13630.
- ——— (1969). What is Redaction Criticism?. Guides to Biblical Scholarship. Philadelphia, PA: Fortress Press. ISBN 9780800601812. OCLC 27247.
- ——— (1974). A Modern Pilgrimage in New Testament Christology. Philadelphia, PA: Fortress Press. ISBN 9780800602673. OCLC 900843.
- ——— (1974). The New Testament: An Introduction: Proclamation and Parenesis, Myth and History. New York: Harcourt Brace Jovanovich. ISBN 9780155657250. OCLC 900760.
- ——— (1976). Jesus and the Language of the Kingdom: Symbol and Metaphor in New Testament Interpretation. Philadelphia, PA: Fortress Press. ISBN 9780800604127. OCLC 2093387.
- ——— (1977). The Resurrection according to Matthew, Mark, and Luke. Philadelphia, PA: Fortress Press. ISBN 9780800612481. OCLC 2942494.
- ——— (2003). Parable and Gospel. Fortress classics in biblical studies. Minneapolis, MO: Fortress Press. ISBN 9780800635862. OCLC 51342467.

== Bibliography ==
- The Journal of Religion 64 (1984), Norman Perrin 1920-1976; includes a previously unpublished essay by Perrin and academic tributes by colleagues.
- David Abernathy, Understanding the Teaching of Jesus: Based on the Lecture Series of Norman Perrin (New York : Seabury Press, 1983).
- Calvin R. Mercer, "Norman Perrin: A Scholarly Pilgrim" (Ph.D. dissertation, Florida State University, 1983).
- Welton O. Seal, Jr., "Norman Perrin and His 'School': Retracing a Pilgrimage", Journal for the Study of the New Testament (1984), pp. 87–107.
- Welton O. Seal, Jr., "The Parousia in Mark: A Debate with Norman Perrin and 'His School'" (Ph.D. dissertation, Union Theological Seminary, 1981).
- Criterion, vol. 16, no. 1 (Winter 1977); personal tributes to Norman Perrin, from a memorial service held in the Joseph Bond Chapel, 30 November 1976
