= Ephesians 1 =

- ← Galatians 6 chapter 2 →
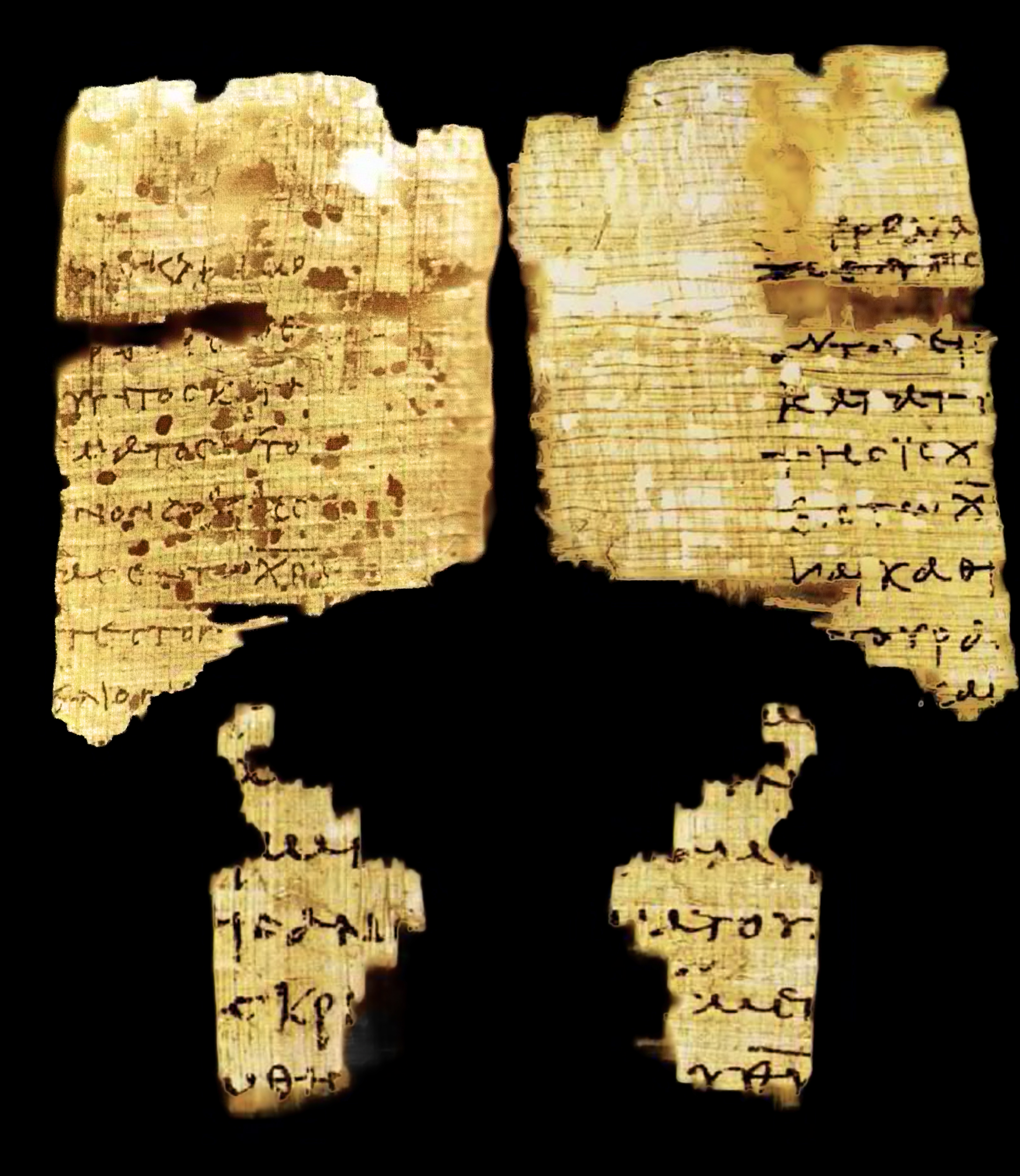
- A fragment showing Ephesians 1:11-13 on Papyrus 92 from ca. AD 300.
- Book: Epistle to the Ephesians
- Category: Pauline epistles
- Christian Bible part: New Testament
- Order in the Christian part: 10

Rome and Ephesus in the Mediterranean

Ephesians 1 is the first chapter of the Epistle to the Ephesians in the New Testament of the Christian Bible. Traditionally, it is believed to have been written by Apostle Paul while he was in prison in Rome (around AD 62), but more recently, it has been suggested that it was written between AD 80 and 100 by another writer using Paul's name and style. This chapter contains the greeting, followed by a section about "The Blessing of God" and Paul's prayer.

== Text ==
The original text was written in Koine Greek. This chapter is divided into 23 verses.

=== Textual witnesses ===
Some early manuscripts containing the text of this chapter are:

- Papyrus 46 (~AD 200)
- Papyrus 92 (~300; extant verses 11–13,19–21)
- Codex Vaticanus (325–50)
- Codex Sinaiticus (330–60)
- Codex Alexandrinus (400–40)
- Codex Claromontanus (~550)

=== Old Testament references ===
- Ephesians 1:22: Psalm 8:6

=== New Testament references ===
- Ephesians 1:22: 1 Corinthians 15:27

== Greeting (1:1–2) ==
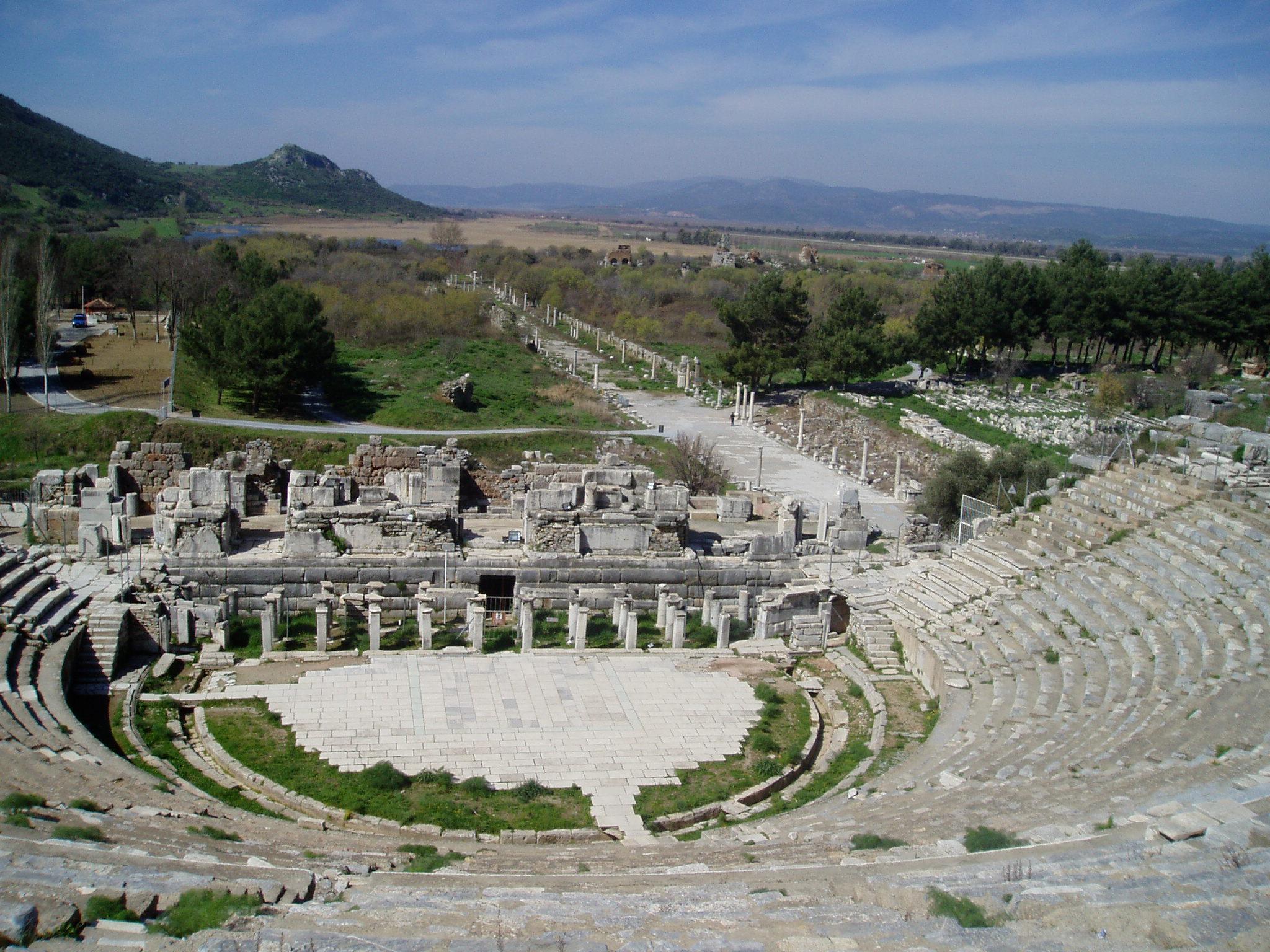
Ruins of Ephesus amphitheater with the harbor street leading to the coastline (2004).

The greeting of this epistle follows the typical of Paul's usual address format, "X to Y, greeting" (in Greek style) or "peace" (in Jewish style).

=== Verse 1 ===
Paul, an apostle of Jesus Christ by the will of God,

To the saints who are in Ephesus, and faithful in Christ Jesus:

While English translations indicate that the letter was addressed to "the saints who are in Ephesus", the words "in Ephesus" do not appear in Papyrus 46, one of the earliest manuscripts containing this epistle. (Note: The words "in Ephesus" (εν εφεσω) were added to the original text of Codex Sinaiticus and Vaticanus by later hands.) See the section on the place, date, and purpose of the writing of the letter in the article on Epistle to the Ephesians for more details.

=== Verse 2 ===
Grace to you and peace from God our Father and the Lord Jesus Christ.

== The Blessing of God (1:3–14) ==
Theologian James Dunn considers this section "one of the most beautiful passages in the Bible" among Christian praise, "unlike anything else in Pauline letters". The Greek text of this part can be punctuated as a single sentence. It contains a four-dimensional blessing, sketched a circle starting from God and directing to God as the source and resource of it, reaching from the time "before the foundation of the world" (verse 4), into the revelation of the divine mystery (verse 9), until the end of time ("the fullness of time") to "sum up everything in Christ" (verse 10) with "the Spirit as the guarantee" of "the final redemption of God's own possession" (verse 14).

=== Verse 3 ===
Blessed be the God and Father of our Lord Jesus Christ, who has blessed us with every spiritual blessing in the heavenly places in Christ.

A rhetorical antanaclasis: God has blessed us in one sense, we bless Him in another; an "ingenious correlation of the passive εὐλογητός (eulogētos) and the active εὐλογήσας (eulogēsas)".

=== Verse 13 ===
In Him you also trusted, after you heard the word of truth, the gospel of your salvation; in whom also, having believed, you were sealed with the Holy Spirit of promise,

- "In Him you also trusted" (KJV: "In whom ye also trusted"): The same promise, grace and privileges belonged to all that God called, both the believing Jews and the Gentile believers in Ephesus, whom Paul particularly addresses; as they were saved by the same Christ, and were "heirs of the same inheritance". Codex Alexandrinus alone reads "we" (ημεις), instead of "you". (Note: Corrector 2a of Codex Sinaiticus also wrote "we" (ημεις) to correct the original "you" (υμις), but then another corrector (2b) corrected back to "you" (υμεις), which is the exact word found in all other Greek manuscripts.)
- "The word of truth" here refers to "the Gospel of your salvation", while the Jews use the phrase for "sublime and heavenly doctrine". Paul uses it to denote the "declaration and publication of salvation by Christ", in which they believed after hearing it.
- "You were sealed with the Holy Spirit of promise": this is to be understood as the action of the Spirit who confirms, certifies, and assures the believers of their interest in God's favor, as well as the blessings of grace and their right to the heavenly glory (cf. 2 Corinthians 1:22). This seal is not circumcision, baptism, the Holy Communion/Lord's supper, nor the graces of the Spirit, but the Spirit himself, who conveys the truth to the spirits of believers, and as a "spirit of promise" – that is, the Spirit who is promised by Father and Christ, and who is sent by them – the Holy Spirit seals or certifies believers about the truth of the things above, by opening and applying the promise to them, to leave a greater impression of holiness on the soul, and more acts of holiness. This cannot be the same as the seal of the Father for his elected people ("the seal of his foreknowledge"; 2 Timothy 2:19) because that was before faith, and is within himself, not on them, thus it is different from the Spirit's work. For the same reasons, it cannot be the Son's affection to the people, placing them as "a seal on his arm and his heart" (Song of Solomon 8:6), or his asserting in them as his property, as well as their security and protection (Song of Solomon 4:12; Revelation 7:3). Neither can it be the Spirit's finishing and completing the work of grace on the soul (Romans 15:28) for this was not yet done on the believers in Ephesus, nor the confirming of the Gospel and the believers in it, by the special effusion of the Spirit on the day of Pentecost, or by his extraordinary works on the ministry of the word to establish it, and the faith of men in it, since these were not common to believers, whereas the believing Ephesians were sealed; while the Spirit of God still continues as a sealer of his people, as an earnest pledge of their inheritance until the day of redemption comes.

=== Verse 14 ===
who is the guarantee of our inheritance until the redemption of the purchased possession, to the praise of His glory.

- "Who is the guarantee of our inheritance.": Some ancient manuscripts read ὅ ἐστιν ἀρραβὼν whereas Textus Receptus and Byzantine/Majority texts read ὅς ἐστιν ἀρραβὼν.
- "The purchased possession": translated from the Greek word περιποιήσεως, peripoiēseōs, in the sense of "acquired possession". Of the five occurrences of the word in the New Testament (Ephesians 1:14; 1 Thessalonians 5:9; 2 Thessalonians 2:14; Hebrews 10:39; 1 Peter 2:9), three of these instances have the active sense (1 Thessalonians 5:9, περιποίησιν σωτηρίας; 2 Thessalonians 2:14, περιποίησιν δόξης; Hebrews 10:39, περιποίησιν ψυχῆς).
- "Guarantee": "down-payment, earnest"

== Paul's Prayer (1:15–23) ==
This section contains the thanksgiving and prayer for the receivers of this epistle, concerning their "faith in the Lord Jesus" and the love of all believers, followed by a hope in "the working of the great might of God".

=== Verse 16 ===
I do not cease to give thanks for you, making mention of you in my prayers.

Lutheran theologian Johann Bengel suggests that "Paul made mention of all the churches in his prayers" (or at least of all the churches with which he was associated) as is similarly stated in Colossians 1:3 and 1:9.

== See also ==
- Ephesus
- Jesus Christ
- Paul of Tarsus
- Related Bible parts: 2 Corinthians 1, Ephesians 2

== Bibliography ==
- Dunn, J. D. G. (2007). "68. Ephesians". In Barton, John; Muddiman, John (eds.). The Oxford Bible Commentary (paperback) (1st ed.). Oxford University Press. pp. 1165–79. ISBN 978-0-19927718-6.
