= Epistle to the Ephesians =

Book of the New Testament

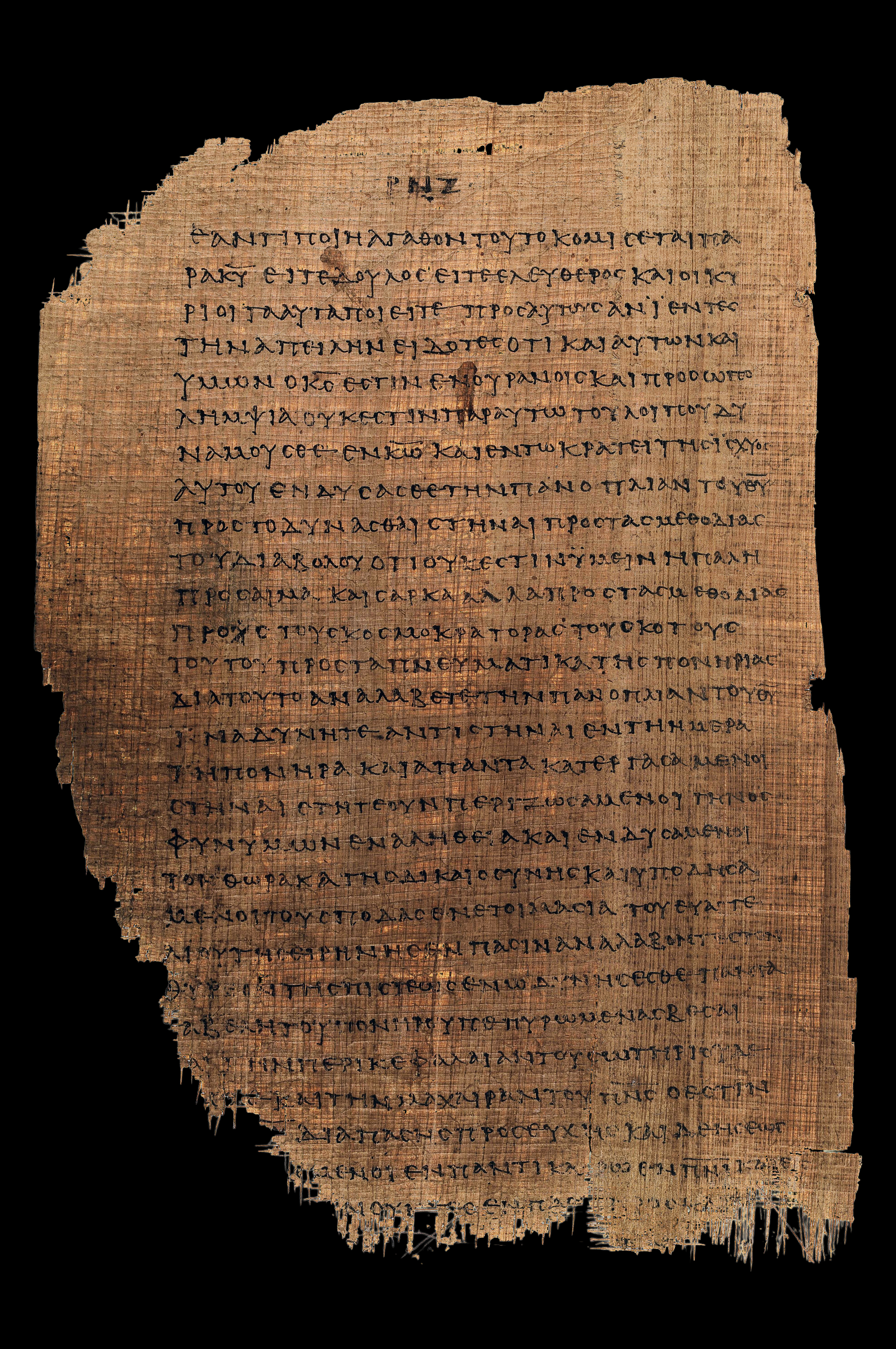
Ephesians 6:8–18 on Papyrus 46 (fol. 157 verso; c. AD 200)

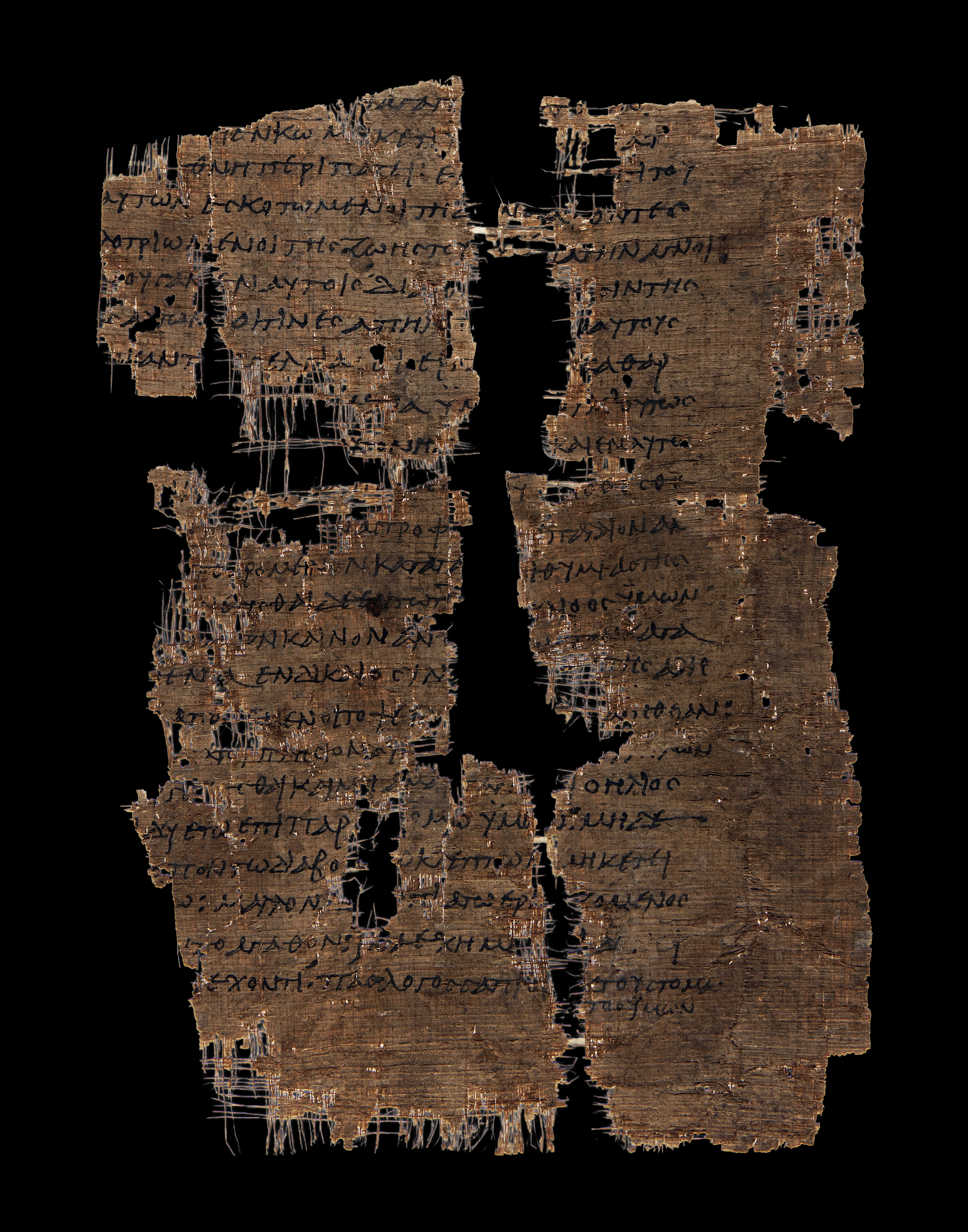
Papyrus 49, a 3rd-century manuscript of the Epistle to the Ephesians

The Epistle to the Ephesians (Note: The book is sometimes called the Letter of Paul to the Ephesians, or simply Ephesians. It is most commonly abbreviated as "Eph.") is a Pauline epistle and the tenth book of the New Testament of the Christian Bible. It stands among the canonical writings that shaped early Christian identity and is traditionally grouped with the letters attributed to Paul the Apostle.

The text is traditionally believed to have been written by Paul around AD 62 during his imprisonment in Rome. It is thought to have been addressed to the church in Ephesus (now in Turkey) and closely resembles Colossians, another Pauline epistle whose authorship is debated. As such, many modern scholars dispute the attribution and date the work to AD 70–100 as a circular letter.

Ephesians sets out a theological vision of God's plan to unite all creation in Christ and exhorts the church to embody that unity through reconciliation across ethnic boundaries and holy conduct in everyday relationships.

== Themes ==
According to New Testament scholar Daniel Wallace, the theme may be stated pragmatically as "Christians, get along with each other! Maintain the unity practically which Christ has effected positionally by his death."

Another major theme in Ephesians is the keeping of Christ's body (that is, the Church) pure and holy.

In the second part of the letter, Ephesians 4:17–6:20, the author gives practical advice in how to live a holy, pure, and Christ-inspired lifestyle.

== Composition ==
According to tradition, the Apostle Paul wrote the letter while he was in prison in Rome (around AD 62). This would be about the same time as the Epistle to the Colossians (which in many points it resembles) and the Epistle to Philemon. However, many critical scholars have questioned the authorship of the letter and suggest that it may have been written after Paul’s death.

=== Authorship ===
The first verse in the letter identifies Paul as its author. While early lists of New Testament books, including the Muratorian fragment and possibly Marcion's canon (if it is to be equated with the Epistle to the Laodiceans), attribute the letter to Paul, more recently there have been challenges to Pauline authorship on the basis of the letter's characteristically non-Pauline syntax, terminology, and eschatology.

Biblical scholar Harold Hoehner, surveying 279 commentaries written between 1519 and 2001, found that 54% favored Pauline authorship, 39% concluded against Pauline authorship and 7% remained uncertain. Norman Perrin and Dennis C. Duling found that of six authoritative scholarly references, "four of the six decide for pseudonymity, and the other two (Peake's Commentary on the Bible and the Jerome Biblical Commentary) recognize the difficulties in maintaining Pauline authorship. Indeed, the difficulties are insurmountable." Bible scholar Raymond E. Brown asserts that about 80% of critical scholarship judges that Paul did not write Ephesians. A survey of 109 scholars at the British New Testament Conference in 2011 found 39 in favor of authenticity, while 42 rejected Pauline authorship and 28 were uncertain.

There are four main theories in biblical scholarship that address the question of Pauline authorship.

- The traditional view that the epistle is written by Paul is supported by scholars that include Ezra Abbot, Ragnar Asting, Markus Barth, F. F. Bruce, A. Robert, and André Feuillet, Gaugler, Grant, Harnack, Haupt, Fenton John Anthony Hort, Klijn, Johann David Michaelis, A. Van Roon, Sanders, Schille, Klyne Snodgrass, John R. W. Stott, Frank Thielman, Daniel B. Wallace, Brooke Foss Westcott, and Theodor Zahn. For a defense of the Pauline authorship of Ephesians, see Ephesians: An Exegetical Commentary, Harold Hoehner, pp. 2–61.
- A second position suggests that Ephesians was dictated by Paul with interpolations from another author. Some of the scholars that espouse this view include Albertz, Benoit, Cerfaux, Goguel, Harrison, H. J. Holtzmann, Murphy-O'Connor, and Wagenführer.
- A third group thinks it improbable that Paul authored Ephesians. Among this group are Allan, Beare, Brandon, Rudolf Bultmann, Conzelmann, Dibelius, Goodspeed, Kilsemann, J. Knox, W.L. Knox, Kümmel, K and S Lake, Marxsen, Masson, Mitton, Moffatt, Nineham, Pokorny, Schweizer, and J. Weiss.
- Still other scholars suggest there is a lack of conclusive evidence. Some of this group are Cadbury, Julicher, McNeile, and Williams.

=== Place, date, and purpose of the writing of the letter ===
While most English translations begin by including that the letter was addressed to "the saints who are in Ephesus" (1:1), the words "in Ephesus" do not appear in the best and earliest manuscripts of the letter, which may have been the reason why the first New Testament corpus identified it as the Epistle to the Laodiceans. Moreover, the author addresses the Ephesians as a community that he does not have a personal relationship with; he does not greet anybody by name, and he does not refer to any specific circumstance of the community. All of this conflicts with the account of Paul staying in Ephesus for more than two years, which is recorded in the Book of Acts.

For these reasons, textual critics like Bart Ehrman regard "in Ephesus" as a later interpolation, though most believe that the letter as a whole is a circular letter intended for many churches. According to the Jerusalem Bible, some critics think that the words "who are [in]" would have been followed by a blank where one would write the place of the church that is receiving the letter.

If it is accepted that Paul is the author of the letter, then it was probably written from Rome during Paul's first imprisonment, and probably soon after his arrival there in 62 (CE), which is four years after he had parted with the Ephesian elders at Miletus. However, scholars who dispute Pauline authorship date the letter to 70-80 (CE). In the latter case, a possible location of composition could have been the Church in Ephesus itself. Ignatius of Antioch in the 2nd-century (CE) seems to have been well-acquainted with Ephesians, and he parallels many of his own thoughts with its contents.

== Outline ==
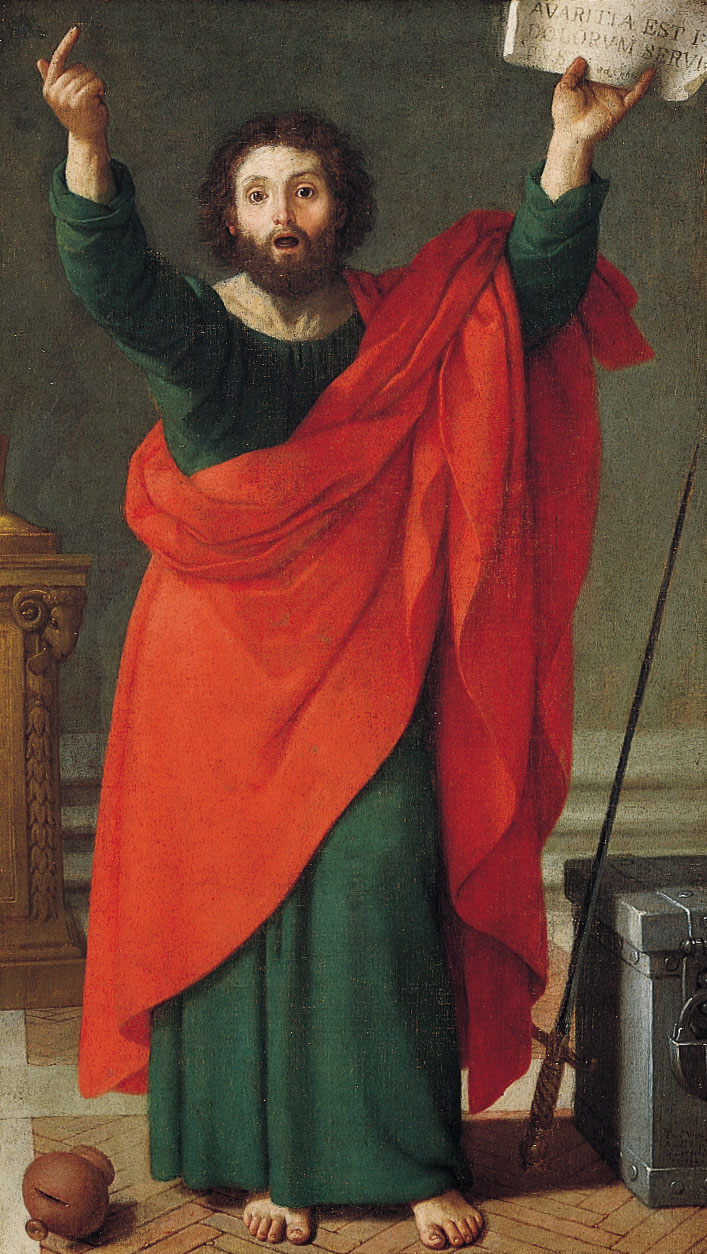
Saint Paul, 1740, by Vieira Lusitano. The saint is depicted preaching, holding an excerpt from the Epistle to the Ephesians ("avaritia est idolorum servitus", Eph. 5:5) in his left hand.

Ephesians contains:

- Ephesians 1:1–2. The greeting, from Paul to the church of Ephesus.
- Ephesians 1:3–2:10. A general account of the blessings that the gospel reveals. This includes the source of these blessings, the means by which they are attained, the reason why they are given, and their final result. The whole of the section Ephesians 1:3–23 consists in the original Greek of just two lengthy and complex sentences. It ends with a fervent prayer for the further spiritual enrichment of the Ephesians.
- Ephesians 2:11–3:21. A description of the change in the spiritual position of Gentiles as a result of the work of Christ. It ends with an account of how Paul was selected and qualified to be an apostle to the Gentiles, in the hope that this will keep them from being dispirited and lead him to pray for them.
- Ephesians 4:1–16. A chapter on unity in the midst of the diversity of gifts among believers.
- Ephesians 4:17–6:9. Instructions about ordinary life and different relationships.
- Ephesians 6:10–24. The imagery of spiritual warfare (including the metaphor of the Armor of God), the mission of Tychicus, and valedictory blessings.

== Founding of the church at Ephesus ==
Paul's first and hurried visit for the space of three months to Ephesus is recorded in Acts 18:19–21. The work he began on this occasion was carried forward by Apollos and Aquila and Priscilla. On his second visit early in the following year, he remained at Ephesus "three years", for he found it was the key to the western provinces of Asia Minor. Here "a great door and effectual" was opened to him, and the church was established and strengthened by his diligent labours there. From Ephesus the gospel spread abroad "almost throughout all Asia." The word "mightily grew and prevailed" despite all the opposition and persecution he encountered.

On his last journey to Jerusalem, the apostle landed at Miletus and, summoning together the elders of the church from Ephesus, delivered to them a farewell charge, expecting to see them no more.

The following parallels between this epistle and the Milesian charge may be traced:

1. Acts 20:19 = Ephesians 4:2. The phrase "lowliness of mind".
2. Acts 20:27 = Ephesians 1:11. The word "counsel", denoting the divine plan.
3. Acts 20:32 = Ephesians 3:20. The divine ability.
4. Acts 20:32 = Ephesians 2:20. The building upon the foundation.
5. Acts 20:32 = Ephesians 1:14,18 "The inheritance of the saints."

== Purpose ==
The purpose of the epistle, and to whom it was written, are matters of much speculation. It was regarded by C.H. Dodd as the "crown of Paulinism." In general, it is born out of its particular socio-historical context and the situational context of both the author and the audience. Originating in the circumstance of a multicultural church (primarily Jewish and Hellenistic), the author addressed issues appropriate to the diverse religious and cultural backgrounds present in the community.

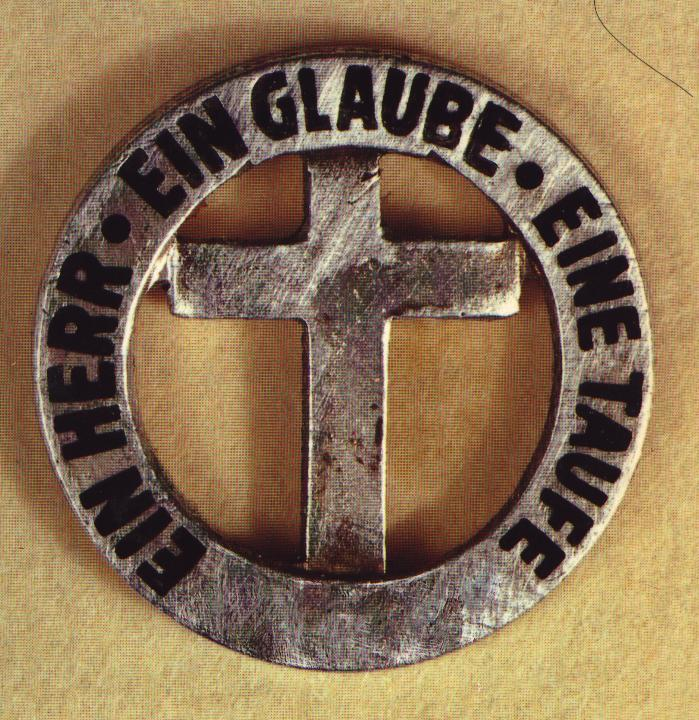
German inscription of the text, "One Lord, One faith, One baptism," (Ephesians 4:5).

The author exhorts the church repeatedly to embrace a specific view of salvation, which he then explicates.

Frank Charles Thompson argues that the main theme of Ephesians is in response to the newly converted Jews who often separated themselves from their Gentile brethren. The unity of the church, especially between Jew and Gentile believers, is the keynote of the book.

== Interpretations ==
Ephesians is notable for its domestic code treatment in Ephesians 5:22–6:9, covering husband-wife, parent-child, and master-slave relationships. In Ephesians 5:22, wives are urged to submit to their husbands, and husbands to love their wives "as Christ loved the Church." Christian Egalitarian theologians, such as Katharine Bushnell and Jessie Penn-Lewis, interpret these commands in the context of the preceding verse, for all Christians to "submit to one another." Thus, it is two-way, mutual submission of both husbands to wives and wives to husbands. But according to Peter O'Brien, professor emeritus at Moore Theological College, this would be the only instance of this meaning of submission in the whole New Testament, indeed in any extant comparable Greek texts; by O'Brien's account, the word simply does not connote mutuality. Dallas Theological Seminary professor Daniel Wallace understands it to be an extension of Ephesians 5:15-21 on being filled by the Holy Spirit.

== See also ==
- Earlier Epistle to the Ephesians
- Textual variants in the Epistle to the Ephesians

== Notes ==
Epistle to the Ephesians Pauline Prison Epistle
Preceded by Galatians	New Testament; Books of the Bible	Succeeded by Philippians
