= Holy Spirit in Christianity =

Third person of the Trinity

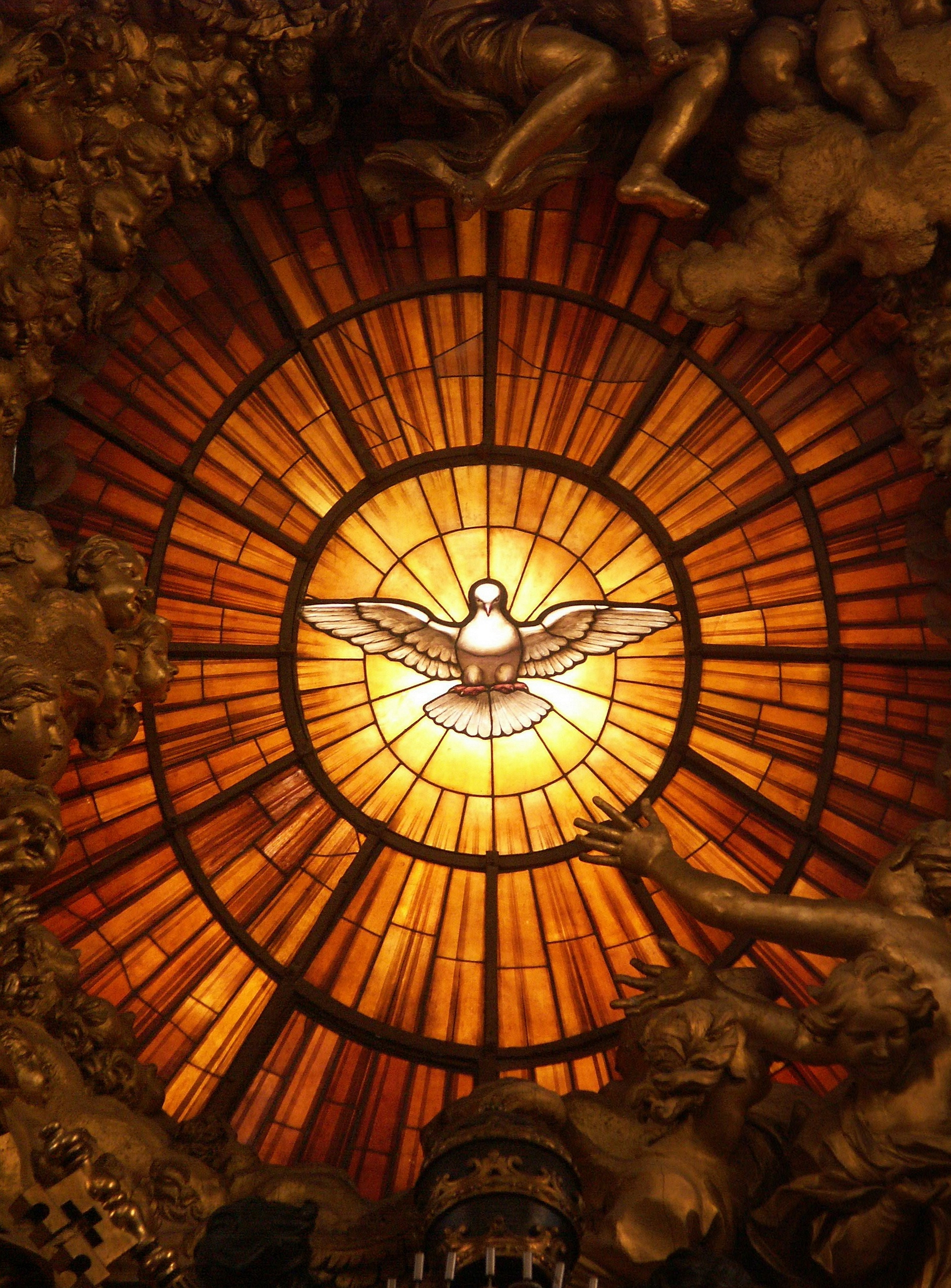
Stained glass representation of the Holy Spirit as a dove in St. Peter's Basilica, c. 1660

In mainstream Trinitarian Christianity, the Holy Spirit or Holy Ghost (Greek: Ἅγιον Πνεῦμα, Latin: Spiritus Sanctus) is the third Person of the Trinity, which is often enumerated as God the Father, God the Son (Jesus Christ), and God the Holy Spirit. Nontrinitarian Christians, who reject the doctrine of the Trinity, differ significantly from mainstream Christianity in their beliefs about the Holy Spirit. In Christian theology, pneumatology is the study of the Holy Spirit. Due to Christianity's historical relationship with Judaism, theologians often identify the Holy Spirit with the concept of the Ruach Hakodesh in Jewish scripture, on the theory that Jesus was expanding upon these Jewish concepts. Similar names, and ideas, include the Ruach Elohim (Spirit of God) and Ruach YHWH (Spirit of Yahweh). In the New Testament the Holy Spirit is identified with the Spirit of Christ, the Spirit of Truth, and the Paraclete (helper).

The New Testament details a close relationship between the Holy Spirit and Jesus during his earthly life and ministry. The Gospels of Matthew and Luke and the Nicene Creed state that Jesus was "conceived by the Holy Spirit, born of the Virgin Mary". The Holy Spirit descended on Jesus like a dove during his baptism, and in his Farewell Discourse after the Last Supper, Jesus promised to send the Holy Spirit to his disciples after his departure.

The Holy Spirit is referred to as "the Lord, the Giver of Life" in the Nicene Creed, which summarises several key beliefs held by many Christian denominations. The participation of the Holy Spirit in the tripartite nature of conversion is apparent in Jesus' final post-resurrection instruction to his disciples at the end of the Gospel of Matthew, "Make disciples of all the nations, baptizing them into the name of the Father and of the Son and of the Holy Spirit." Since the first century, Christians have also called upon God with the trinitarian formula "Father, Son and Holy Spirit" in prayer, absolution and benediction. In the book of the Acts of the Apostles the arrival of the Holy Spirit happens fifty days after the resurrection of the Christ, and is celebrated in Christendom with the feast of Pentecost.

== Etymology and usage ==
The Koine Greek word pneûma (πνεῦμα, pneuma) is found around 385 times in the New Testament, with some scholars differing by three to nine occurrences. Pneuma appears 105 times in the four canonical gospels, 69 times in the Acts of the Apostles, 161 times in the Pauline epistles, and 50 times elsewhere. These usages vary: in 133 cases it refers to "spirit" and in 153 cases to "spiritual". Around 93 times, the reference is to the Holy Spirit, sometimes under the name pneuma and sometimes explicitly as the pneûma tò Hagion (Πνεῦμα τὸ Ἅγιον). (In a few cases it is also simply used generically to mean wind or life.) It was generally translated into the Vulgate as Spiritus and Spiritus Sanctus.

The English terms "Holy Ghost" and "Holy Spirit" are complete synonyms: one derives from the Old English gast and the other from the Latin loanword spiritus. Like pneuma, they both refer to the breath, to its animating power, and to the soul. The Old English term is shared by all other Germanic languages (compare, e.g., the German Geist) and it is older; the King James Bible typically uses "Holy Ghost". Beginning in the 20th century, translations overwhelmingly prefer "Holy Spirit", partly because the general English term "ghost" has increasingly come to refer only to the spirit of a dead person.

== Names ==
=== Hebrew Bible ===
- וְר֣וּחַ קָדְשׁ֑וֹ (rûaḥ qodšô) – His Holy Spirit (Isaiah 63:10)
- וְר֣וּחַ קָ֝דְשְׁךָ֗ (rûaḥ qodšəkā) – Your Holy Spirit (Psalm 51:11)
- וְר֣וּחַ אֱלֹהִ֔ים (rûaḥ ĕlōhîm) – Spirit of God (Genesis 1:2)
- נִשְׁמַת־ר֨וּחַ חַיִּ֜ים (nišmat-rûaḥ ḥayyîm) – The Breath of the Spirit of Life (Genesis 7:22)
- ר֣וּחַ יְהוָ֑ה (rûaḥ YHWH) – Spirit of YHWH (Isaiah 11:2)
- ר֧וּחַ חָכְמָ֣ה וּבִינָ֗ה (rûaḥ ḥokmâ ûbînâ) – Spirit of Wisdom and Understanding (Isaiah 11:2)
- ר֤וּחַ עֵצָה֙ וּגְבוּרָ֔ה (rûaḥ ʿēṣâ ûgəbûra) – Spirit of Counsel and Might (Isaiah 11:2)
- ר֥וּחַ דַּ֖עַת וְיִרְאַ֥ת יְהוָֽה (rûaḥ daʿat wəyīrəʾat YHWH) – Spirit of Knowledge and Fear of YHWH (Isaiah 11:2)

=== New Testament ===
- πνεύματος ἁγίου (Pneumatos Hagiou) – Holy Spirit (Matthew 1:18)
- πνεύματι θεοῦ (Pneumati Theou) – Spirit of God (Matthew 12:28)
- ὁ παράκλητος (Ho Paraclētos) – The Comforter, cf. Paraclete John 14:26 (John 16:7)
- πνεῦμα τῆς ἀληθείας (Pneuma tēs Alētheias) – Spirit of Truth (John 16:13)
- Πνεῦμα Χριστοῦ (Pneuma Christou) – Spirit of Christ (1 Peter 1:11)

Depending on context:

- πνεῦμα (Pneuma) – Spirit (John 3:8)
- Πνεύματος (Pneumatos) – Spirit (John 3:8)

== Biblical portrayal ==
=== Old Testament ===
What the Hebrew Bible calls "Spirit of God" and "Spirit of Elohim" is called in the Talmud and Midrash "Holy Spirit" (ruacḥ ha-kodesh). Although the expression "Holy Spirit" occurs in Ps. 51:11 and in Isa. 63:10–11, it had not yet acquired quite the same meaning which was attached to it in rabbinical literature: in the latter it is equivalent to the expression "Spirit of the Lord". In Gen.1:2 God's spirit hovered over the form of lifeless matter, thereby making the Creation possible. Although the ruach ha-kodesh may be named instead of God, it was conceived of as being something distinct; and, like everything earthly that comes from heaven, the ruach ha-kodesh is composed of light and fire. The most characteristic sign of the presence of the ruach ha-kodesh is the gift of prophecy. The use of the word "ruach" (Hebrew: "breath", or "wind") in the phrase ruach ha-kodesh seems to suggest that Judaic authorities believed the Holy Spirit was a kind of communication medium like the wind. The spirit talks sometimes with a masculine and sometimes with a feminine voice; the word ruacḥ is both masculine and feminine.

=== New Testament ===
The term Holy Spirit appears at least 90 times in the New Testament. The sacredness of the Holy Spirit to Christians is affirmed in all three Synoptic Gospels, which proclaim that blasphemy against the Holy Spirit is the unforgivable sin. The participation of the Holy Spirit in the Trinity is suggested in Jesus' final post-Resurrection instruction to his disciples at the end of the Gospel of Matthew (28:19): "Go ye therefore, and make disciples of all the nations, baptizing them into the name of the Father and of the Son and of the Holy Spirit".

==== Synoptic Gospels ====
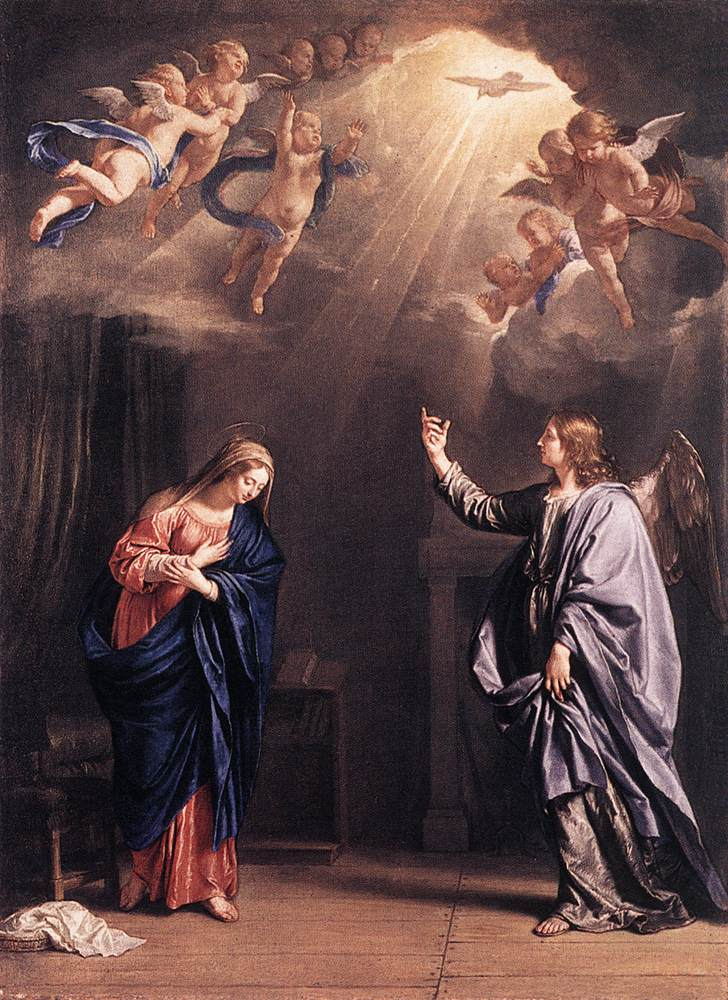
The Holy Spirit as a dove in The Annunciation, by Philippe de Champaigne, 1644

The Holy Spirit is mentioned by all three authors of the synoptic Gospels. Most of the references are by the author of the Gospel of Luke; this emphasis is continued by the same author in the Book of Acts.

The Holy Spirit does not simply appear for the first time at Pentecost after the resurrection of Jesus, but is present in Luke (in chapters 1 and 2) prior to the birth of Jesus. In Luke 1:15, John the Baptist was said to be "filled with the Holy Spirit" prior to his birth, and the Holy Spirit came upon the Virgin Mary in Luke 1:35. Later, in Luke 3:16, John the Baptist stated that Jesus baptized not with water but with the Holy Spirit, and the Holy Spirit descended on Jesus during his baptism in the Jordan River. In Luke 11:13, Jesus provided assurances that God the Father would "give the Holy Spirit to those who ask him".

Mark 13:11 specifically refers to the power of the Holy Spirit to act and speak through the disciples of Jesus in time of need: "Be not anxious beforehand what ye shall speak: but whatsoever shall be given you in that hour, that speak ye; for it is not ye that speak, but the Holy Spirit." Matthew 10:20 refers to the same act of speaking through the disciples, but uses the term "Spirit of your Father".

==== Acts of the Apostles ====
The Acts of the Apostles has sometimes been called the "Book of the Holy Spirit" or the "Acts of the Holy Spirit". Of the seventy or so occurrences of the word Pneuma in Acts, fifty-five refer to the Holy Spirit.

From the start, in Acts 1:2, the reader is reminded that the ministry of Jesus, while he was on earth, was carried out through the power of the Holy Spirit and that the "acts of the apostles" continue the acts of Jesus and are also facilitated by the Holy Spirit. Acts presents the Holy Spirit as the "life principle" of the early Church and provides five separate and dramatic instances of its outpouring on believers in Acts 2:1–4, 4:28–31, 8:15–17, 10:44, and 19:6.

References to the Holy Spirit appear throughout Acts, for example Acts 1:5 and 8 stating towards the beginning, "For John indeed baptized with water; but ye shall be baptized in the Holy Spirit. ...Ye shall receive power, when the Holy Spirit is come upon you", referring to the fulfillment of the prophecy of John the Baptist in Luke 3:16, "he shall baptize you in the Holy Spirit".

The Holy Spirit was first bestowed upon the Gentiles in Caesarea Maritima (Acts 10:1–8, 44–48).

==== Johannine literature ====
Three separate terms, namely Holy Spirit, Spirit of Truth and Paraclete are used in the Johannine writings. The "Spirit of Truth" is used in John 14:17, 15:26, and 16:13. The First Epistle of John then contrasts this with the "spirit of error" in 1 John 4:6. 1 John 4:1–6 provides the separation between spirits "that confesseth that Jesus Christ is come in the flesh is of God" and those who in error refuse it – an indication of their being evil spirits.

In John 14:26, Jesus states: "But the Comforter, [even] the Holy Spirit, whom the Father will send in my name, he shall teach you all things". The identity of the "Comforter" has been the subject of debate among theologians, who have proposed multiple theories on the matter.

==== Pauline epistles ====
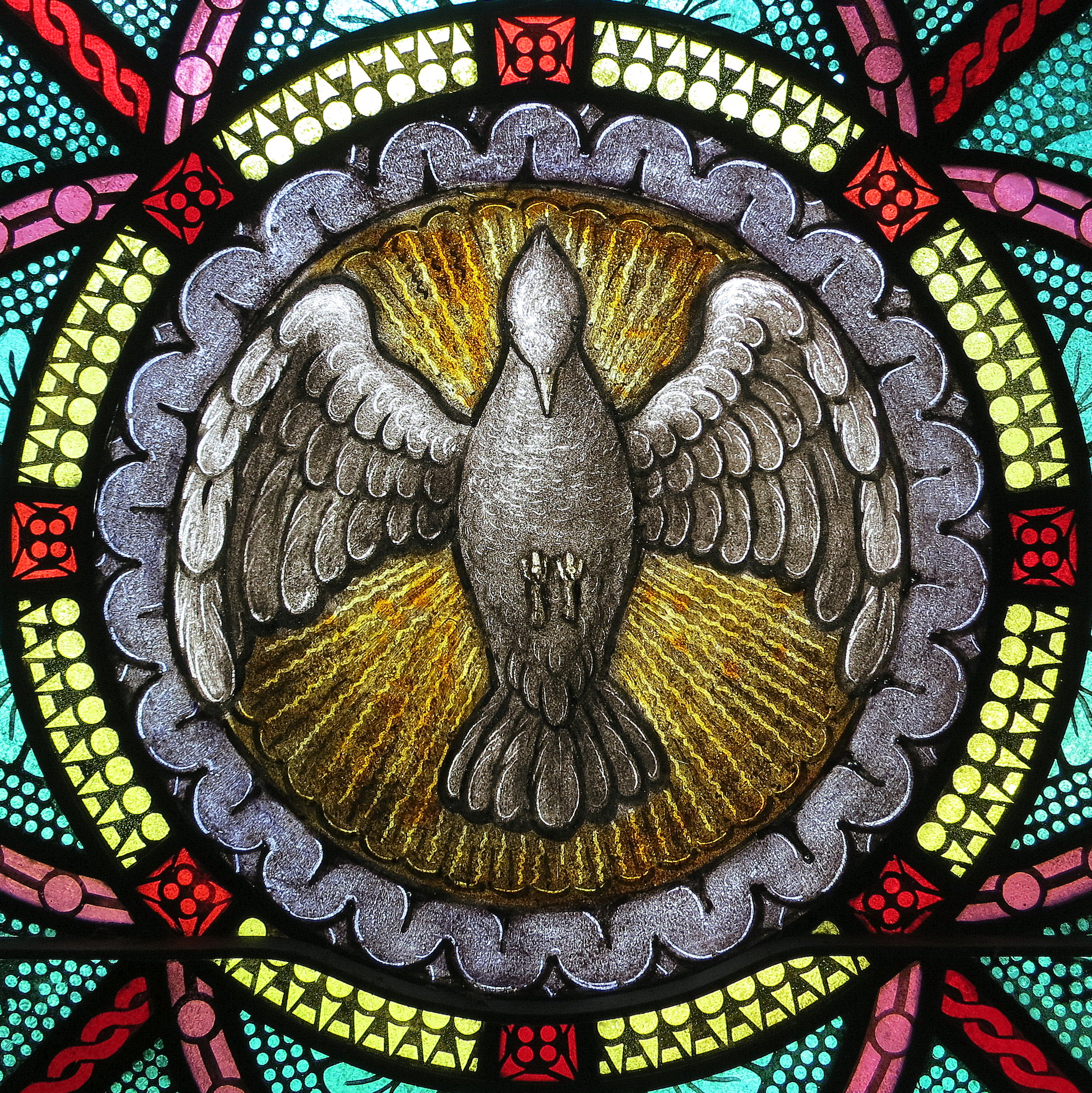
The Holy Spirit as a dove, All Saints Catholic Church, St. Peters, Missouri

The Holy Spirit plays a key role in the Pauline epistles; and the Apostle Paul's pneumatology is closely connected to his theology and Christology, to the point of being almost inseparable from them.

The First Epistle to the Thessalonians, which was likely the first of Paul's letters, introduces a characterization of the Holy Spirit in 1 Thessalonians 1:6 and 1 Thessalonians 4:8 which is found throughout his epistles. In 1 Thessalonians 1:6 Paul refers to the imitation of Christ (and himself) and states: "And ye became imitators of us, and of the Lord, having received the word in much affliction, with joy of the Holy Spirit", whose source is identified in 1 Thessalonians 4:8 as "God, who giveth his Holy Spirit unto you".

These two themes of receiving the Spirit "like Christ" and God being the source of the Spirit persist in Pauline letters as the characterization of the relationship of Christians with God. For Paul the imitation of Christ involves readiness to be shaped by the Holy Spirit, as in Romans 8:4 and 8:11: "But if the Spirit of him that raised up Jesus from the dead dwelleth in you, he that raised up Christ Jesus from the dead shall give life also to your mortal bodies through his Spirit that dwelleth in you."

The First Epistle to the Thessalonians also refers to the power of the Holy Spirit in 1 Thessalonians 1:5, a theme also found in other Pauline letters.

==== In the Apocrypha ====
The view of the Holy Spirit as responsible for Mary's pregnancy, found in the Synoptic Gospels, is different from that found in the apocryphal Gospel of the Hebrews, adopted as canonical by the 4th century Nazarenes, in which Jesus speaks of the Holy Spirit as his mother and thus as female. Some thought femininity incompatible with the idea that Jesus was conceived by the Holy Spirit; according to the apocryphal Gospel of Philip, for example,

Some say, "Mary conceived by the Holy Spirit." They are in error. They do not know what they are saying. When did a woman ever conceive by a woman?

==== Jesus and the Holy Spirit ====
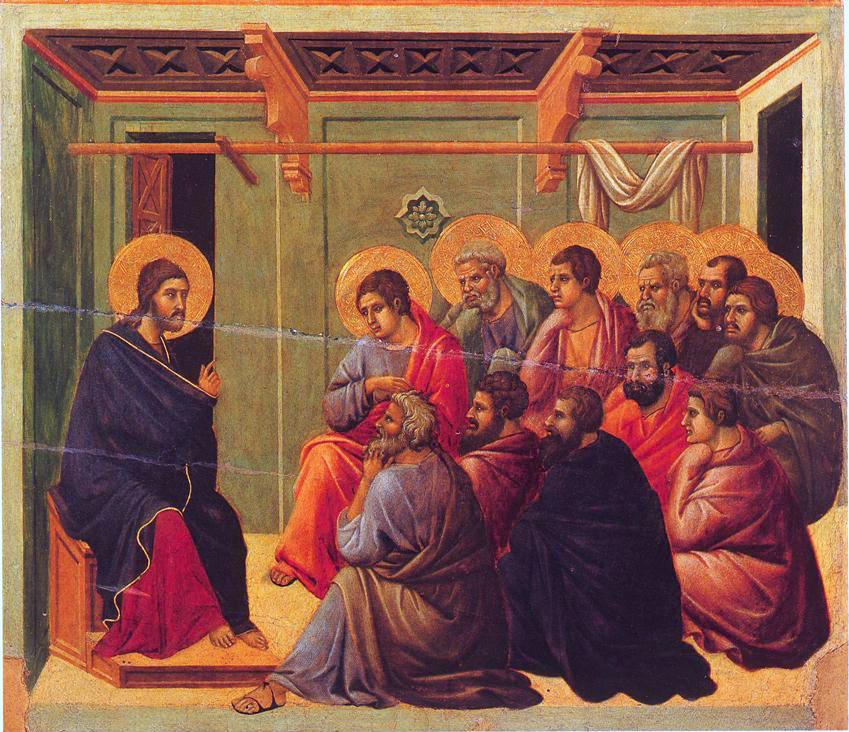
In the Farewell Discourse, Jesus promised to send the Holy Spirit to his disciples after his departure; depiction from the Maesta by Duccio, 1308–1311.

The New Testament details a close relationship between the Holy Spirit and Jesus during his earthly life and ministry. The Apostles' Creed echoes the statements in the Gospels of Luke and Matthew, stating that Jesus was conceived by the Holy Spirit and born of the Virgin Mary.

Specific New Testament references to the interaction of Jesus and the Holy Spirit during his earthly life, and the enabling power of the Holy Spirit during his ministry include:

- "Spirit without measure" having been given to Jesus in John 3:34, referring to the word spoken by Jesus (Rhema) being the words of God.

- Baptism of Jesus, with the Holy Spirit descending on him as a dove in Matthew 3:13–17, Mark 1:9–11 and Luke 3:21–23.
- Temptation of Jesus, in Matthew 4:1 the Holy Spirit led Jesus to the desert to be tempted.
- The Spirit casting out demons in Exorcising the blind and mute man miracle.
- Rejoice the Spirit in Luke 10:21 where seventy disciples are sent out by Jesus.
- Acts 1:2 states that until his death and resurrection, Jesus "had given commandment through the Holy Spirit unto the apostles".
- Referring to the sacrifice of Jesus to be crucified out of obedience to the Father, Hebrews 9:14 states that Jesus "through the eternal Spirit offered himself without blemish unto God".

In his Farewell Discourse to his disciples, Jesus promised that he would "send the Holy Spirit" to them after his departure, in John 15:26 stating: "whom I will send unto you from the Father, [even] the Spirit of truth ... shall bear witness of me".

== Mainstream doctrines ==
Veni Creator Spiritus

The theology of spirits is called pneumatology. The Holy Spirit is referred to as the Lord and Giver of Life in the Nicene Creed. He is the Creator Spirit, present before the creation of the universe and through his power everything was made in Jesus Christ, by God the Father. Christian hymns such as "Veni Creator Spiritus" ("Come, Creator Spirit") reflect this belief.

In early Christianity, the concept of salvation was closely related to the invocation of the "Father, Son and Holy Spirit", and since the first century, Christians have called upon God with the name "Father, Son and Holy Spirit" in prayer, baptism, communion, exorcism, hymn-singing, preaching, confession, absolution and benediction. This is reflected in the saying: "Before there was a 'doctrine' of the Trinity, Christian prayer invoked the Holy Trinity".

For the majority of Christian denominations, the Holy Spirit is the third Person of the Holy Trinity – Father, Son, and Holy Spirit, and is Almighty God. As such he is personal and also fully God, co-equal and co-eternal with God the Father and the Son of God. He is different from the Father and the Son in that he proceeds from the Father (and, according to Roman Catholics, Old Catholics, Lutherans, Anglicans, and other Protestants, from the Father and the Son) as described in the Nicene Creed. The Triune God is thus manifested as three Persons (Greek hypostases), in One Divine Being (Greek: Ousia), called the Godhead (from Old English: Godhood), the Divine Essence of God.

In the New Testament, by the power of the Holy Spirit Jesus was conceived in the womb of the Virgin Mary, while maintaining her virginity. The Holy Spirit descended over Jesus in a corporeal way, as a dove, at the time of his baptism, and a voice from Heaven was heard: "This is my beloved Son with whom I am well pleased." He is the Sanctifier, the Helper, Comforter, the Giver of graces, he who leads persons to the Father and the Son.

The Holy Spirit is credited with inspiring believers and allowing for them to interpret all the sacred scripture, and leads prophets both in Old Testament and New Testament. Christians receive the Fruit of the Holy Spirit by means of his mercy and grace.

=== God the Holy Spirit ===
A depiction of the Trinity consisting of God the Holy Spirit along with God the Father and God the Son (Jesus)

The Christian doctrine of the Trinity includes the concept of God the Holy Spirit, along with God the Son and God the Father. Theologian Vladimir Lossky has argued that while, in the act of the Incarnation, God the Son became manifest as the Son of God, the same did not take place for God the Holy Spirit which remained unrevealed. Yet, as in 1 Corinthians 6:19, God the Spirit continues to dwell in the faithful.

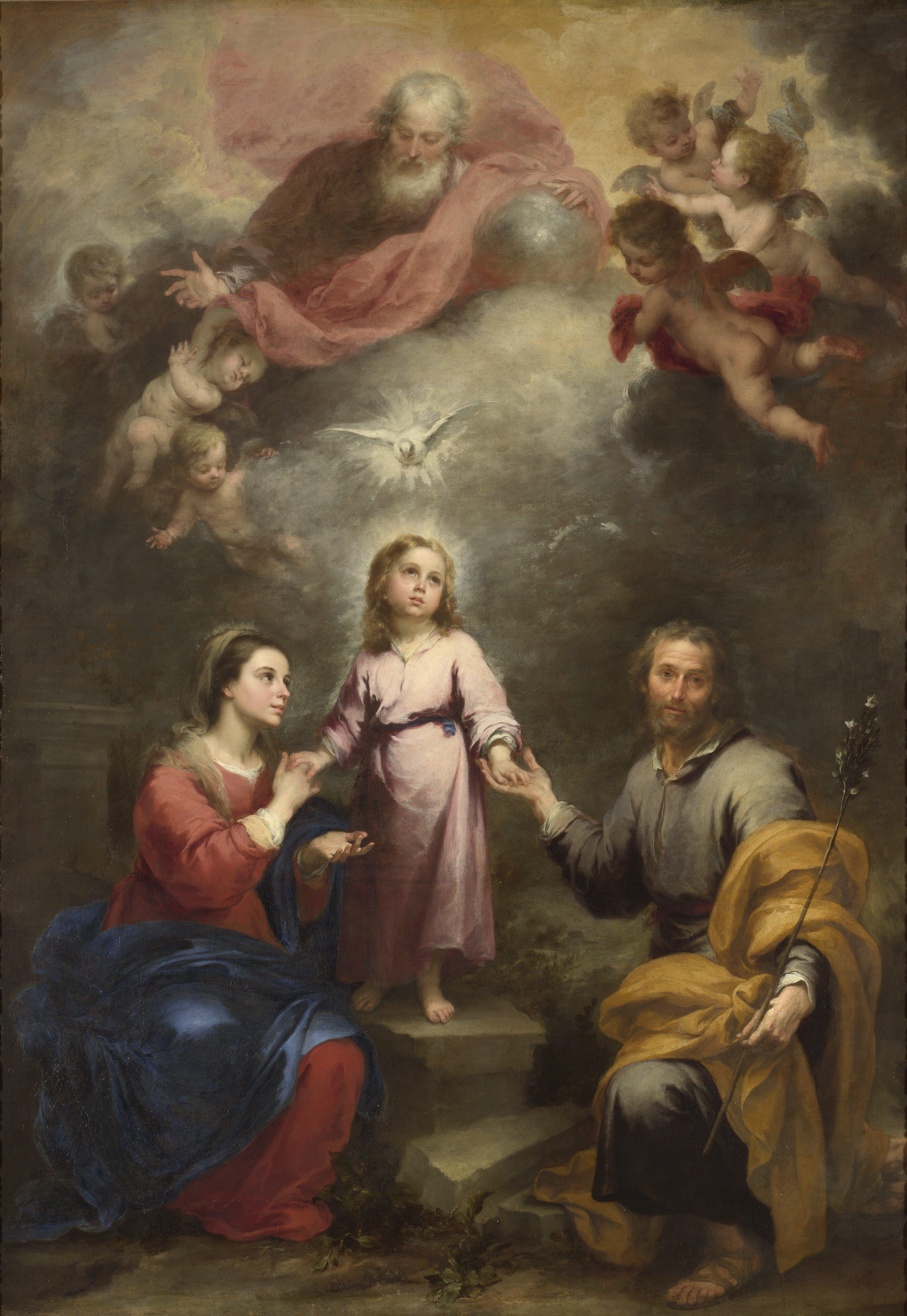
The Holy Spirit as a dove in the Heavenly Trinity, joined to the Holy Family through the Incarnation of the Son, in The Heavenly and Earthly Trinities by Murillo, c. 1677

In a similar way, the Latin treatise De Trinitate (On the Trinity) of Augustine of Hippo affirms: "For as the Father is God, and the Son is God, and the Holy Spirit is God, which no one doubts to be said in respect to substance, yet we do not say that the very Supreme Trinity itself is three Gods, but one God. ...But position, and condition, and places, and times, are not said to be in God properly, but metaphorically and through similitudes. ...And as respects action (or making), perhaps it may be said most truly of God alone, for God alone makes and Himself is not made. Nor is He liable to passions as far as belongs to that substance whereby He is God. ...So the Father is omnipotent, the Son omnipotent, and the Holy Spirit is omnipotent; yet not three omnipotents, but one omnipotent. ...Whatever, therefore, is spoken of God in respect to Himself, is both spoken singly of each Person, that is, of the Father, and the Son, and the Holy Spirit; and together of the Trinity itself, not plurally but in the singular."

In Christian theology, the Holy Spirit is believed to perform specific divine functions in the life of the Christian or the church. The action of the Holy Spirit is seen as an essential part of bringing the person to the Christian faith. The new believer is "born again of the Spirit". The Holy Spirit enables Christian life by dwelling in the individual believers and enables them to live a righteous and faithful life. The Holy Spirit also acts as comforter or Paraclete, one who intercedes, or supports or acts as an advocate, particularly in times of trial. And he acts to convince the unredeemed person both of the sinfulness of their actions and of their moral standing as sinners before God. Another faculty of the Holy Spirit is the inspiration and interpretation of scripture. The Holy Spirit both inspires the writing of the scriptures and interprets them to the Christian and the church.

=== Procession of the Holy Spirit ===
In John 15:26, Jesus says of the Holy Spirit: "But when the Helper comes, whom I will send to you from the Father, the Spirit of truth, who proceeds from the Father, he will bear witness about me." In 325, the First Council of Nicaea, being the first ecumenical council, ended its Creed with the words "and in the Holy Spirit". In 381, the First Council of Constantinople, being the second ecumenical council, expanded the Creed and stated that the Holy Spirit "proceeds from the Father" (ἐκ τοῦ Πατρὸς ἐκπορευόμενον). This phrase was based on John 15:26 (ὃ παρὰ τοῦ πατρὸς ἐκπορεύεται). In 451, the Council of Chalcedon, being the fourth ecumenical council, affirmed the Nicene-Constantinopolitan Creed. During the same time, the question of procession of the Holy Spirit was addressed by various Christian theologians, expressing diverse views and using different terminology, thus initiating the debate that became focused on the Filioque clause.

In 589, the Third Council of Toledo in its third canon officially accepted the doctrine of the procession of the Holy Spirit from the Father and the Son (a Patre et Filio procedere). During the next few centuries, two distinctive schools of thought were gradually shaped: Eastern and Western. Eastern theologians taught that the Holy Spirit proceeds from the Father only (notion referred to as monoprocessionism), while Western theologians taught that the Holy Spirit proceeds from the Father and the Son (notion referred as filioquism). In Mystagogy of the Holy Spirit, Photios I of Constantinople sets out the Eastern position. Debates and controversies between the two sides became a significant point of difference within Christian pneumatology, including their historical role in setting the stage for the Great Schism of 1054.

=== Fruit and Gifts of the Spirit ===
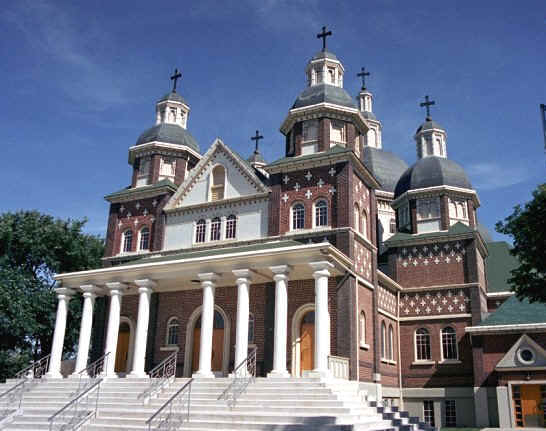
St. Josaphat Cathedral in Edmonton, Alberta, Canada, is shaped as a cross with seven copper domes representing the Seven Gifts of the Holy Spirit.

The fruit of the Holy Spirit consists of "permanent dispositions" (in this similar to the permanent character of the sacraments), virtuous characteristics engendered in the Christian by the action of the Holy Spirit. Galatians 5:22–23 names nine aspects and states:

But the fruit of the Spirit is love, joy, peace, long-suffering, kindness, goodness, faithfulness, meekness, self-control; against such there is no law.

In the Epistle to the Galatians, these nine characteristics are in contrast to the "works of the flesh" and highlight the positive manifestations of the work of the Holy Spirit in believers.

The "gifts of the Holy Spirit" are distinct from the Fruit of the Spirit, and consist of specific abilities granted to the individual Christian. They are frequently known by the Greek word for gift, charisma, in English charism, from which the term charismatic derives. There is no generally agreed upon exhaustive list of the gifts, and various Christian denominations use different lists, often drawing upon 1 Corinthians, Romans 12 and Ephesians 4. Pentecostal denominations and the charismatic movement teach that the absence of the supernatural gifts was due to the neglect of the Holy Spirit and his work by the major denominations. Believers in the relevance of the supernatural gifts sometimes speak of a Baptism with the Holy Spirit or Filling with the Holy Spirit which the Christian needs to experience in order to receive those gifts. However, many Christian denominations hold that the Baptism with the Holy Spirit is identical with conversion, and that all Christians are by definition baptized in the Holy Spirit.

The "seven gifts of the Holy Spirit" are poured out on a believer at baptism, and are traditionally derived from Isaiah 11:1–2, although the New Testament does not refer to Isaiah 11:1–2 regarding these gifts. These 7 gifts are: wisdom, understanding, counsel, fortitude (strength), knowledge, piety and fear of the Lord. This is the view of the Catholic Church and many other mainstream Christian groups.

== Denominational variations ==
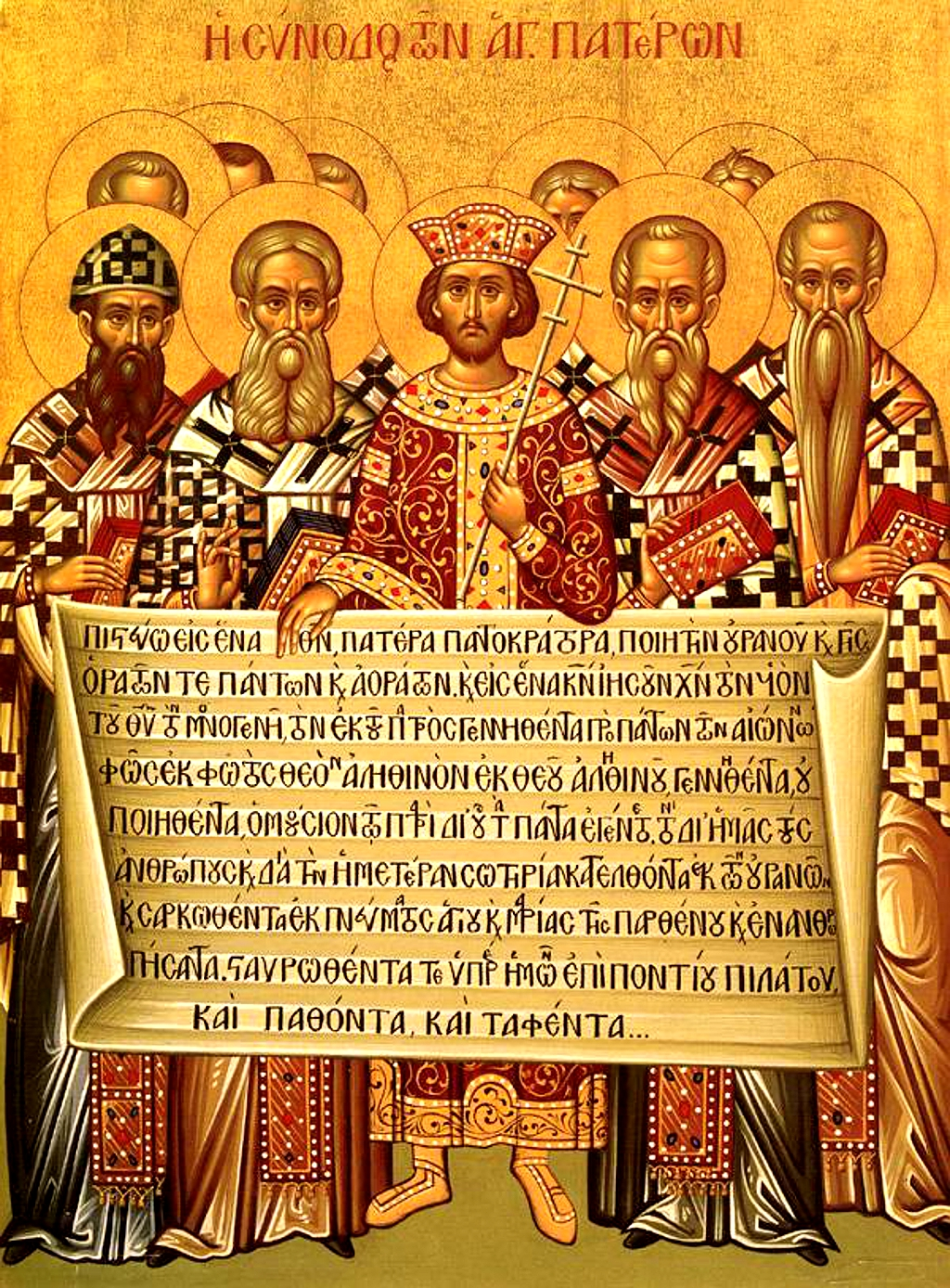
Icon of the Fathers of the Council holding the Nicene Creed

Christian denominations have doctrinal variations in their beliefs regarding the Holy Spirit. A well-known example is the Filioque controversy regarding the Holy Spirit – one of the key differences between the teachings of the main Western Churches and various Eastern Christian denominations (Eastern Orthodox, Oriental Orthodox, Church of the East).

The Filioque debate centres around whether the Nicene Creed should state that the Spirit "proceeds from the Father" and then have a stop, as the creed was initially adopted in Greek (and followed thereafter by the Eastern Church), or should say "from the Father and the Son" as was later adopted in Latin and followed by the Western Church, filioque being "and from the Son" in Latin.

Towards the end of the 20th century, discussions took place about the removal of Filioque in the Nicene Creed from Anglican prayer books along the lines of the Eastern Orthodox and Oriental Orthodox approach, but these still have not reached a state of final implementation.

The majority of mainstream Protestantism hold similar views on the theology of the Holy Spirit as the Roman Catholic Church, but there are significant differences in belief between Pentecostalism and the rest of Protestantism. Pentecostalism has a focus on "Baptism with the Spirit", relying on Acts 1:5 which refers to "now you will baptize with the Holy Spirit". The more recent Charismatic movements have a focus on the "gifts of the Spirit" (such as healing, prophecy, etc.) and rely on 1 Corinthians 12 as a scriptural basis, but often differ from Pentecostal movements.

Non-trinitarian views about the Holy Spirit differ significantly from mainstream Christian doctrine.

=== Catholicism ===
The Holy Spirit has been a topic in at least two papal encyclicals:

- Divinum illud munus – Pope Leo XIII (1897)
- Dominum et vivificantem – Pope John Paul II (1986)

The topic of the Holy Spirit is discussed extensively in the Catechism of the Catholic Church as "I believe in the Holy Spirit" in paragraphs 683 through 747.

=== Lutheranism ===
The theologian Mark Ellingsen noted that "Lutherans have a strong doctrine of the Holy Spirit, giving the Spirit credit for working all things pertinent to salvation and following Jesus (Small Catechism, II.6)." The Apology of the Augsburg Confession teaches:

…having been justified by faith, we have received the Holy Spirit and “spiritual impulses in our hearts” so that “we begin to fear and love God, to pray for and expect help from him, to thank and praise him, and to obey him in our afflictions. We also begin to love our neighbour because our hearts have spiritual and holy impulses” (IV, 125).

The Augsburg Confession teaches that “Because the Holy Spirit is given through faith, the heart is also moved to do good works” (XX, 31). In On the Councils and the Church (1539), Martin Luther emphasized that it was important for Evangelical Lutheran priests to proclaim both Christ’s redemption and the Holy Spirit’s work of sanctification; he wrote that “Christ did not earn only gratia, ‘grace,’ for us, but also donum, ‘the gift of the Holy Spirit,’ so that we might have not only forgiveness of, but also cessation of, sin.” The Evangelical Lutheran tradition holds that the Holy Spirit "unites us to Christ in his death and resurrection through a life of repentance, in his fight against the evil one through the Word and prayer, and in his sacrificial service to others through various gifts." The Evangelical Lutheran theologian Leopoldo Sánchez writes about the Holy Spirit's role in sanctification, as discussed in the Formula of Concord:

The Formula speaks about the believer’s “cooperation” with God in sanctification. After conversion, “the reborn human will is not idle in the daily exercise of repentance, but cooperates in all the works of the Holy Spirit which he performs in us” (Epitome, II, 17; cf. SD, II, 88). The regenerated human will becomes “an instrument and tool of God the Holy Spirit, in that the human will not only accepts grace but also cooperates with the Holy Spirit in the works that proceed from it” (Epitome, II, 18). Such cooperation must be understood in the sense that “the converted do good to the extent that God rules, leads, and guides them with his Holy Spirit,” but not as if the Spirit and the converted are equal partners “in the way two horses draw a wagon together” (SD, II, 66).

The Lutheran sacrament of confession and absolution is grounded in the biblical passage of John 20, in which Jesus bestows the Holy Spirit upon the Apostles to remit and retain sins; bishops exercise “the power of the keys … to preach the gospel, to forgive and retain sin, and to administer and distribute the sacraments” (XXVIII, 5–6).

=== Jehovah's Witnesses and Christadelphians ===
Jehovah's Witnesses and Christadelphians view the Holy Spirit not as an actual person separate from God the Father, but as God's eternal "energy" or "active force" that he uses to accomplish his will in creation and redemption.

=== The Church of Jesus Christ of Latter-day Saints ===
Members of the Church of Jesus Christ of Latter-day Saints (LDS Church) believe that the Holy Ghost is the third member of the Godhead, and is a personage of spirit, without a body of flesh and bones. Unlike in many other denominations, the term "Holy Ghost" remains much more common than "Holy Spirit" in LDS contexts. Nevertheless, the Holy Ghost is sometimes referred to as the Spirit, the Holy Spirit, the Spirit of God, the Spirit of the Lord, or the Comforter. Latter-day Saints believe in a kind of social trinitarianism and subordinationism, meaning that the Father, the Son, and the Holy Ghost are understood as being unified in will and purpose, but not in substance. The Holy Ghost is believed to be subordinate to the Father and the Son and operates under their direction. The Holy Ghost, like all intelligent beings, is believed to be fundamentally eternal, uncreated, and self-existent.

The LDS Church teaches that the influence of the Holy Ghost can be received before baptism, but the gift, or constant companionship, of the Holy Ghost – which comes by the laying-on of hands by a properly ordained priesthood holder with a line of authority traced back to Christ through Peter – is obtained only after baptism when a person is confirmed. Joseph Smith, the founder of the church, taught, "You might as well baptize a bag of sand as a man," he said, "if not done in view of the remission of sins and getting of the Holy Ghost. Baptism by water is but half a baptism, and is good for nothing without the other half – that is, the baptism of the Holy Ghost".

== Symbolism and art ==
=== Symbolism ===
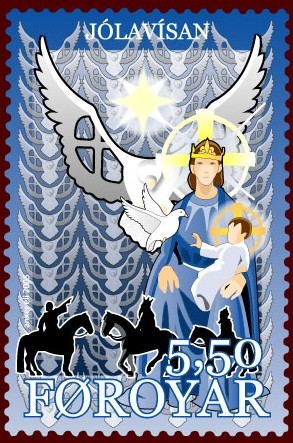
The Holy Spirit as a dove on a stamp from the Faroe Islands

The Holy Spirit is frequently referred to by metaphor and symbol, both doctrinally and biblically. Theologically speaking, these symbols are a key to understanding the Holy Spirit and his actions, and are not mere artistic representations.

- Water – signifies the Holy Spirit's action in Baptism, such that in the manner that "by one Spirit [believers] were all baptized", so they are "made to drink of one Spirit". Thus the Spirit is also personally the living water welling up from Christ crucified as its source and welling up in Christians to eternal life. The Catechism of the Catholic Church, item 1137, considers the Water of Life reference in the Book of Revelation "one of most beautiful symbols of the Holy Spirit".
- Anointing – The symbolism of blessing with oil also signifies the Holy Spirit, to the point of becoming a synonym for the Holy Spirit. The coming of the Spirit is referred to as his "anointing". In some denominations, anointing is practised in Confirmation ("chrismation" in the Eastern Churches). Its full force can be grasped only in relation to the primary anointing accomplished by the Holy Spirit, that of Jesus. The title "Christ" (in Hebrew, messiah) means the one "anointed" by God's Spirit.
- Fire – symbolizes the transforming energy of the Holy Spirit's actions. In the form of tongues "as of fire", the Holy Spirit rested on the disciples on the morning of Pentecost.
- Cloud and light – The Spirit comes upon the Virgin Mary and "overshadows" her, so that she might conceive and give birth to Jesus. On the mountain of transfiguration, the Spirit in the "cloud came and overshadowed" Jesus, Moses and Elijah, Peter, James and John, and "a voice came out of the cloud, saying, 'This is my Son, my Chosen; listen to him!'"
- The dove – When Christ comes up from the water of his baptism, the Holy Spirit, in the form of a dove, comes down upon him and remains with him.
- Wind – The Spirit is likened to the "wind that blows where it will," and described as "a sound from heaven like the rush of a mighty wind."

=== Art, literature and architecture ===
Art

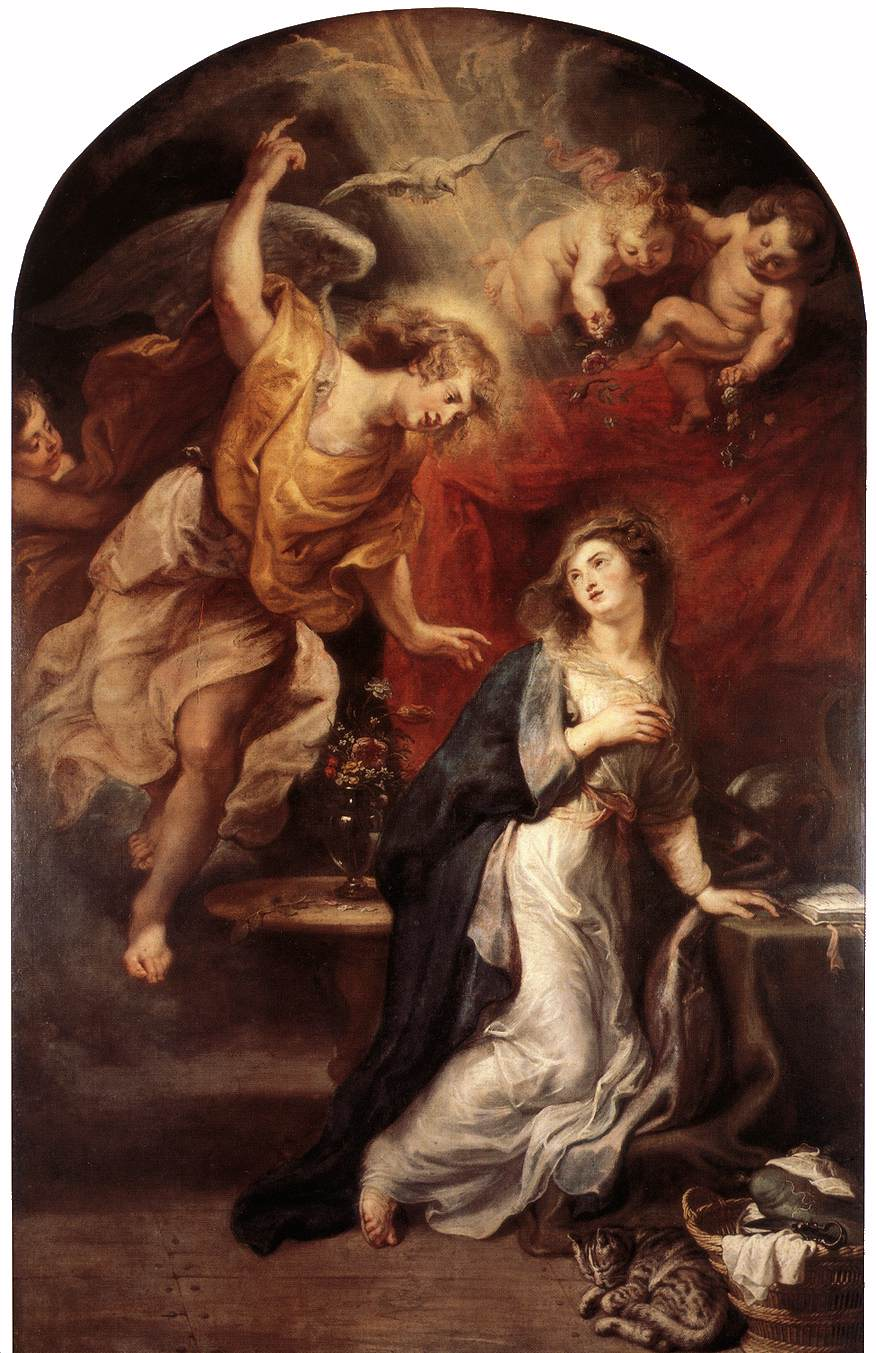
The Holy Spirit as a dove in the Annunciation by Rubens, 1628

The Holy Spirit has been represented in Christian art both in the Eastern and Western Churches using a variety of depictions. The depictions have ranged from nearly identical figures that represent the three persons of the Holy Trinity, to a dove, to a flame.

The Holy Spirit is often depicted as a dove, based on the account of the Holy Spirit descending on Jesus like a dove when he was baptized in the Jordan River. In many paintings of the Annunciation, the Holy Spirit is shown in the form of a dove, coming down towards Mary on beams of light, as the Archangel Gabriel announces Jesus Christ's coming to Mary. A dove may also be seen at the ear of Gregory the Great – as recorded by his secretary – or other church father authors, dictating their works to them. The dove also parallels the one that brought the olive branch to Noah after the deluge, as a symbol of peace.

The book of Acts describes the Holy Spirit descending on the apostles at Pentecost in the form of a wind and tongues of fire resting over the apostles' heads. Based on that account, the Holy Spirit is sometimes symbolized by a flame of fire.

Ancient Celtic Christians depicted the Holy Spirit as a goose called Ah Geadh-Glas, which means wild goose. A goose was chosen rather than the traditional dove because geese were perceived as more free than their dove counterparts.

Literature

The Holy Spirit has traditionally been a subject matter of strictly theological works focused on proving the central doctrines concerning the Holy Spirit, often as a response to arguments from religious groups who deny these beliefs. In recent years, however, the Holy Spirit has made an entrance into the world of (Christian) literature through books such as The Shack published in 2007.

==== Visual arts ====
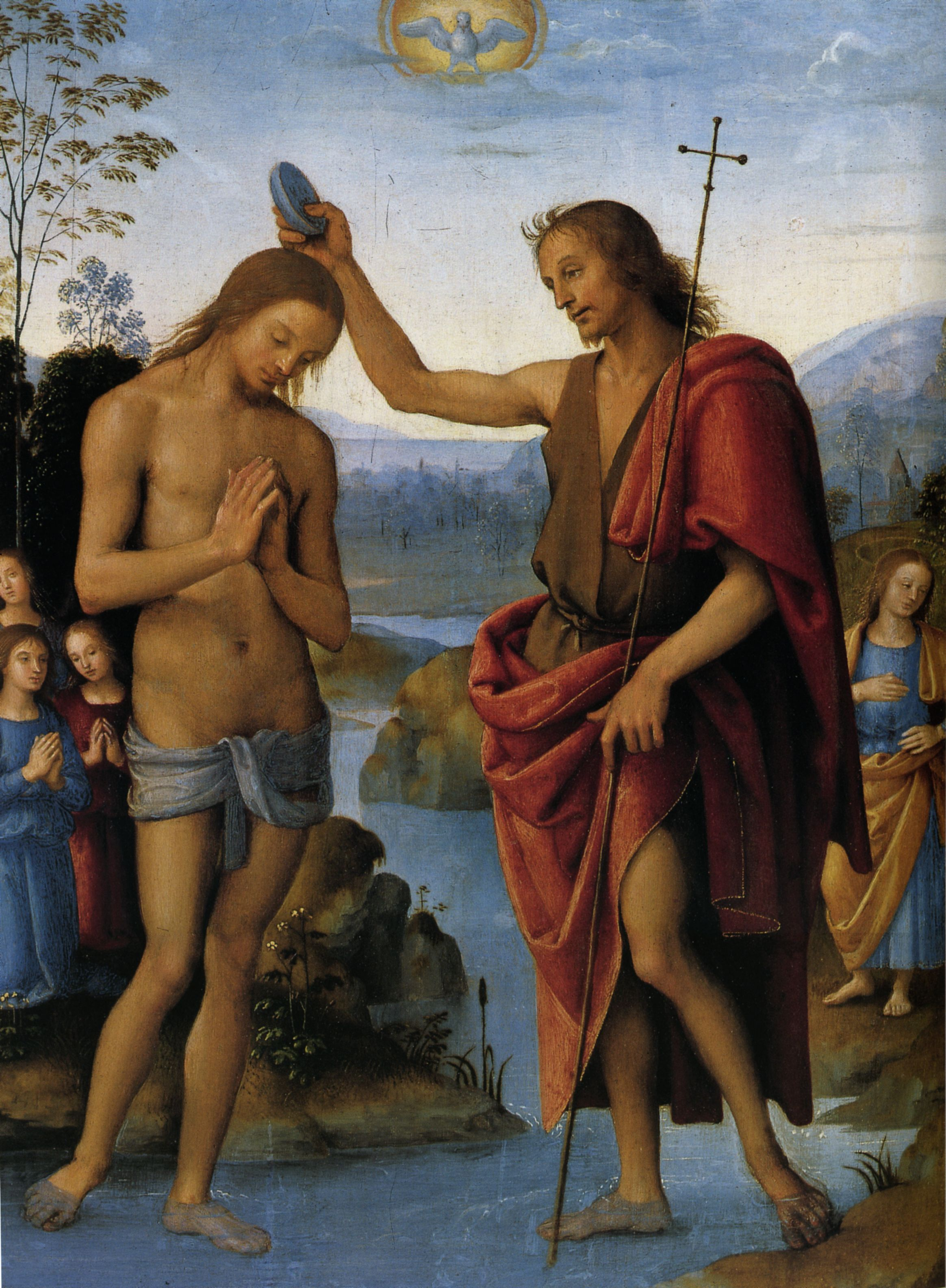
Dove representation in the Baptism of Christ by Pietro Perugino, c. 1498

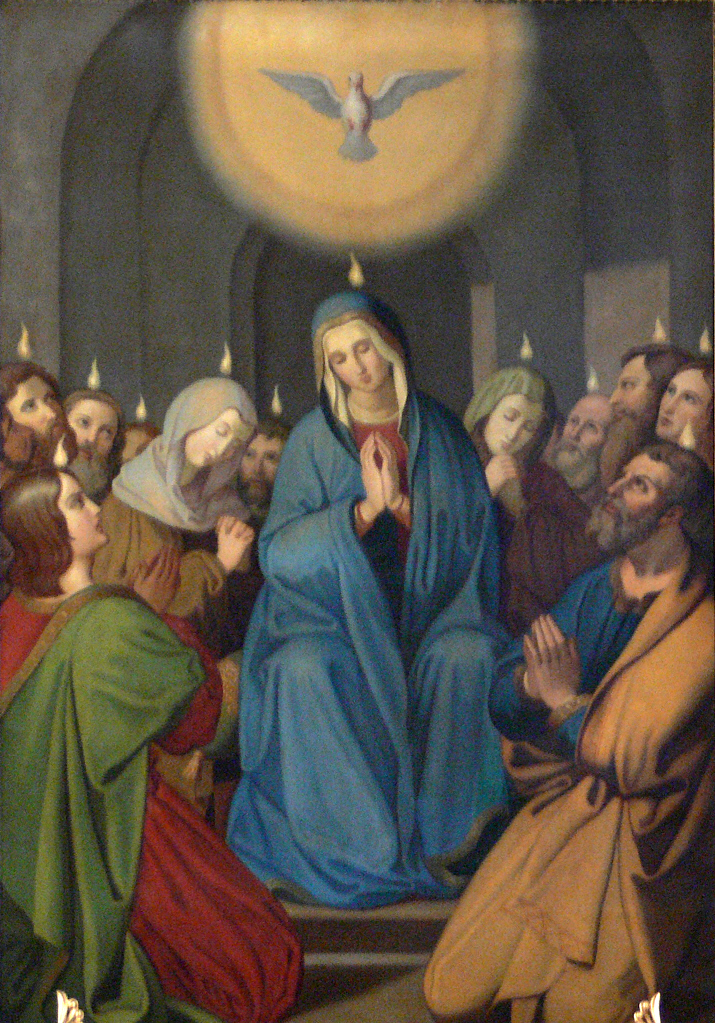
Representation as both dove and flames, Ravensburg, Germany, 1867

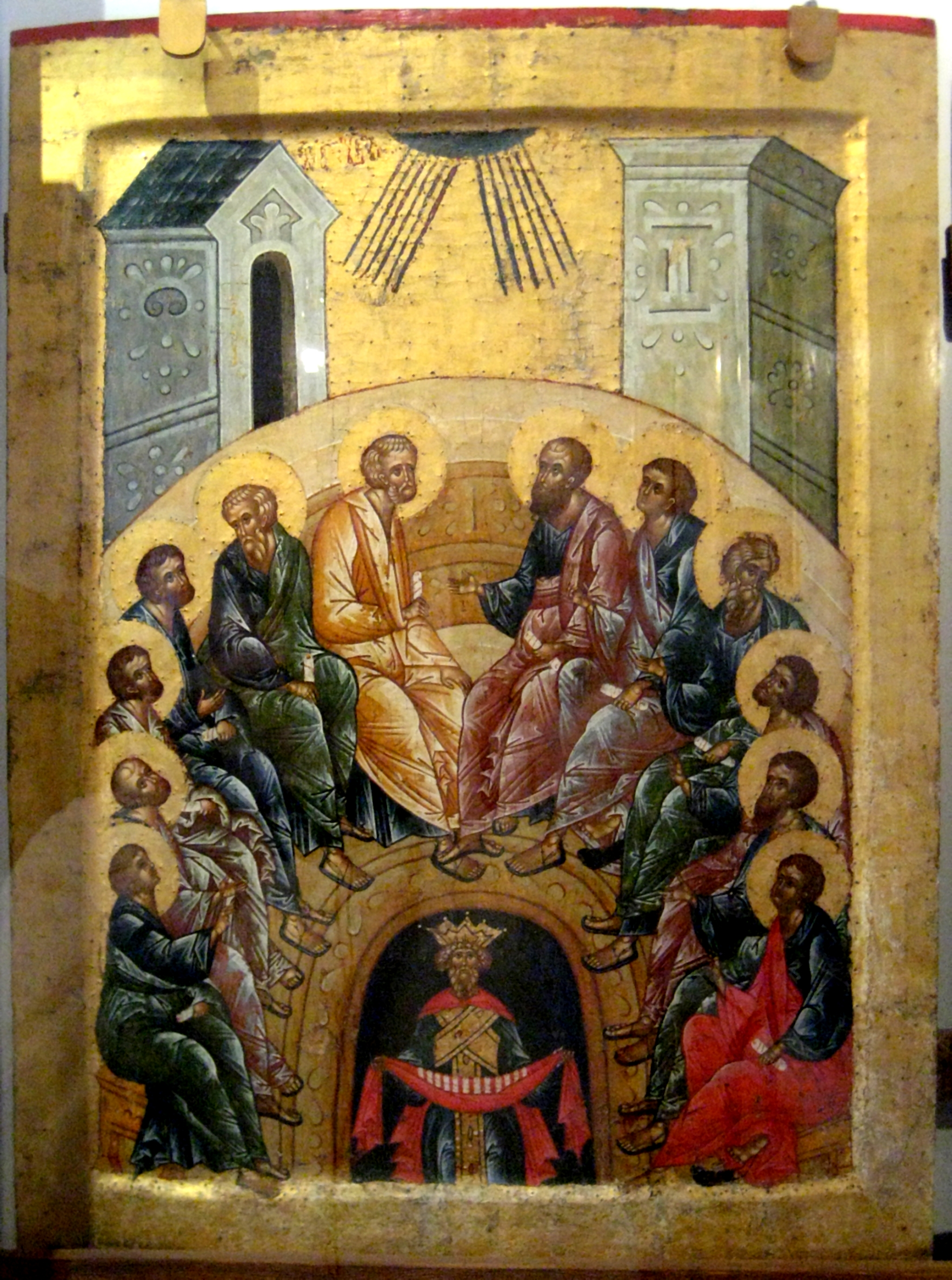
Ray of light representation in Russian icon of the Pentecost, 15th century

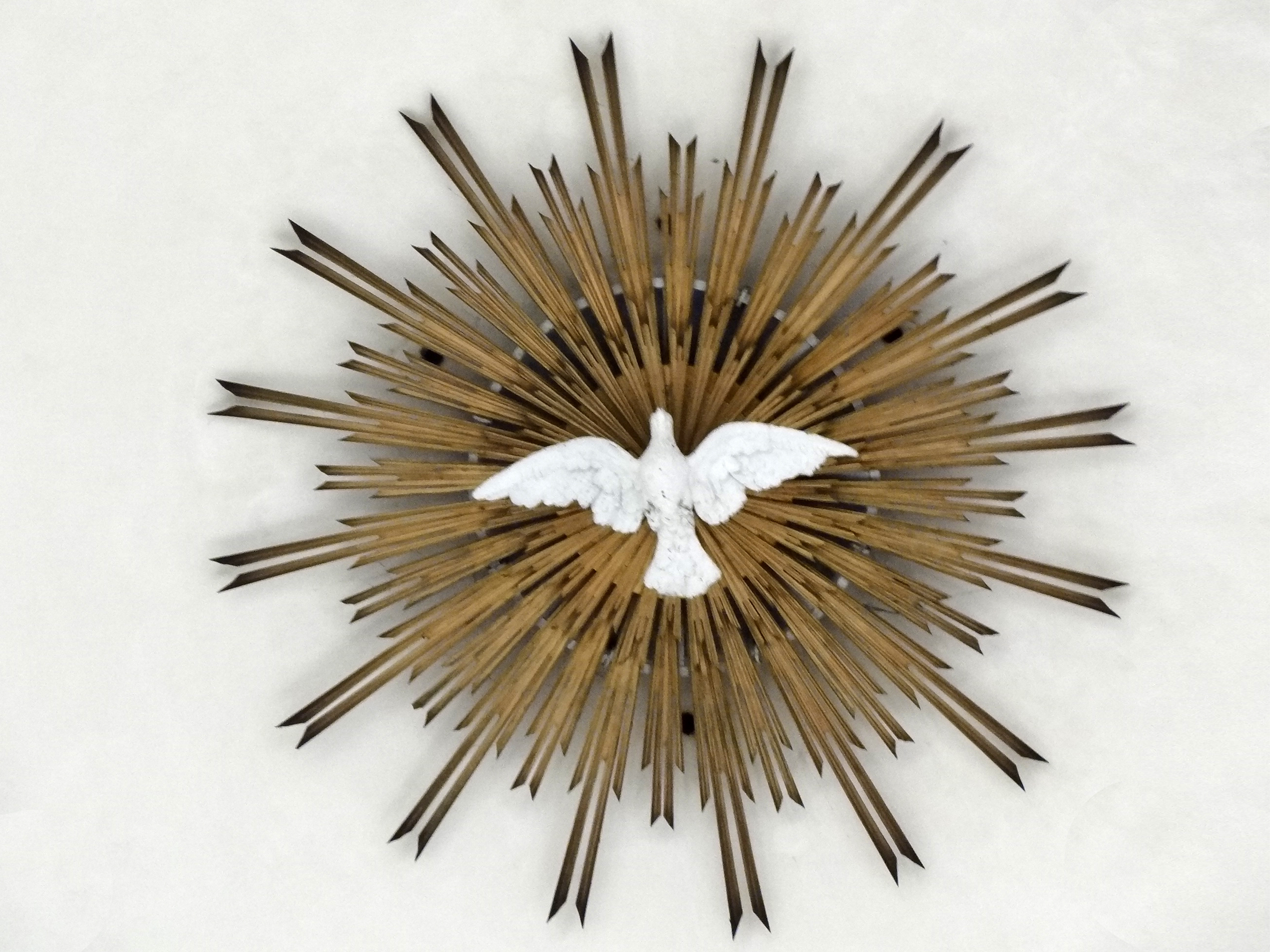
On the keystone (inside of the dome) of the Church of St. Michael the Archangel, Kaunas

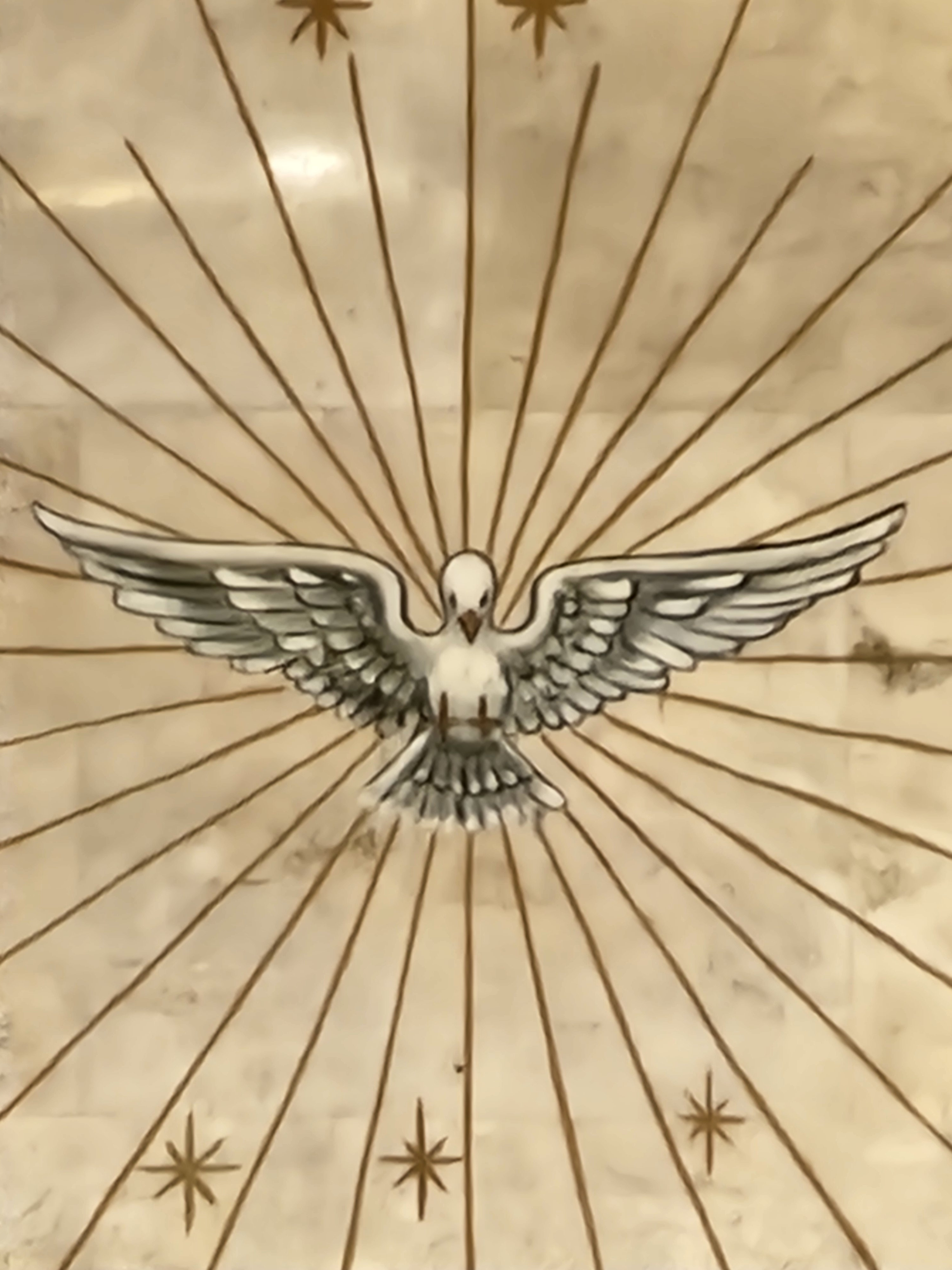
On the canopy (behind the altar) of the Manila Cathedral

==== Holy Spirit cathedrals ====
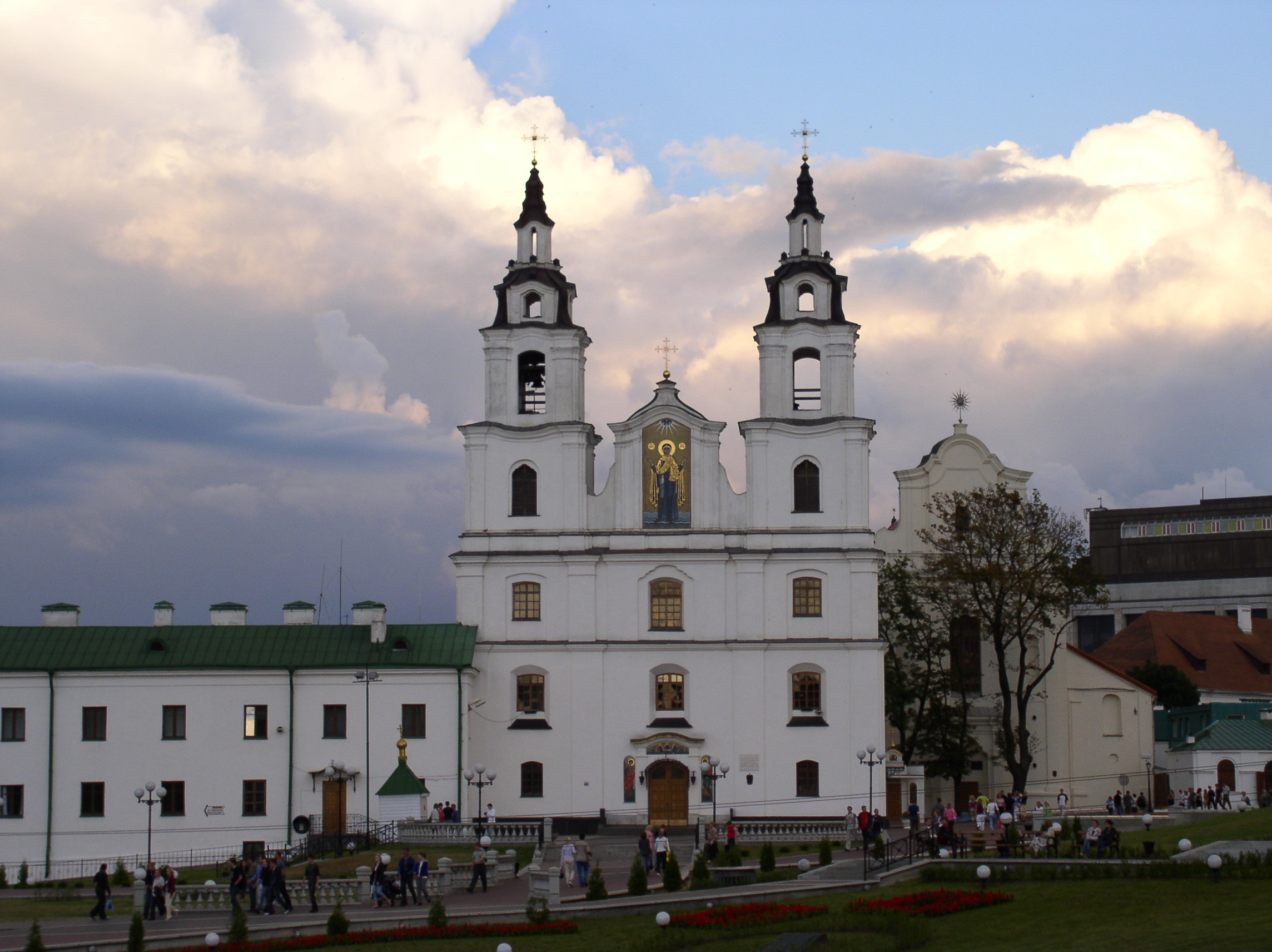
Holy Spirit Cathedral (Minsk), Belarus

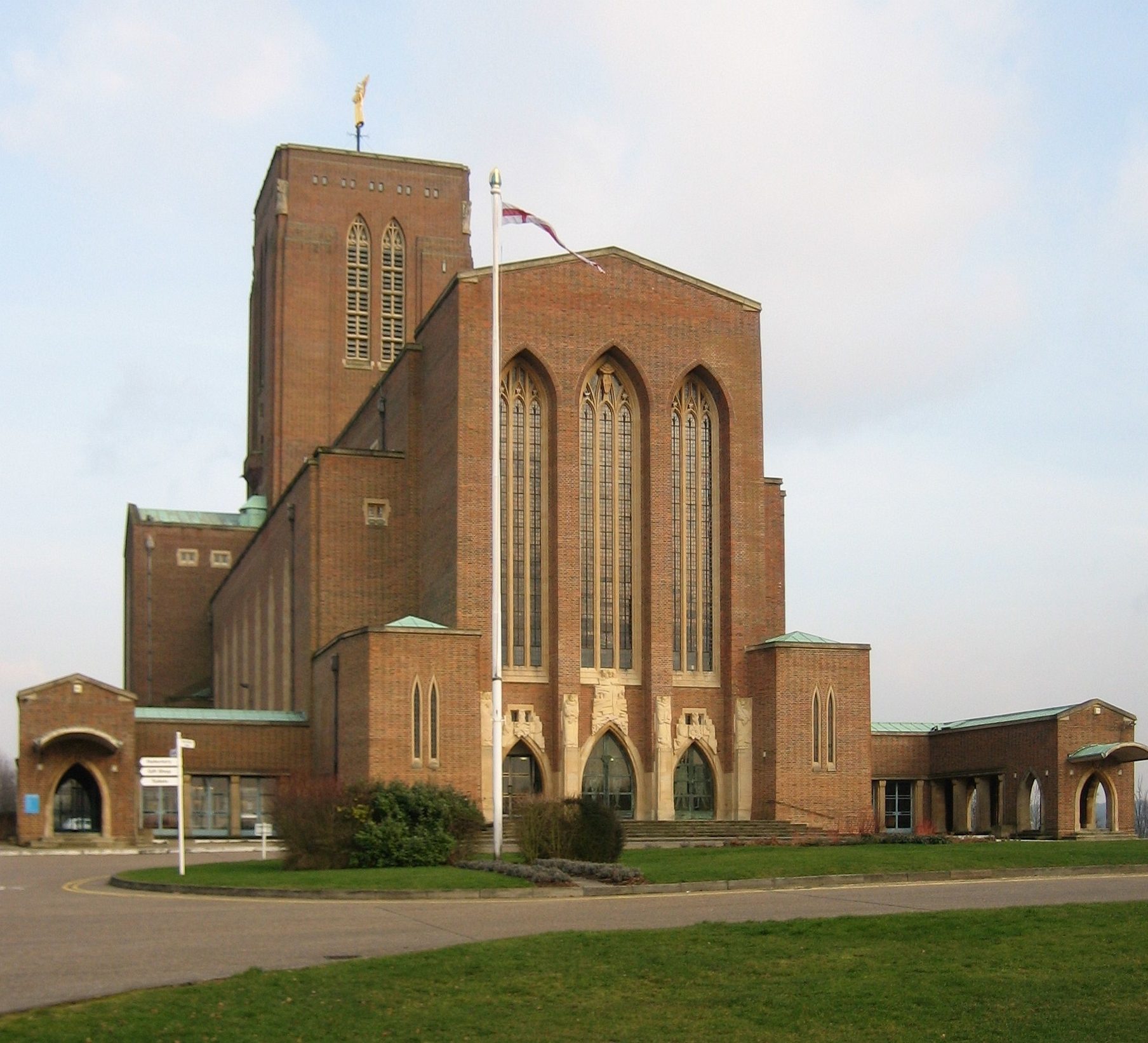
Guildford Cathedral, UK

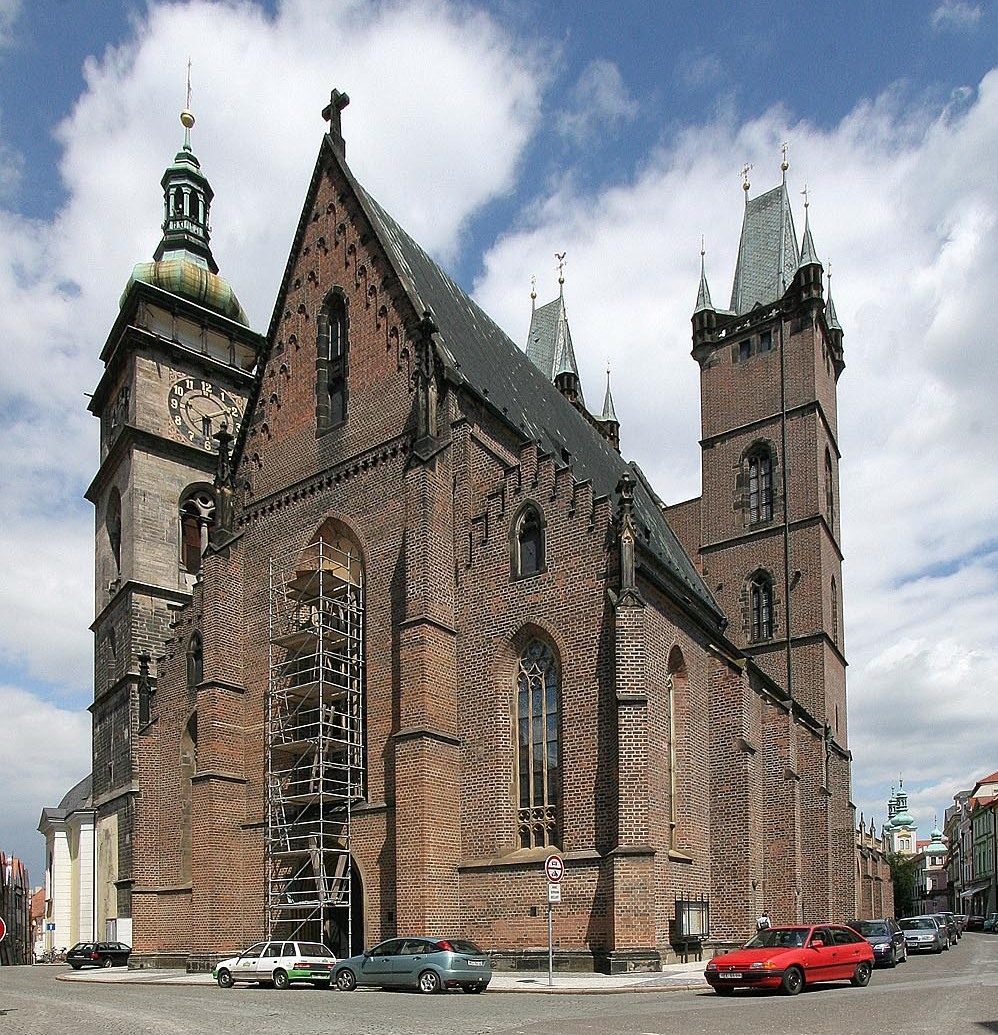
Cathedral in Hradec Králové, Czech Republic

== See also ==
- Veni Sancte Spiritus
- Barbelo
- Cult of the Holy Spirit
- Gender of the Holy Spirit
- Pentecost
- Intercession of the Spirit
- Miracle
- Seven Spirits of God
- Chaplet in Honour of the Holy Spirit

== Sources ==
- Martínez-Díez, Gonzalo; Rodriguez, Felix (1992). Colección canónica hispana (in Spanish). Vol. 5. Madrid, Spain: Consejo Superior de Investigaciones Científicas. ISBN 978-8400072629.
- Meyendorff, John (1989). Imperial unity and Christian divisions: The Church 450–680 A.D. The Church in history. Vol. 2. Crestwood, New York: St. Vladimir's Seminary Press. ISBN 978-0881410563.
- Wilhite, David E. (2009). "The Baptists 'And the Son': The Filioque Clause in Noncreedal Theology". Journal of Ecumenical Studies. 44 (2): 285–302.
- Phillips, Andrew (1995). Orthodox Christianity and the English Tradition. Frithgarth, UK: Anglo-Saxon Books. ISBN 978-1898281009.
