= Galatians 5 =

- ← chapter 4 chapter 6 →
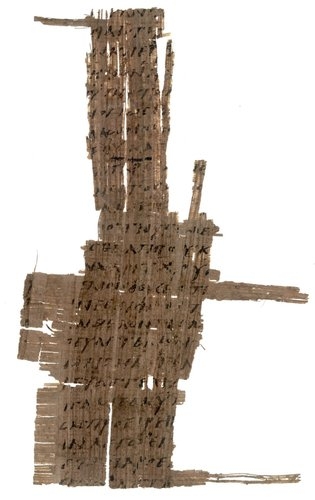
- A page showing Galatians 1:2–10 on Papyrus 51, c. AD 400.
- Book: Epistle to the Galatians
- Category: Pauline epistles
- Christian Bible part: New Testament
- Order in the Christian part: 9

Galatians 5 is the fifth chapter of the Epistle to the Galatians in the New Testament of the Christian Bible. It is authored by Paul the Apostle for the churches in Galatia, written between AD 49–58. This chapter contains a discussion about circumcision and the allegory of the "Fruit of the Holy Spirit".

== Text ==
The original text was written in Koine Greek. This chapter is divided into 26 verses.

=== Old Testament references ===
- Galatians 5:14: Leviticus 19:18

== Verse 1 ==
New King James Version

Stand fast therefore in the liberty by which Christ has made us free, and do not be entangled again with a yoke of bondage.

New Revised Standard Version

For freedom Christ has set us free.
Stand firm, therefore, and do not submit again to a yoke of slavery.

The Greek of the verse's first part is considered awkward, that among many possibilities, it is suggested to be a conclusion of the Hagar-Sarah allegory or a short independent bridging paragraph between the allegory and the new themes in the chapters 5 and 6.

== Neither Circumcision Nor Uncircumcision (5:2–12) ==
These verses bring up the central theme which is mentioned in chapter 2 about the chasm between "being justified by the law" and "living by faith through the Spirit", in this case a theme that is related to circumcision.

== Living by the Spirit (5:13–26) ==
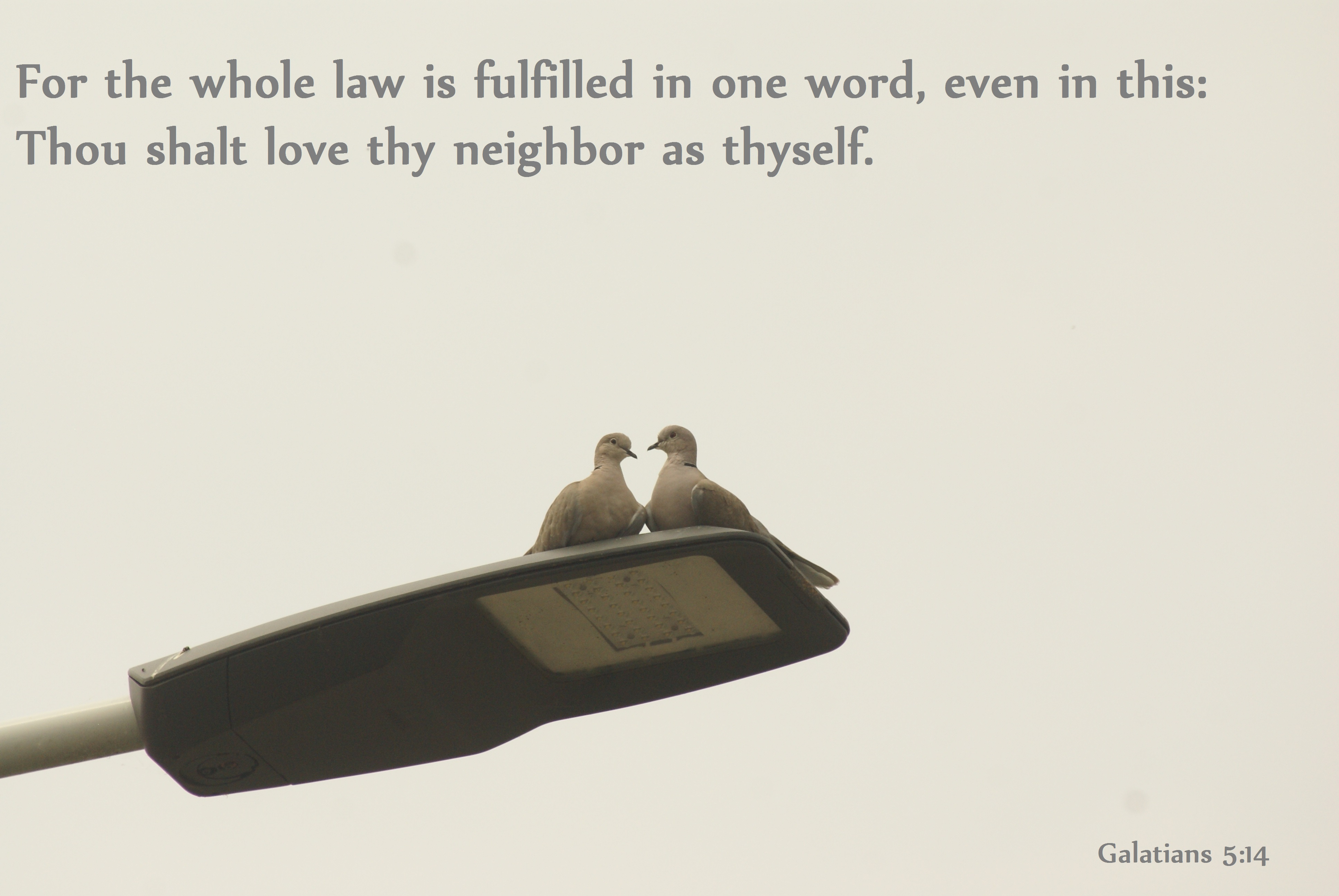
Image with words from Galatians 5:14 (Rob Hille; 2013).

In this section Paul contrasts "living by the Spirit" with "gratifying the desires of the flesh", which are two opposing ways of living.

=== Verse 14 ===
For all the law is fulfilled in one word, even in this: "You shall love your neighbor as yourself."

Using the citation from Leviticus 19:18 Paul speaks positively about the law which is "fulfilled" in the coming of Christ. (Note: Stanton finds the NRSV rendering "the whole law is summed up" is misleading, because the verb means 'fulfil'. Stanton 2007, p. 1163)

=== Works of the Flesh ===
Paul lists the works of the flesh (verses 19–21) as the behaviors that would prevent individuals from inheriting the kingdom of God.

English Standard Version

^{19}Now the works of the flesh are evident: sexual immorality, impurity, sensuality, ^{20}idolatry, sorcery, enmity, strife, jealousy, fits of anger, rivalries, dissensions, divisions, ^{21}envy, drunkenness, orgies, and things like these. I warn you, as I warned you before, that those who do such things will not inherit the kingdom of God.

— Galatians 5:19–21

Good News Translation

^{19}What human nature does is quite plain. It shows itself in immoral, filthy, and indecent actions;^{20}in worship of idols and witchcraft. People become enemies and they fight; they become jealous, angry, and ambitious. They separate into parties and groups; ^{21}they are envious, get drunk, have orgies, and do other things like these. I warn you now as I have before: those who do these things will not possess the Kingdom of God.

— Galatians 5:19–21

The lists or catalogues of vices (and also lists of virtues such the one in Galatians 5:22-23) were a form of ethical instruction very common in the Greco-Roman world.

== Bibliography ==
- Coogan, Michael David (2007). Coogan, Michael David; Brettler, Marc Zvi; Newsom, Carol Ann; Perkins, Pheme (eds.). The New Oxford Annotated Bible with the Apocryphal/Deuterocanonical Books: New Revised Standard Version, Issue 48 (Augmented 3rd ed.). Oxford University Press. ISBN 9780195288810.
- Stanton, G. N. (2007). "67. Galatians". In Barton, John; Muddiman, John (eds.). The Oxford Bible Commentary (first (paperback) ed.). Oxford University Press. pp. 1152–1165. ISBN 978-0199277186.
