= Chaplet in Honour of the Holy Spirit =

Christian devotional prayer

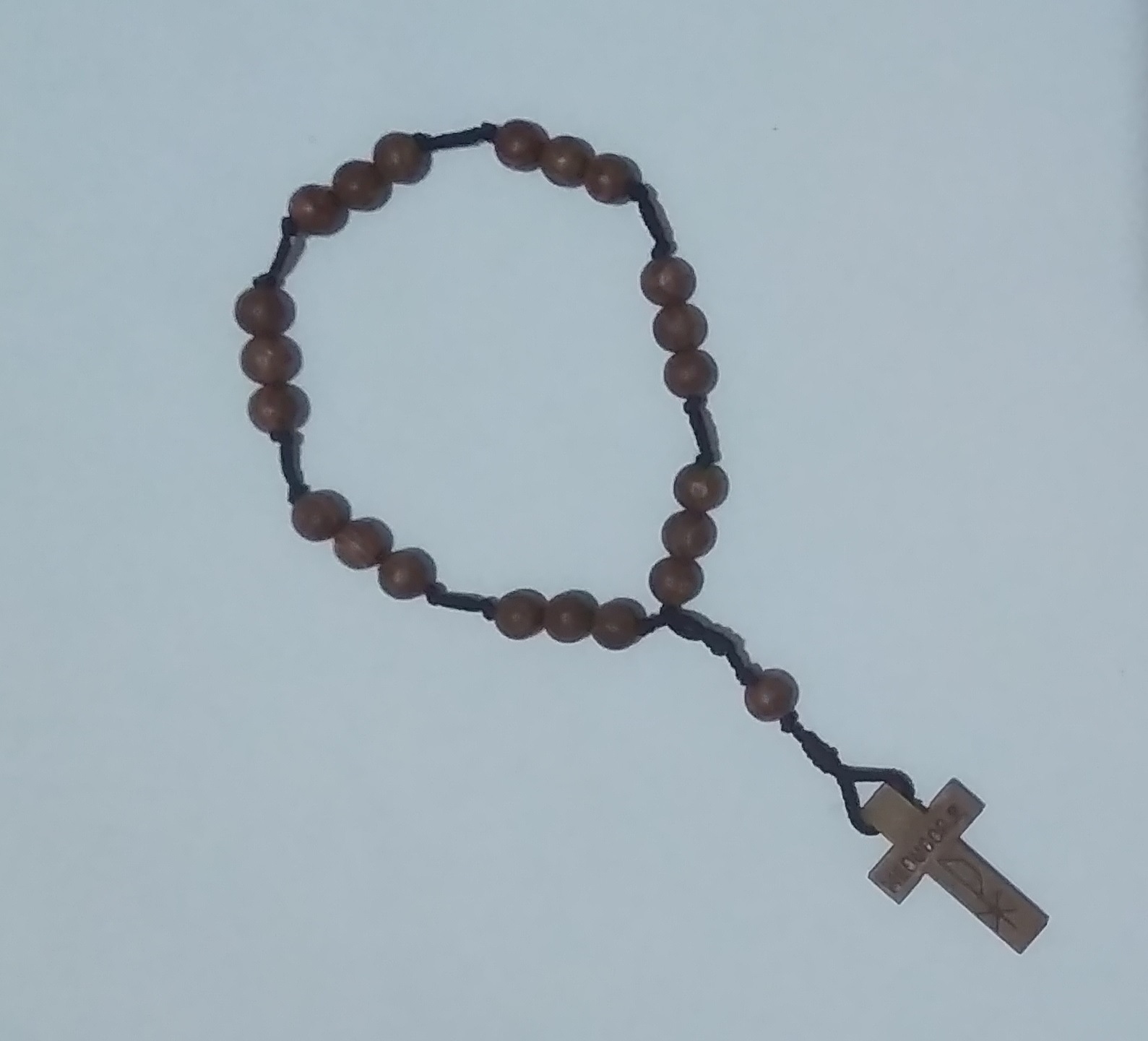
The Peace Rosary, also known as the Peace Chaplet, recommended by the Blessed Virgin Mary in Medjugorje

The Chaplet in Honour of the Holy Spirit, also known as Chaplet of the Holy Spirit and His Seven Gifts, is a modern Christian devotion to the Holy Spirit, asking for seven gifts of the Holy Spirit: wisdom, understanding, counsel, fortitude, knowledge, piety, and fear of the Lord. The devotion was invented in Poland.

== History ==
The devotion was composed in 1994 in Chludowo in Poland by a Polish Verbite priest Mirosław Piątkowski (missionary), who wanted to facilitate in this way his regular prayer to the Holy Spirit, in accordance with the spiritual recommendations of John Henry Newman (1801–1880) and Arnold Janssen (1837–1909), the founder of the Society of the Divine Word (popularly called Verbites or the Divine Word Missionaries). The inspiration for creating the new chaplet was provided by a gift he received from his friend, a Peace Rosary (also known as Peace Chaplet or Workers Rosary) brought from Medjugorje, consisting of 22 beads (1 + 7 x 3) and a cross. The Peace Rosary is allegedly recommended for regular prayer by Our Lady of Medjugorje ("There are many Christians who no longer believe because they are not praying. Therefore, start praying daily, at least seven times, Our Father, Hail Mary, Glory be to the Father, and I believe in God").

In 1998, Fr. Piątkowski published a book about the chaplet, with the consent of the Roman Catholic Diocese of Warszawa-Praga. He justified the devotion with two quotes from the Bible, in the words of Paul the Apostle "the fruit of the Spirit is love, joy, peace, forbearance, kindness, goodness, faithfulness, gentleness and self-control" (Galatians 5:22) and the words of Jesus "how much more shall your heavenly Father give the holy Spirit to them that ask Him?" (Luke 11:13). Fr. Piątkowski wrote in his book: "I believe and I am firmly convinced that every human being wants at least some of these virtues and attitudes for himself or for others. However, since these are the fruits of the Spirit, they are not just our human efforts. We often have to pray to God, to the Holy Spirit, that this reality will become our part".

In Poland, not only religious orders (Verbites, Camillians, Missionary Sisters of Christ the King, etc.), but also lay persons, e.g from the Daisy Movement make use of the Chaplet in Honour of the Holy Spirit.

== Structure ==
The chaplet is begun on the short strand of the beads:

- On the crucifix, the sign of the cross: In the name of the Father and of the Son, and of the Holy Spirit. Amen
- I believe in God, the Father almighty...
- On the first bead, invocation of the Holy Spirit by the Golden Sequence (a hymn prescribed for the Masses of Pentecost and its octave):

Holy Spirit, God of light, fill us with your radiance bright;
Gentle father of the poor, make us, by your help, secure;
Come, your boundless grace impart, bring your love to every heart.
Lord of consolation, come, warm us when our hearts are numb;
Great consoler, come and heal, to our souls your strength reveal;
Cool, refreshing comfort pour, and our peace of mind restore.
Light immortal, fire divine, with your love our hearts refine;
Come, our inmost being fill, make us all to do your will;
Goodness you alone can give, grant that in your grace we live.
Come, our lukewarm hearts inspire, mold our wills to your desire;
In our weakness make us strong, and amend our every wrong;
Guide us when we go astray, wash our stain of guilt away.
Give to every faithful soul, gifts of grace to make us whole;
Help us when we come to die, so that we may live on high;
Ever let your love descend, give us joys that never end.

— Anthony Petti translation of Veni Sancte Spiritus, sung commonly to the Samuel Webbe music.

The praying of the seven groups of three beads each then follows:

1. Be adored, Holy Spirit, and come to us in the gift of Wisdom. Our Father..., Hail Mary..., Glory be to the Father...
2. ...Understanding...
3. ...Counsel...
4. ...Fortitude...
5. ...Knowledge...
6. ...Piety...
7. ...God's Fear...

To conclude:

- Leader: Send your Holy Spirit, Lord, and there shall be life,
- All: and You renew the face of the earth.
- Leader: Let us pray. Lord our God, you filled the hearts of Your faithful with the light of the Holy Spirit: in this Spirit may we come to know all truth and always be granted His comfort and joy. Through Jesus Christ, our Lord. Amen.
- Leader: Immaculate Bride of the Holy Spirit,
- All: pray for us.

== Spiritual outcome ==
Subsequent editions of Rev. Piątkowski's book about the chaplet include testimonies of people who explain how the prayer helped in their spiritual development and everyday life.

This prayer also inspired him to create a "Fruit Novena" to the Holy Spirit, based on the chaplet and a quote from the Epistle to the Galatians: "But the fruit of the Spirit is love, joy, peace, forbearance, kindness, goodness, faithfulness, gentleness and self-control. Against such things there is no law" (Galatians 5:22–23).

Both the chaplet and the novenna formed a basis for creation of a network of environmental pilgrimage routes, Drogi Ducha Świętego (Rogalin Ways of the Holy Spirit) on the occasion of the 200th anniversary of St. Marcellinus Church in Rogalin. The aim of this initiative is to promote walking and cycling pilgrimages, trips (family, school, etc.) and strolling, as well as both prayers to the Holy Spirit (chaplet for the 7 gifts and novena for the 9 fruits of the Holy Spirit), a healthy lifestyle and respect for nature and history, not only around Rogalin, but also in other places.
