= Galatians 6 =

- ← chapter 5 Ephesians 1 →
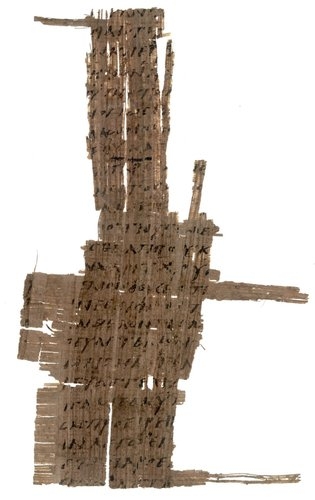
- A page showing Galatians 1:2-10 on Papyrus 51, ca. AD 400.
- Book: Epistle to the Galatians
- Category: Pauline epistles
- Christian Bible part: New Testament
- Order in the Christian part: 9

Galatians 6 is the sixth (and the last) chapter of the Epistle to the Galatians in the New Testament of the Christian Bible. It is authored by Paul the Apostle for the churches in Galatia, written between 49–58 CE. This chapter contains Paul's exhortations and also a summary of the key points in the epistle.

== Text ==
The original text was written in Koine Greek. This chapter is divided into 18 verses.

=== Textual witnesses ===
Some early manuscripts containing the text of this chapter are:

- Papyrus 46 (~AD 200)
- Codex Vaticanus (325-350)
- Codex Sinaiticus (330-360)
- Papyrus 99 (~400; extant verses 1-15)
- Codex Alexandrinus (400-440)
- Codex Ephraemi Rescriptus (~450; complete)
- Codex Claromontanus (~550)

== Work for the Good of All (6:1–10) ==
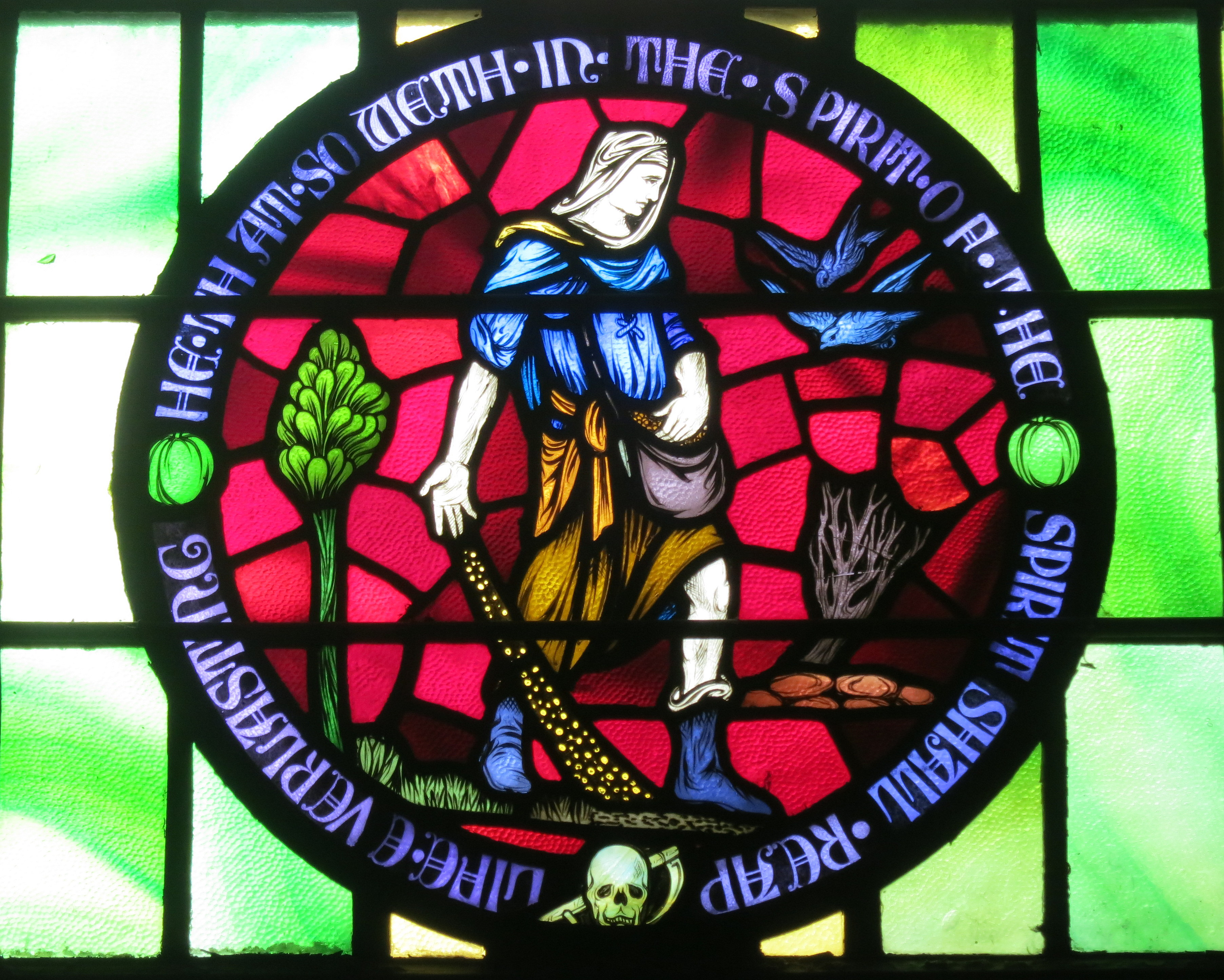
Sower of Galatians 6:8. Saint Aloysius Catholic Church (Bowling Green, Ohio; 2014)

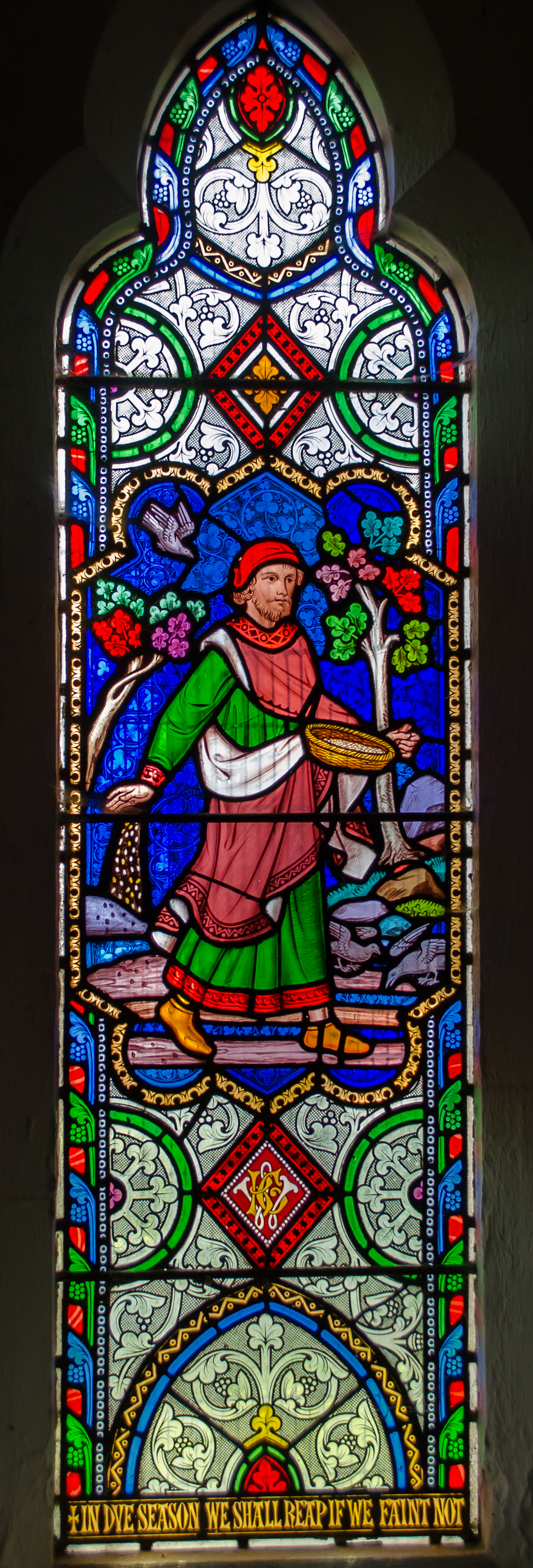
The Sower by W. Wailes, 1864, Galatians 6:9. Stained glass window, St Peter's church, Rodmell, E. Sussex.

This section, in every verse, includes exhortations, which are related to the particular needs of the churches in Galatia.

=== Verse 2 ===
Bear one another’s burdens, and so fulfill the law of Christ.

- "Bear one another's burdens": can be done by gentle reprove, by comforting those stressed with guilt, by sympathizing in others' sorrow, by praying to God to manifest his pardoning grace, by forgiving other people, when they committed faults, or by accommodating their weakness, by administering help and relief, whether temporal or spiritual, and bear a part with them in their griefs.
- "Fulfil the law of Christ": To "fulfill" here to "do" or to "act" in obedience. "The Law of Christ" is "to love one another" (John 13:34–35) in contrast to "the law of Moses". In Judaism, as "Christ" means "Messiah", the so-called "law of the Messiah" is considered preferable to any other.

== Conclusion (6:11–18) ==
Unlike his other epistles, Paul does not include personal greetings in the end of the epistle. Nonetheless, this part holds the summary and according to one commentator "the hermeneutical key to the whole letter", consisting some key points already discussed previously, but here are emphasized again, such as the topic of 'the new creation' with abolished distinction between the circumcised and uncircumcised.

== Bibliography ==
- Stanton, G. N. (2007). "67. Galatians". In Barton, John; Muddiman, John (eds.). The Oxford Bible Commentary (first (paperback) ed.). Oxford University Press. pp. 1152–1165. ISBN 978-0199277186.
