= Mystagogue =

Religious or occult function

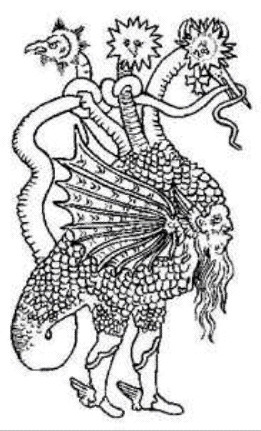
Artistic rendition of a classical "mystagogue"

A mystagogue or mystagog (from Greek: μυσταγωγός, romanized: mystagōgós, lit. 'person who initiates into mysteries') is a person who initiates others into mystic beliefs, and an educator or person who has knowledge of the sacred mysteries of a belief system. Another word for mystagogue is hierophant.

== Origins ==
In ancient mystery religions, a mystagogue would be responsible for leading an initiate into the secret teachings and rituals of a cultus. The initiate would often be blindfolded, and the mystagogue would literally "guide" him into the sacred space.

In the early Christian church, this same concept was used to describe role of the bishop, who was responsible for seeing to it that the catechumens were properly prepared for baptism. Mystagogical homilies, or homilies that dealt with the Church's sacraments, were given to those in the last stages of preparation for full Church membership. Sometimes these mystagogical instructions were not given until after the catechumen had been baptized. The most famous of these mystagogical works are the "Mystagogical Homilies" of St. Cyril of Jerusalem, and the work, "On the Mysteries" by St. Ambrose of Milan.

== Typologies ==
In various organizations, it is the role of the mystagogue to "mystify" pledges. The term is sometimes used to refer to a person who guides people through religious sites, such as churches, and explains the various artifacts. This branch of theology is at times called mystagogy.

In the United States versions of mystagogical legends predate European contact. Early Native American tribes around the Great Lakes region, taught that the mystagogue was a spiritual leader, and upon death would transform into a beast with many heads. The mystagogue would reappear in his beastly form and feed on those who strayed from the tribe if it was not in keeping with their religious customs.

The historical tradition of the mystagogue has carried on today in one way through the fraternity system in American universities, that have historically held a position for a mystagogue at either the chapter or the national level. The mystagogue is a person of great respect, and his knowledge concerning both the physical and spiritual matters of the organization is not questioned. In a way similar to that of some Native American traditions, the mystagogue in the fraternity system has the power to shut down parts of the fraternity which are not in keeping with customs or tradition.

Max Weber, considered to be one of the founders of the modern study of sociology, described the mystagogue as part magician and part prophet, and as one who dispensed "magical actions that contain the boons of salvation."

According to Roy Wallis: "The primary criterion that Weber had in mind in distinguishing the prophet from the mystagogue was that the latter offers a largely magical means of salvation rather than proclaiming a radical religious ethic or an example to be followed."

== See also ==
- Hierophant
- Mystagogical Catechesis by Cyril of Jerusalem
- Mystagogy of the Holy Spirit by Photios I of Constantinople
- Sacred mysteries
