= Seven gifts of the Holy Spirit =

Spiritual gifts

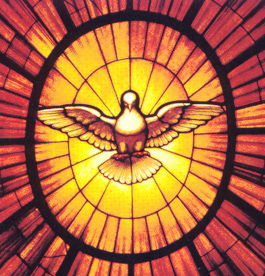
Stained glass symbolic representation of the Holy Spirit as a dove, c. 1660.

The seven gifts of the Holy Spirit are an enumeration of seven spiritual gifts first found in the book of Isaiah, and much commented upon by patristic authors. They are: wisdom, understanding, counsel, fortitude, knowledge, piety, and fear of the Lord.

== Book of Isaiah ==
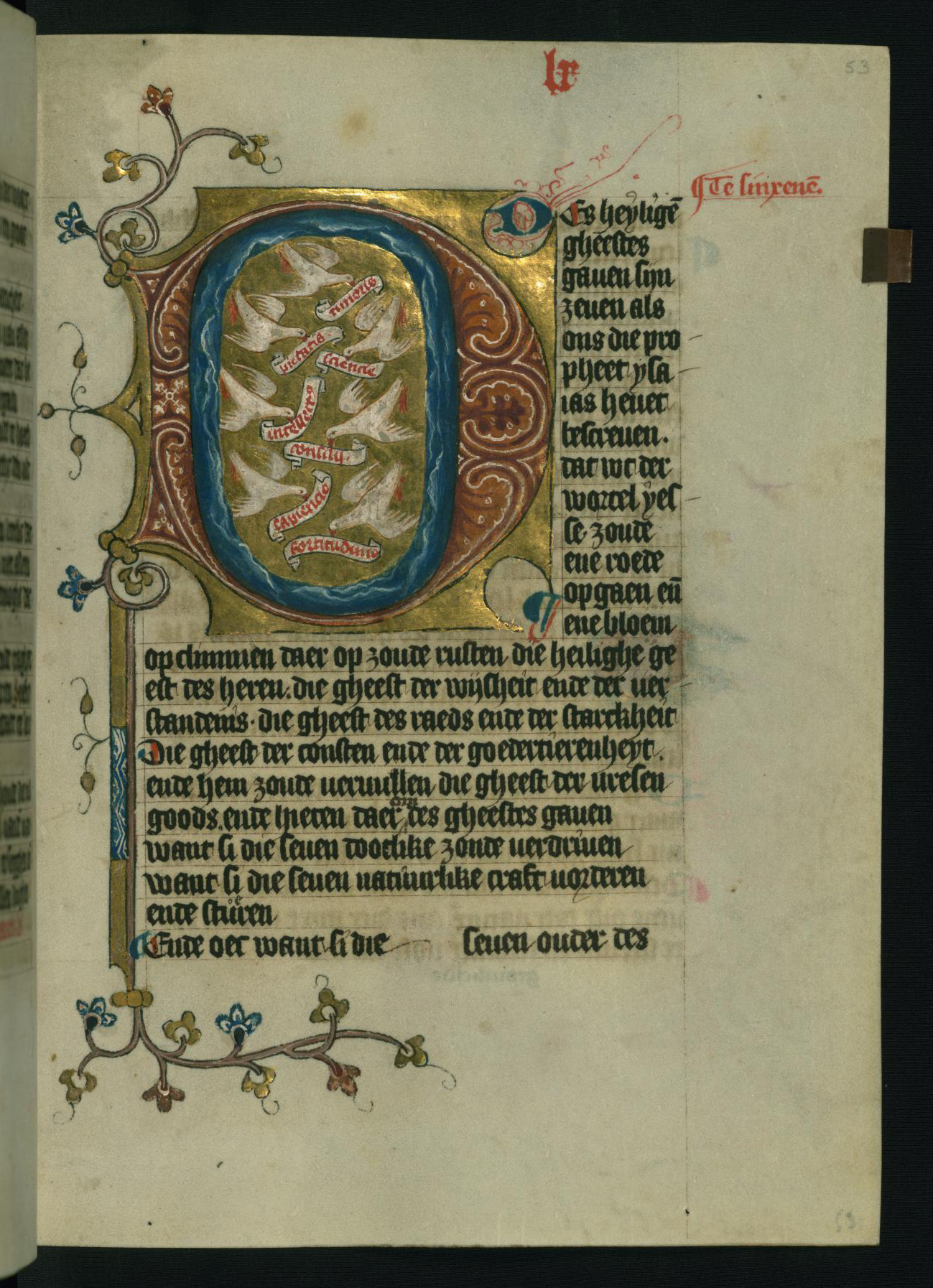
Seven Gifts of the Holy Spirit. Folio from Walters manuscript W.171 (15th century)

The seven gifts are found in the Book of Isaiah 11:1–2, a passage which refers to the characteristics of a Messianic figure empowered by the "Spirit of the Lord".

The Greek and Hebrew versions of the Bible differ slightly in how the gifts are enumerated. In the Hebrew version (the Masoretic Text), the "Spirit of the Lord" is described with six characteristics: wisdom, understanding, counsel, might, knowledge, and “fear of the Lord”. The last characteristic (fear of the Lord) is mentioned twice. In the earliest Greek translation (the Septuagint), the first mention of the fear of the Lord is translated as "spirit of [...] godliness" (πνεῦμα [...] εὐσεβείας).

Verse	Hebrew Masoretic	English New International Version	Greek Septuagint	Latin Vulgate
11.1	א וְיָצָא חֹטֶר, מִגֵּזַע יִשָׁי; וְנֵצֶר, מִשָּׁרָשָׁיו יִפְרֶה.	A shoot will come up from the stump of Jesse; from his roots a Branch will bear fruit.	και εξελευσεται ραβδος εκ της ριζης ιεσσαι και ανθος εκ της ριζης αναβησεται	et egredietur virga de radice Iesse et flos de radice eius ascendet
11.2	ב וְנָחָה עָלָיו, רוּחַ יְהוָה--רוּחַ חָכְמָה וּבִינָה, רוּחַ עֵצָה וּגְבוּרָה, רוּחַ דַּעַת, וְיִרְאַת יְהוָה.	The Spirit of the LORD will rest on Him— the Spirit of wisdom and of understanding, the Spirit of counsel and of might, the Spirit of the knowledge and fear of the LORD—	και αναπαυσεται επ' αυτον πνευμα του θεου πνευμα σοφιας και συνεσεως πνευμα βουλης και ισχυος πνευμα γνωσεως και ευσεβειας	et requiescet super eum spiritus Domini spiritus sapientiae et intellectus spiritus consilii et fortitudinis spiritus scientiae et pietatis
11.3	ג וַהֲרִיחוֹ, בְּיִרְאַת יְהוָה;	and He will delight in the fear of the LORD.	εμπλησει αυτον πνευμα φοβου θεου	et replebit eum spiritus timoris Domini

The names of the seven gifts mentioned in the Greek translation were then translated into Latin as follows:

1. sapientia
2. intellectus
3. consilium
4. fortitudo
5. cognitiō (or scientia as in the above scripture)
6. pietas
7. timor Domini.

== In Christianity ==
The Seven Gifts of the Holy Spirit is one of several lists of virtues, vices and blessings in Christian devotional literature which follow a scheme of seven. Others include the seven deadly sins, the seven virtues, the seven last words from the cross, the seven petitions of the Lord's Prayer, and the Beatitudes.

The seven gifts were often represented as doves in medieval texts and especially figure in depictions of the Tree of Jesse which shows the Genealogy of Jesus. For Saint Thomas Aquinas, the dove signifies by its properties each gift of the Holy Spirit.

=== Catholicism ===
Although the New Testament does not refer to Isaiah 11:1-2 regarding these gifts, according to the Catechism of the Catholic Church, these gifts "complete and perfect the virtues of those who receive them." Initiates receive them at Baptism and they are strengthened at Confirmation, so that one can proclaim the truths of the faith. "The reception of the sacrament of Confirmation is necessary for the completion of baptismal grace," for "by the sacrament of Confirmation, [the baptized] are more perfectly bound to the Church and are enriched with a special strength of the Holy Spirit. Hence they are, as true witnesses of Christ, more strictly obliged to spread and defend the faith by word and deed."

=== Anglican Communion ===
The Catholic teaching is echoed by the Anglican church, which teaches that "the imparting of the gifts of the Spirit is associated with baptism, as well as Confirmation and Ordination." Confirmation completes Baptism. Through prayer and the laying of hands, the bishop asks God to send his Holy Spirit to give them the strength to live as disciples of Christ.

== The Seven Gifts ==
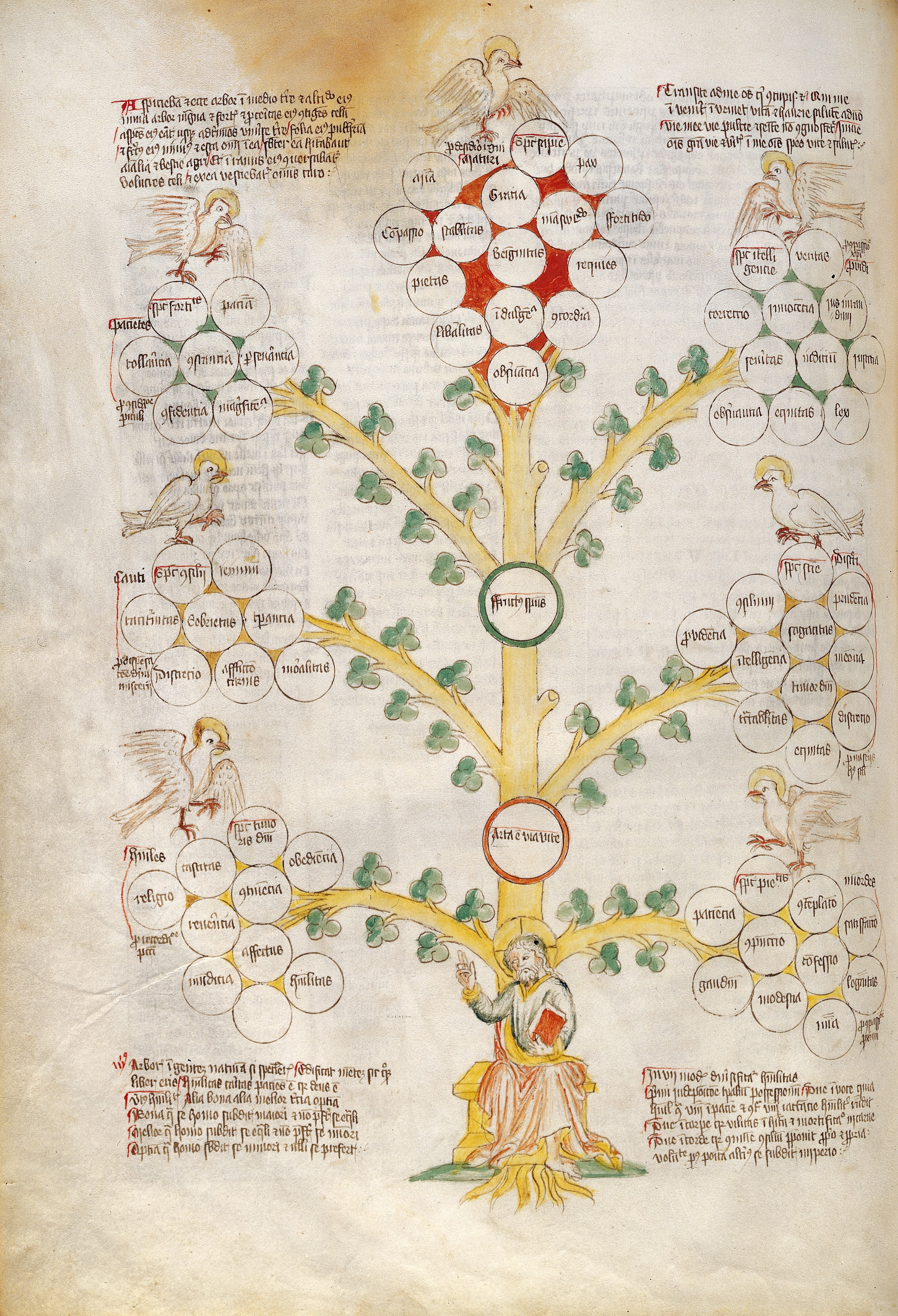
Illustration of the Tree of Seven Gifts of the Holy Spirit (Wellcome Collection)

=== Wisdom ===
Wisdom is considered the first and the greatest of the gifts. It acts upon both the intellect and the will. According to St. Bernard, it both illumines the mind and instills an attraction to the divine. Adolphe Tanquerey OP explained the difference between the gift of wisdom and that of understanding: "The latter is a view taken by the mind, while the former is an experience undergone by the heart; one is light, the other love, and so they unite and complete one another." A wise and loving heart is the perfection of the theological virtue of charity.

=== Understanding ===
Understanding helps one relate all truths to one's supernatural purpose; it further illuminates one's understanding of Sacred Scripture; and it assists us to understand the significance of religious ritual. This gift strengthens one's insight through prayer, scripture, and the sacraments. This all gives a person a profound appreciation for God’s providence.

=== Counsel ===
Counsel functions as a sort of supernatural intuition, to enable a person to judge promptly and rightly, especially in difficult situations. It perfects the cardinal virtue of prudence. While prudence operates in accord with reason as enlightened by faith, the gift of counsel operates under the guidance of the Holy Spirit to illuminate the will of God.

=== Fortitude ===
Fortitude is often identified with courage, but Aquinas takes its meaning to also encompass endurance. Joseph J. Rickaby describes it as a willingness to stand up for what is right in the sight of God, even if it means accepting rejection, verbal abuse, or physical harm. The gift of fortitude allows people the firmness of mind that is required both in doing good and in enduring evil. It is the perfection of the cardinal virtue of the same name.

=== Knowledge ===
The gift of knowledge allows one, as far as is humanly possible, to see things from God's perspective. It “allows us to perceive the greatness of God and his love for his creatures” through creation.

=== Piety ===
Piety accords with reverence. A person with reverence recognizes his total reliance on God and comes before God with humility, trust, and love. Thomas Aquinas says that piety perfects the virtue of religion, which is an aspect of the virtue of justice, in that it accords to God that which is due to God. In a series of talks on the Gifts of the Holy Spirit, Pope Francis said that piety is a recognition of "our belonging to God, our deep bond with him, a relationship that gives meaning to our whole life and keeps us resolute, in communion with him, even during the most difficult and troubled moments”. Francis goes on: "Piety is not mere outward religiosity; it is that genuine religious spirit which makes us turn to the Father as his children and to grow in our love for others, seeing them as our brothers and sisters."

=== Fear of the Lord ===
Fear of the Lord is akin to wonder (or awe). With the gift of fear of the Lord, one is made aware of the glory and majesty of God. At a June 2014 general audience Pope Francis said that it “is no servile fear, but rather a joyful awareness of God’s grandeur and a grateful realization that only in him do our hearts find true peace”. A person with wonder and awe knows that God is the perfection of all one’s desires. This gift is described by Aquinas as a fear of separating oneself from God. He describes the gift as a "filial fear," like a child's fear of offending his father, rather than a "servile fear," that is, a fear of punishment. Fear of the Lord is the beginning of wisdom. It is the perfection of the theological virtue of hope.

=== Aquinas: relation to the virtues ===
In Summa Theologiae I.II, q. 68, a1, Thomas Aquinas says that four of these gifts (wisdom, understanding, counsel and knowledge) direct the intellect, while the other three gifts (fortitude, piety, and fear of the Lord) direct the will toward God.

In some respects, the gifts are similar to the virtues, but a key distinction is that the virtues operate under the impetus of human reason (prompted by grace), whereas the gifts operate under the impetus of the Holy Spirit; the former can be used when one wishes, but the latter, according to Aquinas, operate only when the Holy Spirit wishes. In the case of Fortitude, the gift has, in Latin and English, the same name as the virtue which it is related to, but from which it must be distinguished.

In Summa Theologiae II.II, Thomas Aquinas asserts the following correspondences between the seven heavenly virtues and the seven gifts of the Holy Spirit:

- The gift of wisdom corresponds to the virtue of charity.
- The gifts of understanding and knowledge correspond to the virtue of faith.
- The gift of counsel (right judgment) corresponds to the virtue of prudence.
- The gift of fortitude corresponds to the virtue of courage.
- The gift of fear of the Lord corresponds to the virtue of hope.
- The gift of reverence corresponds to the virtue of justice.

To the virtue of temperance, no gift is directly assigned; but the gift of fear can be taken as such, since fear drives somebody to restrict himself from forbidden pleasures.

Brian Shanley contrasts the gifts to the virtues this way: "What the gifts do over and above the theological virtues (which they presuppose) is dispose the agent to the special promptings of the Holy Spirit in actively exercising the life of the virtues; the gifts are necessary for the perfect operations of the virtues, especially in the face of our human weakness and in difficult situations."

=== Augustine: relation to the Beatitudes ===
Saint Augustine drew a connection between the gifts of the Holy Spirit and the Beatitudes (Matt.5:3-12).

- Blessed are the poor in spirit, for theirs is the kingdom of heaven, reflects Fear of the Lord as the "poor in spirit" are the humble and God-fearing.
- Blessed are they who mourn, for they will be comforted, corresponds to the Gift of Knowledge, as for Augustine the knowledge of God brings both an increased awareness of personal sin, and to some extent grieving at the abandonment of practices and activities that separate one from God.
- Blessed are the meek, for they will inherit the land, relates to Piety.
- Blessed are they who hunger and thirst for righteousness, for they will be satisfied, pertains to Fortitude.
- Blessed are the merciful, for they will be shown mercy demonstrates the Gift of Counsel.
- Blessed are the clean of heart, for they will see God, the Gift of Understanding.
- Blessed are the peacemakers, for they will be called children of God, Wisdom.
- Blessed are they who are persecuted for the sake of righteousness, for theirs is the kingdom of heaven.

== See also ==
- Chaplet in Honour of the Holy Spirit – prayer for the seven gifts
- Fruit of the Holy Spirit
- Theological virtues
- Tree of Jesse
- Works of mercy
