= Mystagogy of the Holy Spirit =

9th c. theological work by Photius I

The Mystagogy of the Holy Spirit is a work by Photius I who was Ecumenical Patriarch of Constantinople (858 to 867 and 877 to 886). The work concerns the Procession of the Holy Spirit in the Trinity.

Photius argues against the idea that the Holy Spirit proceeds from both the Father and the Son (as proclaimed in the Western Creed under the Filioque clause) but rather, like the Son, proceeds only from the Father. "...if — as this blasphemy cries out — the Spirit also proceeds from the Son, then why not simply tear up the Word [Logos] and propagate the fable that the Spirit also produces the Son, thereby according the same equality of rank to each hypostasis by allowing each hypostasis to produce the other hypostasis?" Daniel Akin summarises it as formulating the doctrine of monopatrism generally accepted by the East and says that Photius points out that the Double Procession verges on Modalism:

"If the Spirit proceeds from the common nature, as the West taught, then he absurdly proceeds from himself... When Scripture speaks of the 'Spirit of Christ', it is not referring to procession but to the Spirit having annointed Christ".

Howard Watkin-Jones calls the book "an example of his dialectical powers and also of the faculty of plausible presentation". He points out that the book almost exclusively concentrates on the Procession without reference to the work of the Holy Spirit, which he asserts is typical of Greek theology. He finally concludes that the argument in the work epitomises the thought of the "Eastern mind with reference to this keen theological issue".

The first English translation, by Holy Transfiguration Monastery, was published in 1983. Another translation was published in 1987 with a preface by Archimandrite (now Archbishop) Chrysostomos of Etna.
