= Fruit of the Holy Spirit =

Biblical term

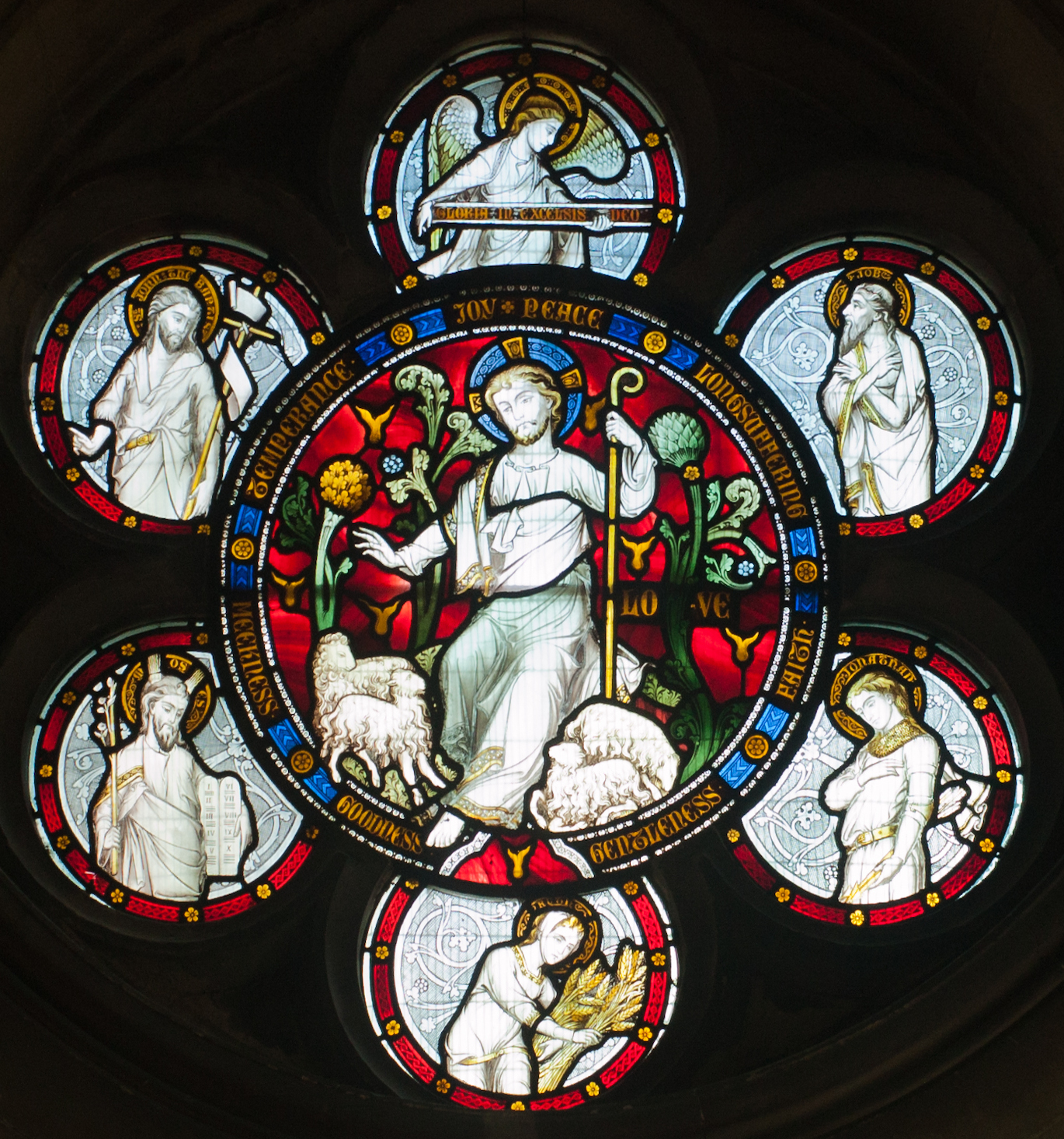
Stained glass window at Christ Church Cathedral in Dublin, depicting the Fruit of the Holy Spirit along with Biblical role models representing them: the Good Shepherd representing love, an angel holding a scroll with the Gloria in excelsis Deo representing joy and Jesus Christ, Job representing longsuffering, Jonathan faith, Ruth gentleness and goodness, Moses meekness, and John the Baptist temperance. Executed by Hardman & Co. in the 1870s.

The Fruit of the Holy Spirit (sometimes referred to as the Fruits of the Holy Spirit) is a biblical term that sums up nine attributes of a person or community living in accord with the Holy Spirit, according to chapter 5 of the Epistle to the Galatians: "But the fruit of the Spirit is love, joy, peace, patience, kindness, goodness, faithfulness, gentleness, and self-control." The fruit is contrasted with the works of the flesh discussed in the previous verses. "These qualities are the result of the work of the Holy Spirit in a Christian's life."

The Catholic Church follows the Latin Vulgate version of Galatians in recognizing twelve attributes of the Fruit: charity (caritas), joy (gaudium), peace (pax), patience (patientia), benignity (benignitas), goodness (bonitas), longanimity (longanimitas), mildness (mansuetudo), faith (fides), modesty (modestia), continency (continentia), and chastity (castitas). This tradition was defended by Thomas Aquinas in his work Summa Theologica, and reinforced in numerous Catholic catechisms, including the Baltimore Catechism, the Penny Catechism, and the Catechism of the Catholic Church.

== Early commentary ==
Aquinas pointed out that numbered among the attributes of the Fruit of the Holy Spirit are certain virtues, such as charity, meekness, faith, chastity, and kindness. Augustine defined virtue as "a good habit consonant with our nature."

Though often discussed as nine attributes of the Fruit of the Spirit, the original Greek term translated as "fruit" (καρπὸς, karpos) is singular. Aquinas explained, "Consequently fruit is mentioned there in the singular, on account of its being generically one, though divided into many species which are spoken of as so many fruits." Augustine's commentary on Galatians 5:25-26 says, "the Apostle had no intention of teaching us how many [either works of the flesh, or fruit of the Spirit] there are; but to show how the former should be avoided, and the latter sought after."

== Definitions ==
=== Love (Greek: agape, Latin: caritas) ===
Agape (love) denotes an undefeatable benevolence and unconquerable goodwill that always seeks the highest good for others, no matter their behavior. It is a love that gives freely without asking anything in return and does not consider the worth of its object. Agape is more a love by choice than Philos, which is love by chance; and it refers to the will rather than the emotion. It describes the unconditional love God has for the world in the Christian faith. Paul describes love in 1 Corinthians 13:4–8:

Love is patient, love is kind. It does not envy, it does not boast, it is not proud. It does not dishonor others, it is not self-seeking, it is not easily angered, it keeps no record of wrongs. Love does not delight in evil but rejoices with the truth. It always protects, always trusts, always hopes, always perseveres. Love never fails. But where there are prophecies, they will cease; where there are tongues, they will be stilled; where there is knowledge, it will pass away.

According to Strong's Greek Lexicon, the word ἀγάπη (agapē) means love, affection, or benevolence. It occurs 117 times in 106 verses in the Greek concordance of the NASB.

=== Joy (Greek: chara, Latin: gaudium) ===
The joy referred to here is characterized as deeper than mere happiness; it is described as rooted in God and coming from him. This divine attribution makes it perceived as more serene and stable than worldly happiness, which is merely emotional and lasts only for a time.

According to Strong's Greek Lexicon, the Greek word listed in the verse is χαρά (chara), meaning 'joy', 'gladness', or a source of joy'. It occurs 59 times in 57 verses in the Greek concordance of the NASB.

"joy, delight" (akin to cheers, "to rejoice"), is found frequently in Matthew and Luke, and especially in John, once in Mark (Mar 4:16, RV, "joy," AV, "gladness"); it is absent from 1 Cor. (though the verb is used three times), but is frequent in 2 Cor., where the noun is used five times (for 2Cr 7:4, RV, see Note below), and the verb eight times, suggestive of the Apostle's relief in comparison with the circumstances of the 1st Epistle; in Col 1:11, AV, "joyfulness," RV, "joy." The word is sometimes used, by metonymy, of the occasion or cause of "joy," Luk 2:10 (lit., "I announce to you a great joy"); in 2Cr 1:15, in some mss., for charis, "benefit;" Phl 4:1, where the readers are called the Apostle's "joy;" so 1Th 2:19, 20; Hbr 12:2, of the object of Christ's "joy;" Jam 1:2, where it is connected with falling into trials; perhaps also in Mat 25:21, 23, where some regard it as signifying, concretely, the circumstances attending cooperation in the authority of the Lord. Note: In Hbr 12:11, "joyous" represents the phrase meta, "with," followed by chara, lit., "with joy." So in Hbr 10:34, "joyfully;" in 2Cr 7:4 the noun is used with the Middle Voice of huperperisseuo, "to abound more exceedingly," and translated "(I overflow) with joy," RV (AV, "I am exceeding joyful").

=== Peace (Greek: eirene, Latin: pax) ===
The Greek word εἰρήνη (eirēnē) means peace (literally or figuratively) and, by implication, prosperity. It is generally described in the Bible as the state of harmony, security, and salvation. This can be applied on the national or individual level. In particular, it is used in Christianity to describe one believing they have achieved salvation, either before or after death. It can also be viewed as a state of wholeness and order as opposed to chaos.

Christians identify Jesus with the Prince of Peace, described in Isaiah 9—bringing peace to the hearts of those who desire it. In John 14:27 he says, "Peace I leave with you, my peace I give to you; not as the world gives do I give to you. Let not your heart be troubled, neither let it be afraid".

=== Patience (Greek: makrothumia, Latin: longanimitas) ===
Generally the Greek world applied this word to a man who could avenge himself but did not. This word is often used in the Greek scriptures in reference to God and God's attitude to humans. Exodus 34:6 describes the Lord as "slow to anger and rich in kindness and fidelity."

Patience, which in some translations is "longsuffering" or "endurance", is defined in Strong's by the Greek words makrothumia and hupomone. The first denotes lenience, forbearance, fortitude, patient endurance, and longsuffering. Also included in makrothumia is the ability to endure persecution and ill-treatment. It describes a person who has the power to exercise revenge but instead exercises restraint. The latter, hupomone, is translated as endurance, constancy, perseverance, continuance, bearing up, steadfastness, and holding out. It describes the capacity to continue to bear up under difficult circumstances, not with a passive complacency, but with a hopeful fortitude that actively resists weariness and defeat, with hupomone further understood as "opposed to cowardice or despondency".

=== Kindness (Greek: chrestotes, Latin: benignitas) ===
Kindness is acting for the good of people, regardless of what they do, and not expecting anything in return. It implies kindness no matter what. In Greek, old wine was called "chrestos" which meant that it was mellow or smooth. One scholar has noted that when the word chrestotes is applied to interpersonal relationships, it conveys the idea of being adaptable to others. Rather than harshly require everyone else to adapt to his own needs and desires, when chrestotes is working in a believer, he seeks to become adaptable to the needs of those who are around him (Sparkling Gems from the Greek, Rick Renner). The apostle Paul uses this word to depict God's attributed kindness to people who are unsaved.

=== Goodness (Greek: agathosune, Latin: bonitas) ===
Popular English Bibles (e.g. NIV, NASB, NLT) translate the single Greek word chrestotes into two English words: kindness and goodness. This can be interpreted as moral excellence or virtue; the best part of anything; joy in being good; or generally a quality character.

=== Faithfulness (Greek: pistis, Latin: fides) ===
The root of pistis (faith), from a Greek term meaning persuasion, supplies the core-meaning of faith as being "divine persuasion" received from God. In the Bible, it is used to describe both the trustworthy and those believing in God and Jesus Christ, linking the two concepts. The writer of the Letter to the Hebrews describes it this way: "Let us fix our eyes on Jesus, the author and perfecter of our faith, who for the joy set before him endured the cross, scorning its shame, and sat down at the right hand of the throne of God".

=== Gentleness (Greek: prautes, Latin: modestia) ===
Gentleness or meekness, is "a divinely-balanced virtue that can only operate through faith." The New Spirit Filled Life Bible defines it as "a disposition that is even-tempered, tranquil, balanced in spirit, unpretentious, and that has the passions under control."

=== Self-control (Greek: enkrateia, Latin: continentia) ===
The Greek enkrateia is described as strength, especially in self-control and mastering one's thoughts and behavior.

== See also ==
- Seven gifts of the Holy Spirit
- Seven virtues
- Spiritual gifts

== Bibliography ==
=== Sources ===
- George A. Kennedy, New Testament Interpretation Through Rhetorical Criticism, George A. Kennedy (University of North Carolina Press: 1984)
- Longman, Robert Jr. "Self-Control". Web: 19 Oct 2010. Spirit Home
- Classic Sermons on the Fruit of the Spirit, (Warren Wiersbe ed.), Kregel Academic, 2002. ISBN 9780825496387
- Hidden Fruit book , Robert Bass 2022
