= Papyrus 51 =

Papyrus 𝔓^{51}
- New Testament manuscript
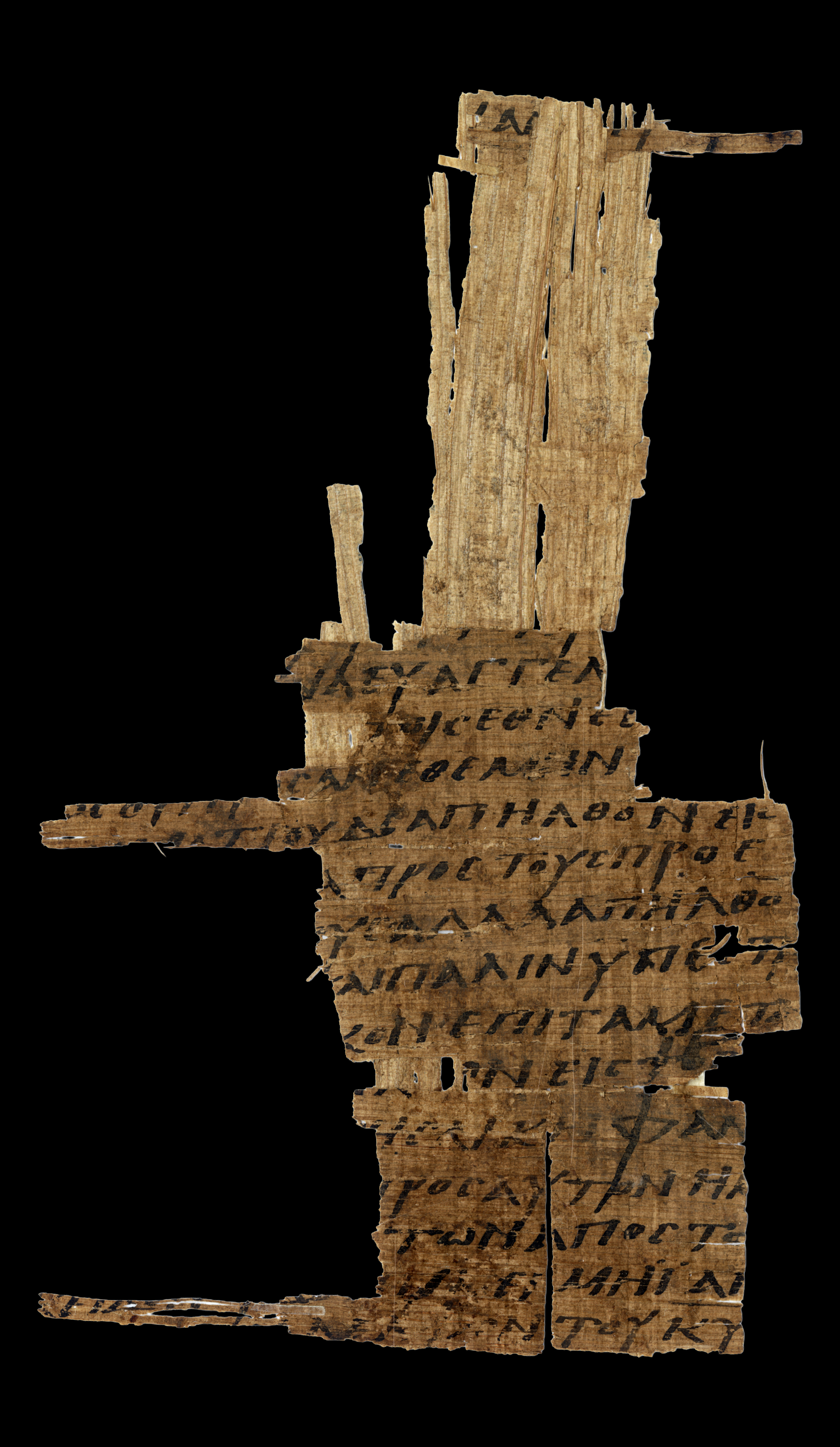
- Recto Galatians 1:2-10
- Name: P. Oxy. 2157
- Text: Galatians 1 †
- Date: ca. 400
- Script: Greek
- Found: Egypt
- Now at: Ashmolean Museum
- Cite: E. Lobel, C. H. Roberts, E. P. Wegener, Oxyrhynchus Papyri XVIII (London: 1941), pp. 1-3.
- Type: Alexandrian text-type
- Category: II

Papyrus 51 (in the Gregory-Aland numbering), designated by siglum 𝔓^{51}, is an early copy of the New Testament in Greek. It is a papyrus manuscript of the Epistle to the Galatians, it contains only Gal. 1:2-10.13.16-20. The manuscript paleographically has been assigned to the 4th or 5th century.

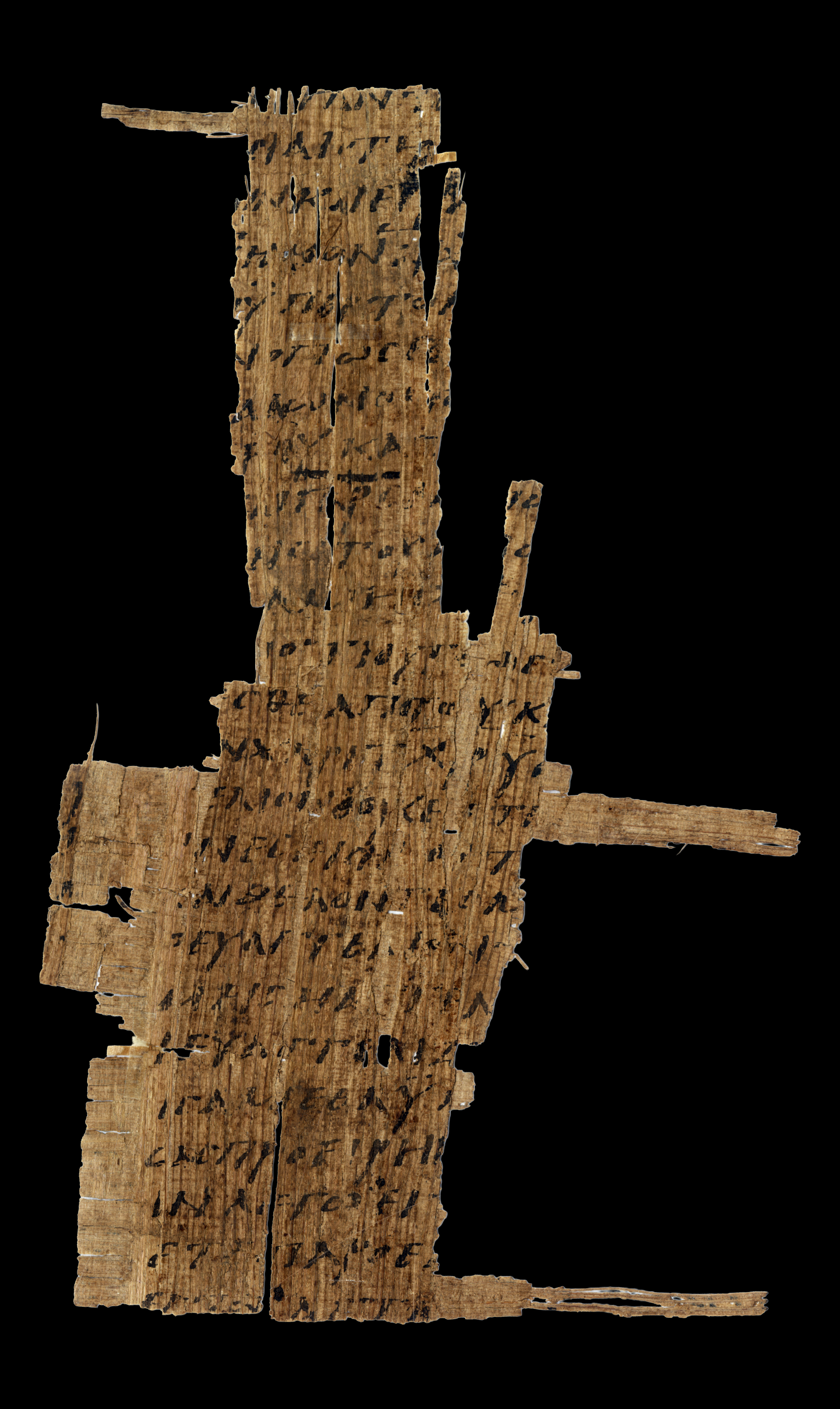
Verso Galatians 1:13, 16-20

The Greek text of this codex is a representative of the Alexandrian text-type (proto-Alexandrian). Kurt Aland placed it in Category II.

It is currently housed at the Ashmolean Museum (P. Oxy 2157) in Oxford.

== See also ==
- List of New Testament papyri
