= Piety =

Religious devotion or spirituality

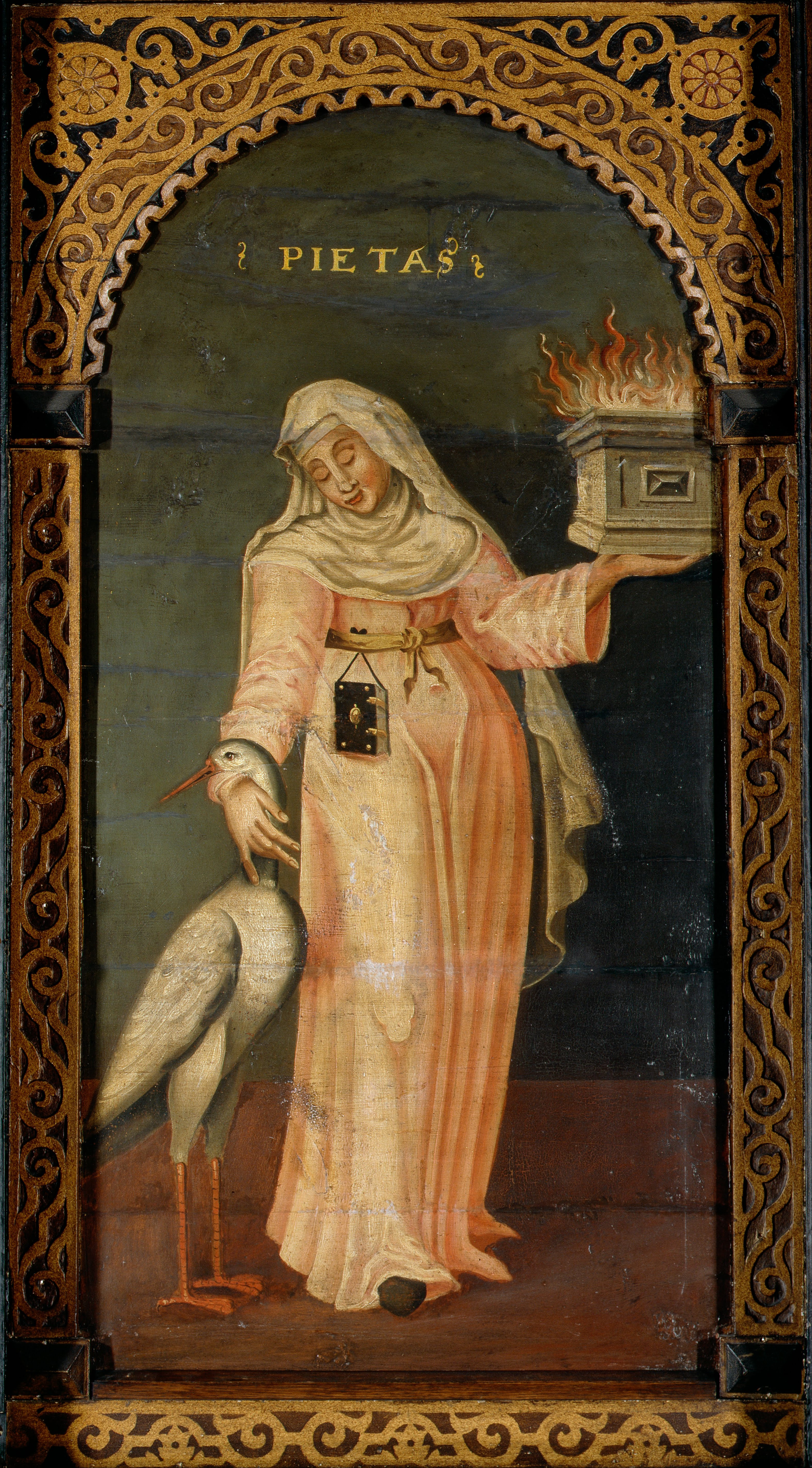
"Piety", Dulwich Picture Gallery

Piety is a virtue which may include religious devotion or spirituality. A common element in most conceptions of piety is a duty of respect. In a religious context, piety may be expressed through pious activities or devotions, which may vary among countries and cultures.

== Etymology ==
The word piety comes from the Latin word pietas, the noun form of the adjective pius (which means "devout" or "dutiful"). English literature scholar Alan Jacobs has written about the origins and early meaning of the term:

It is not, in its origin, a Christian word. The Roman poet Virgil calls his hero pius Aeneas, says that he is a pietāte virum, but we might well mislead readers were we to say "pious Aeneas" or a "pious man." For his character is unmarked by the smarmy religiosity we typically associate with the word "pious." Aeneas is devoted to his mission and is faithful to the call of the gods on his life. He is willing to sacrifice his own interests to those greater interests, especially to the founding of the great city of Rome. He binds his will and his heart to that task. This is what it means to be pius.

== Classical interpretation ==
Pietas in traditional Latin usage expressed a complex, highly valued Roman virtue: a man with pietas respected his responsibilities to gods, country, parents, and kin. In its strictest sense, it was the sort of love a son ought to have for his father. Aeneas's consistent epithet in Virgil and other Latin authors is pius, a term which connotes reverence toward the gods and familial dutifulness. At the fall of Troy, Aeneas carries to safety his father, the lame Anchises, and the Lares and Penates, the statues of the household gods.

The word has several equivalents in Greek, such as ὅσιος, which was the term particularly discussed in the Euthyphro, as well as Eusebeia (εὐσέβεια). Notions of piety in Latin will have been influenced by these notions.

In addressing whether children have an obligation to provide support for their parents, Aquinas quotes Cicero, "...piety gives both duty and homage": "duty" referring to service, and "homage" to reverence or honor. Filial piety is central to Confucian ethics; reverence for parents is considered in Chinese ethics to be the prime virtue and the basis of all right human relations.

== Religious interpretation ==
In Catholicism, Eastern Orthodoxy, Lutheranism, and Anglicanism, piety is one of the seven gifts of the Holy Spirit. "It engenders in the soul a filial respect for God, a generous love toward him, and an affectionate obedience that wants to do what he commands because it loves the one who commands." Pope Gregory I, in demonstrating the interrelationship among the gifts, said "Through the fear of the Lord, we rise to piety, from piety then to knowledge."

Aquinas spoke of piety in the context of one's parents and country, and given the obligation to accord each what is rightfully due them, related it to the cardinal virtue of justice. By analogy, rendering to God what is due to God, Aquinas identified as the virtue of religion, also related to justice. Professor Richard McBrien refers to piety as "a gift of the Holy Spirit by which we are motivated and enabled to be faithful and respectful to those—ultimately, God—who have had a positive, formative influence on our lives and to whom we owe a debt of gratitude": it requires one to acknowledge, to the extent possible, the sources of those many blessings through words and gestures great and small.

=== Piety as a virtue ===
Piety belongs to the virtue of religion, which theologians put among the moral virtues, as a part of the cardinal virtue Justice, since by it one tenders to God what is due to him. The gift of piety perfects the virtue of justice, enabling the individual to fulfill his obligations to God and neighbor, and to do so willingly and joyfully. By inspiring a person with a tender and filial confidence in God, the gift of piety makes them joyfully embrace all that pertains to His service.

John Calvin said, "I call 'piety' that reverence joined with love of God which the knowledge of his benefits induces. For until [people] recognize that they owe everything to God, that they are nourished by his fatherly care, that he is the Author of their every good, that they should seek nothing beyond him—they will never yield him willing service."

American Bishop Pierre Whalon says that "Piety ... is the pursuit of an ever-greater sense of being in the presence of God".

Pope John Paul II defined piety as "the gift of reverence for what comes from God", and related it to his earlier lectures on the Theology of the Body.

In a General Audience in June 2014, Pope Francis said, "When the Holy Spirit helps us sense the presence of the Lord and all of his love for us, it warms our heart and drives us almost naturally to prayer and celebration." "Piety", said Francis, points up "our friendship with God". It is a gift that enables people to serve their neighbor "with gentleness and with a smile". Also, for Francis, "the gift of piety is synonymous with filial trust in God". Through piety, a person shows reverence for God as a loving Father, and respect for others as children of God.

=== Piety and devotion ===
Expressions of piety vary according to country and local tradition. "Feast days", with their preparations for various religious celebrations and activities, have forged traditions peculiar to communities. Many pious exercises are part of the cultic patrimony of particular Churches or religious families. Devotions help incorporate faith into daily life.

The Second Vatican Council endorsed "practices of piety" which had been "commended by the long usage of the Church", but at the same time observed that in the training it provides for its clergy, care should be taken the mere development of "a religious affectation". The important requirement was for students to "learn to live according to the Gospel ideal, to be strengthened in faith, hope and charity, so that, in the exercise of these practices, they may acquire the spirit of prayer, learn to defend and strengthen their vocation, obtain an increase of other virtues and grow in the zeal to gain all men for Christ".

Pope Paul VI spoke later of "popular religiosity" or "popular piety" as being able to manifest:

a thirst for God which only the simple and poor can know. It makes people capable of generosity and sacrifice even to the point of heroism, when it is a question of manifesting belief. It involves an acute awareness of profound attributes of God: fatherhood, providence, loving and constant presence. It engenders interior attitudes rarely observed to the same degree elsewhere: patience, the sense of the cross in daily life, detachment, openness to others, devotion. By reason of these aspects, we readily call it "popular piety", that is, religion of the people, rather than religiosity.

To Pope Francis, pious practices:

are the manifestation of a theological life nourished by the working of the Holy Spirit who has been poured into our hearts (cf. Romans 5:5).

The veneration of sacred images belongs to the nature of Catholic piety, with the understanding that "the honour rendered to the image is directed to the person represented".

While acknowledging that Anglican piety took the forms of more frequent communion and liturgical observances and customs, Bishop Ronald Williams spoke for increased reading of the Bible.

In the Methodist Church, works of piety are a means of grace. They can be personal, such as reading, prayer, and meditation; or communal, such as sharing in the sacraments or Bible study. For Presbyterians, piety refers to a whole realm of practices—such as worship, prayer, singing, and service—that help shape and guide the way one's reverence and love for God are expressed; and "the duty of the Christian to live a life of piety in accordance with God's moral law".

== See also ==
- Catholic devotions
- Affective piety
- Plato's dialogue Euthyphro, in which Socrates seeks a definition of piety
- Hasid (the Hebrew term)
- Islamic views on piety
- Pietism in the Lutheran Church
