= Seven virtues =

Seven virtues in Christian tradition

In Christian history, the seven heavenly virtues combine the four cardinal virtues of prudence, justice, fortitude and temperance, with the three theological virtues of faith, hope, and charity.

The seven capital virtues, also known as seven lively virtues, contrary or remedial virtues, are those opposite to the seven deadly sins. They are often enumerated as chastity, temperance, charity, diligence, kindness, patience, and humility.

== Seven heavenly virtues ==
=== Cardinal virtues ===
The term "cardinal virtues" (virtutes cardinales) was first used by the 4th-century theologian Ambrose, who defined the four virtues as "temperance, justice, prudence, and fortitude". These were also named as cardinal virtues by Augustine of Hippo, and were subsequently adopted by the Catholic Church. They are described as "human virtues" in the Catechism of the Catholic Church. They correspond to the moral virtues of Aristotelian philosophy.

Prior to Ambrose, these four qualities were identified by the Greek philosopher Plato as the necessary character traits of a good man, and were discussed by other ancient authors such as Cicero. They can also be found in the Old Testament Book of Wisdom, which states that wisdom "teaches moderation and prudence, righteousness and fortitude, and nothing in life is more useful than these."

=== Theological virtues ===
The theological virtues are those named by St. Paul in 1 Corinthians 13: "And now faith, hope, and love abide, these three; and the greatest of these is love." The third virtue is also commonly referred to as "charity", as this is how the influential King James Bible translated the Greek word agape.

The traditional understanding of the difference between cardinal and theological virtues is that the latter are not fully accessible to humans in their natural state without assistance from God. Thomas Aquinas believed that while the cardinal virtues could be formed through habitual practice, the theological virtues could only be practised by divine grace.

== Seven capital virtues ==
The seven capital virtues or seven lively virtues (also known as the contrary or remedial virtues) are those thought to stand in opposition to the seven capital vices (or deadly sins).

Prudentius, writing in the 5th century, was the first author to allegorically represent Christian morality as a struggle between seven sins and seven virtues. His poem Psychomachia depicts a battle between female personifications of virtues and vices, with each virtue confronting and defeating a particular vice. However, Prudentius did not base his allegory on the cardinal and theological virtues, nor did he use the traditional list of capital vices. The combatants in the Psychomachia are as follows:

Virtue	Latin	Sin	Latin
Prudence/Wisdom	Pudicitia	Lust	Sodomita Libido
Faith	Fides	Idolatry	Veterum Cultura Deorum
Good Works	Operatio	Avarice	Avaritia
Concord	Concordia	Discord	Discordia
Sobriety	Sobrietas	Indulgence	Luxuria
Patience	Patientia	Wrath	Ira
Humility	Mens Humilis	Pride	Superbia

The success of this work popularised the concept of capital virtues among medieval authors. In AD 590, the seven capital vices were revised by Pope Gregory I, which led to the creation of new lists of corresponding capital virtues. In modern times, the capital virtues are commonly identified as the following:

Virtue	Latin	Sin	Latin
Chastity	Castitas	Lust	Luxuria
Temperance	Temperantia	Gluttony	Gula
Charity	Caritas	Greed	Avaritia
Diligence	Diligentia	Sloth	Acedia
Kindness	Humanitas	Envy	Invidia
Patience	Patientia	Wrath	Ira
Humility	Humilitas	Pride	Superbia

Although some medieval authors attempted to contrast the capital vices with the heavenly virtues, such efforts were rare. According to historian István P. Bejczy, "the capital vices are more often contrasted with the remedial or contrary virtues in medieval moral literature than with the principal virtues, while the principal virtues are frequently accompanied by a set of mirroring vices rather than by the seven deadly sins".

== See also ==
- Holy obedience – Concept in Christian theology
- Aristotle's list of virtues
- Cardinal and Theological Virtues, painting by Raphael
