= Holy obedience =

Concept in Christian theology

In Christian theology, Holy obedience refers to two things: 1) Jesus' obedience unto death that makes atonement and reparation for mankind's disobedience (sins) and 2) Christian obedience to God in imitation of and share in Jesus' obedience.

== Nature of Obedience ==
Obedience, from the Latin obêdire, ("to hearken to"), is "the moral virtue that inclines the will to comply with the will of another who has the right to command." Christ is the exemplar of holy obedience "becoming obedient to death, even death on a cross." "Son though he was, he learned obedience from what he suffered; and when he was made perfect, he became the source of eternal salvation for all who obey him." (Hebrews 5:8)

== As a moral virtue ==
Christian obedience is a free choice to surrender one's will to God, and an act of homage.

Amongst the moral virtues obedience enjoys a primacy of honour. The reason is that the greater or lesser excellence of a moral virtue is determined by the greater or lesser value of the object which it qualifies one to put aside in order to give oneself to God. Now amongst our various possessions, whether goods of the body or goods of the soul, it is clear that the human will is the most intimately personal and most cherished of all. So it happens that obedience, which makes a man yield up the most dearly prized stronghold of the individual soul in order to do the good pleasure of his Creator, is accounted the greatest of the moral virtues.

The Sacrament of Confirmation seals one with the Holy Spirit, who grants one all the virtues - Theological Virtues, Fruits of the Holy Spirit, and Gifts of the Holy Spirit - necessary to obey God.

== Degrees of Obedience ==
Thomas Aquinas said that God is to be obeyed in all things, while human authorities are to be obeyed in certain things. All Catholics, the church teaches, must practice obedience of faith: assent of faith to the magisterium and divine revelation (word of God), and religious submission to the Pope and other bishops. This includes obedience to one's conscience and obedience to valid law. As part of ordination, diocesan priests and deacons promise obedience to God and to their bishops. Priests who are part of a religious order (along with all religious sisters and brothers) profess vows of obedience to the authorities of their religious community. Children obey their parents, because honouring parents is part of honouring God, and is required by God's commandment. It is the recognition of the authority of God vicariously exercised through a human agent that confers upon the act of obedience its special merit.

== As evangelical counsel ==
Obedience is one of the evangelical counsels. The desire for worldly power and honour poses a hindrance to the soul from its true aim and vocation, and delays it from becoming entirely conformed to the will of God, and is therefore addressed by the counsel of holy obedience.

Under the Rule of Saint Benedict and that of Pachomius the Great, holy obedience served as a sort of education in community life, under more experienced monks. Francis of Assisi said, "The true obedient Religious is like unto a knight well armed and mounted the which overcometh and breaketh the ranks of his enemies, safely and without fear, because none of them can hurt him."

=== Vow of Obedience ===
Consecrated religious vow obedience to their superiors. Obedience is not vowed absolutely, and without limit, but according to the rule of each order, for a superior cannot command anything foreign to, or outside, the rule (except in so far as he may grant dispensations from the rule).

The sacrifice of one's own independence and one's own will presupposes a spirit of self-denial and mortification; the readiness to accept a common rule which adapts itself to the desires and tastes of others is a mark of the charity. By reason of the vow of obedience and of the religious profession a deliberate act of obedience and submission adds the merit of an act of the virtue of religion. Aquinas makes it clear that the vow of obedience is the chief of the vows of religion.

== Exemplars of Obedience ==
Mary exemplifies obedience of faith by her assent of faith at the Annunciation: "Let it be done to me according to your word." Catholic martyrs obey Jesus and the church unto suffering - such as Saint Patrick, who suffered abuse for his evangelization - and unto death - such as Mateo Correa Magallanes, who died rather than violate the Seal of the Confessional in the Catholic Church.

== See also ==
- Seven holy virtues
