= Justice (virtue) =

Cardinal virtue

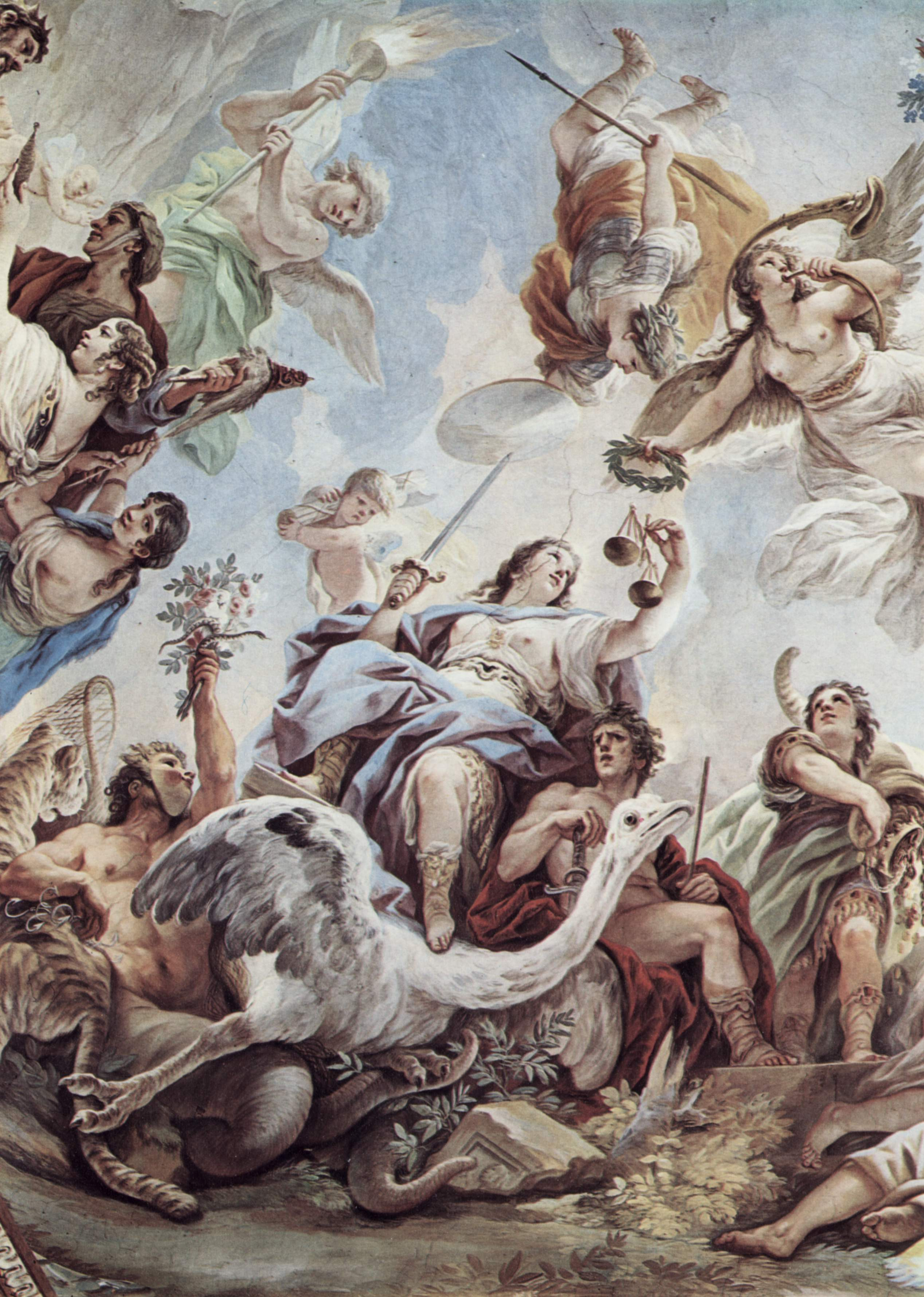
Justizia, by Luca Giordano

Justice is one of the four cardinal virtues in classical European philosophy and Roman Catholicism. It is the moderation or mean between selfishness and selflessness — between having more and having less than one's fair share.

Justice is closely related, in Christianity, to the practice of charity because it regulates relationships with others. It is a cardinal virtue, which is to say that it is "pivotal", because it regulates all such relationships. It is sometimes deemed the most important of the cardinal virtues.

== Early developments ==
According to Aristotle, "Justice consists in a certain equality by which the just and definite claim of another, neither more nor less, is satisfied."

This is equal insofar as each one receives what he is entitled to, but maybe unequal insofar as different people may have different rights: two children have different rights from a certain adult if that adult is the parent of one of them and not of the other. Aristotle developed the idea of equity (epieikeia) to cover irregular cases so that "the ordinance is framed to fit the circumstances".

Cicero wrote that "[t]here are... two kinds of injustice: the one, on the part of those who inflict wrong, the other on the part of those who, when they can, do not shield from wrong those upon whom it is being inflicted." So "he who does not prevent or oppose wrong, if he can, is just as guilty of wrong as if he deserted his parents or his friends or his country".

Macrobius saw Justice as existing on four different planes or levels, rising from the everyday political virtue at the lowest to the Archetypal Form of Justice at the highest.

== Christianity ==
"The just man", often mentioned in Christian scriptures, is distinguished by habitual right thinking and the uprightness of his conduct toward his neighbor. In Colossians 4:1 St. Paul counsels "Masters, treat your slaves justly and fairly, realizing that you too have a Master in heaven."

In Christian moral theology, justice is a quality or habit which perfects the will and inclines it to render to each and to all what belongs to them. The object of the virtue of justice is the other person's rights, whether natural or bestowed by church or state. Justice requires that all persons should be left in the free enjoyment of all their rights. The rights which belong to every human being are absolute and inalienable.

In Aristotle's wake, Thomas Aquinas developed a theory of proportional reciprocity, whereby the just man renders to each and all that is due to them in due proportion: what it is their moral and legal rights to do, possess, or exact. Justice toward God is called the "virtue of religion".

== Modern developments ==
With the late modern rise in interest in virtue ethics, a new interest in articulating the virtue of justice has emerged. John Rawls saw justice as the typical virtue of the institution; Irene van Staveren saw it as that of the state, marked by such indicators as votes, legitimacy, public fairness, and distributive rules.

== Psychology ==
Moral justice has been linked to the sixth and highest of Kohlberg's stages of moral development.

Freudians consider that in the unconscious the image of the Father embodies a stern but fair justice; Jungians similarly see the archetype of the King as representing the right ordering of society.

== In literature ==
Dante made Justice the virtue of his sixth heaven (the sphere of Jupiter), and illustrated it through such martial figures as Joshua and Roland.

Sir Philip Sydney wrote of "justice the chief of virtues"; Edmund Spenser devoted the fifth book of The Faerie Queene to the same theme.

Wallace Stevens rejected what he called "galled Justicia/Trained to poise the tables of the law" as part of the obsolete images of the past, and favoured instead the modernist seeking out new ruling images – new "sovereigns of the soul".

== See also ==
- Aristides – Athenian general and statesman (530–468 BC)
- De Legibus – Philosophical legal dialogue by Cicero
- Fortitude – Ability to deal with fear
- Lady Justice – Personification of justice
- Plato – Ancient Greek philosopher (c. 428-347 BC)
- Prudence – Ability of a person to regulate itself with the use of reason
- Temperance – Cardinal virtue of control over excess
